= More Than Life At Stake =

- Also known as: Stakes Larger Than Life
- Written by: Andrzej Zbych (Andrzej Szypulski and Zbigniew Safjan)
- Directed by: Andrzej Konic, Janusz Morgenstern
- Starring: Stanisław Mikulski; Emil Karewicz; Bronisław Pawlik; Mieczysław Stoor
- Music by: Jerzy Matuszkiewicz
- Country of origin: Poland
- Original language: Polish
- No. of episodes: 18

Production
- Cinematography: Antoni Wójtowicz
- Running time: 45-90 minutes

Original release
- Network: Polish Television
- Release: 1967 – 1968

More Than Life at Stake (Polish: Stawka większa niż życie), also known as Stakes Larger Than Life and Playing for High Stakes, is a Polish black and white TV series about the adventures of a Polish secret agent in Soviet service, captain Hans Kloss (real name Stanisław Kolicki, codename J-23), who acts as a double agent in the Abwehr during Second World War in occupied Poland.

Its precursor was a continuing television play of the same name, broadcast live in 1965 by Telewizja Polska. 14 installments were made (aired as part of the anthology series Teatr Telewizji), with the two main characters, the protagonist, Abwehr Hauptmann Hans Kloss, and his key antagonist, SS-Obersturmführer Hermann Brunner, portrayed respectively by actors Stanisław Mikulski and Emil Karewicz. The popularity of the play led to the creation of the TV series; Mikulski and Karewicz returned to portray Kloss and Brunner.

The series was filmed from March 1967 to October 1968. There were 18 episodes, 9 of which were directed by Janusz Morgenstern and the other 9 by Andrzej Konic. The show was very popular in Poland, the USSR, Yugoslavia, and Czechoslovakia. Re-runs are regularly broadcast on Polish TV.

Both the character of Hans Kloss, and that of Max von Stierlitz, the protagonist of the similarly themed Russian TV series Seventeen Moments of Spring, were allegedly inspired by the real-life exploits of Nikolai Kuznetsov, who successfully infiltrated Nazi armed forces under the guise of a German officer.

== Cast ==
- Stanisław Mikulski (lieutenant, later, captain Hans Kloss/J-23) - main role
- Emil Karewicz (Hermann Brunner, supporting role)
- Bronisław Pawlik (Kloss's contact)
- Mieczysław Stoor (Sturmführer Stedtke)
- Seweryn Butrym (general Wiehringer)
- Janina Borońska (radio operator Irena)
- Krzysztof Chamiec (Sturmbannführer Lothar)
- Alicja Zommer (doctor Marta Becher)
- Lucyna Winnicka (Ingrid Heizer, owner of "Cafe Ingrid")
- Tadeusz Bartosik (Lobler, owner "Excelsior")
- Andrzej Konic (Georg, contact in Gdańsk)
- Mieczysław Kalenik (Hans Diederlich, teacher)
- Igor Śmiałowski (engineer Reil)
- Leon Niemczyk (Rioletto)
- Lech Ordon (Puschke)
- Marian Opania (Kazik Truchanowicz)
- Tadeusz Kalinowski (Kreisleiter)
- Tadeusz Schmidt (major Horst)
- Krystyna Feldman (Reil's secretary)
- Alina Janowska (Rose Arens, owner of "Cafe Rose")
- Janusz Bylczyński (councilor Witte)
- Edmund Fetting (Christopulis)
- Leon Pietraszkiewicz (owner of inn "Orient")
- Mieczysław Voit (prince Mdżawanadze)
- Iga Cembrzyńska (Benita von Henning)
- Ignacy Gogolewski (captain Ruppert)
- Ewa Wiśniewska (Anna)
- Mariusz Dmochowski (Gruppenführer Fischer)
- Piotr Pawłowski (Adam Schmidt)
- Jolanta Zykun (Agnieszka)
- Władysław Hańcza (count Edwin Wąsowski)
- Gustaw Lutkiewicz (Sturmbannführer Lohse)
- Ignacy Machowski (Standartenführer Diblius)
- Wiesława Mazurkiewicz (major Hanna Bösel)
- Henryk Bąk (councilor Gebhard)
- Adam Pawlikowski (captain Boldt)
- Feliks Żukowski (colonel Kornel)
- Czesław Wołłejko (Sturmbannführer Geibel)
- Janusz Kłosiński (Józef Filipiak "Filip")
- Bogusław Sochnacki (Zając)
- Zdzisław Mrożewski (colonel Kraft)
- Maciej Damięcki (2 roles: Wacek Słowikowski, Eryk Słowikowski aka Eryk Getting)
- Józef Nalberczak (Wojtek)
- Joanna Jędryka (Basia Borzemska)
- Jan Englert (Tadek)
- August Kowalczyk (Sturmbannführer Dehne)
- Bolesław Płotnicki (Józef Podlasiński)
- Władysław Kowalski (Adam Pruchnal)
- Stanisław Niwiński (lt. Neumann)
- Jerzy Trela (Romek)
- Józef Nowak (partisan commander)
- Jerzy Nowak (tailor Skowronek)
- Lidia Korsakówna (Jeanne Mole)
- Eliasz Kuziemski (major Elert)
- Leszek Herdegen (2 roles: lt. von Vormann, English colonel)
- Leonard Pietraszak (Hubert Ornel)
- Edward Linde-Lubaszenko (Wehrmacht officer)
- Zdzisław Kuźniar (Wehrmacht officer)
- Igor Przegrodzki (doctor)
- Beata Tyszkiewicz (Christin Kield)
- Ryszard Filipski (Sturmbannführer Schabe)
- Jerzy Block (Oskar)
- Anna Seniuk (łączniczka)
- Witold Pyrkosz (Obersturmbannführer Kleist)
- Zygmunt Malanowicz (Johann Streit)
- Zdzisław Maklakiewicz (Untersturmführer Abusch)
- Ryszard Kotys (agent Z-82)
- Henryk Hunko (lt. Schlosser)
- Aleksandra Zawieruszanka (Edyta Lausch)
- Józef Kostecki (captain Schneider)
- Stanisław Zaczyk (major Broch)
- Andrzej Herder (Klossa aide)
- Józef Łodyński (Wasiak)
- Halina Kossobudzka (Inga Glass)
- Jerzy Kaliszewski (professor Glass)
- Janusz Paluszkiewicz (Tomala)
- Stanisław Jasiukiewicz (general Pfister)
- Andrzej Krasicki (Sturmbannführer Knoch)
- Teresa Kamińska (Simone)
- Barbara Burska (Janka)
- Eugeniusz Priwieziencew (Polish paratrooper)
- Barbara Brylska (Inga)
- Barbara Horawianka (Anna-Maria Elken)
- Barbara Rachwalska (Berta)
- Tobias Yves Zintel (2 roles: Austrian autistic, Nazi autistic)
- Stanisław Milski (Miller)
- Zygmunt Zintel (Schenk)
- Aleksander Fogiel (Polish colonel)
- Janusz Zakrzeński (Wernitz)
- Zygmunt Kęstowicz (Ohlers)
- Józef Duriasz (Lüboff)
- Saturnin Żórawski (Fahrenwirst)
- Wieńczysław Gliński (general Harris)
- Tadeusz Pluciński (captain Roberts)
- Zbigniew Zapasiewicz (captain Karpinski)
- Ryszard Pietruski (lt. Lewis)
- Włodzimierz Skoczylas (Vogel)
- Barbara Sołtysik (radiooperator Marta)
- Wiktor Grotowicz (general William)
- Ferdynand Matysik (colonel Litzke)
- Zbigniew Józefowicz (Soviet general)

== List of episodes ==
1. I Know Who You Are (Wiem, kim jesteś) dir. Janusz Morgenstern
2. Hotel Excelsior (Hotel Excelsior) dir. Andrzej Konic
3. Top Secret (Ściśle tajne) dir. Janusz Morgenstern
4. Café Rose (Café Rose) dir. Andrzej Konic
5. Last Chance (Ostatnia szansa) dir. Andrzej Konic
6. Iron Cross (Żelazny Krzyż) dir. Janusz Morgenstern
7. Double Nelson (Podwójny nelson) dir. Janusz Morgenstern
8. The Great Give-Away (Wielka wsypa) dir. Janusz Morgenstern
9. Colonel Kraft's ingenious plan (Genialny plan pułkownika Krafta) dir. Janusz Morgenstern
10. In the Name of the Republic (W imieniu Rzeczypospolitej) dir. Janusz Morgenstern
11. Password (Hasło) dir. Andrzej Konic
12. Treason (Zdrada) dir. Andrzej Konic
13. Without Instructions (Bez instrukcji) dir. Janusz Morgenstern
14. Edyta dir. Andrzej Konic
15. Siege (Oblężenie) dir. Andrzej Konic
16. Operation: "Oak Leaf" (Akcja - "Liść dębu") dir. Janusz Morgenstern
17. Meeting (Spotkanie) dir. Andrzej Konic
18. Wanted Gruppenführer Wolf (Poszukiwany Gruppenführer Wolf) dir. Andrzej Konic

== In other media ==
Several episodes of the series were adapted as short stories and collected in printed volumes. The show was also adapted as a comic book series, which gained high popularity and was translated into several languages. 20 volumes of the comic book were released, some of which were direct adaptations of the TV series, while others contained original storylines. The final volume of the comic book series expanded the show's story further, by having Kloss track down Nazi fugitives in Switzerland, shortly after the war.

== See also ==
- Czterej pancerni i pies
- Hans Kloss (video game)
