= Birth Certificate (film) =

1961 Polish war film

- Polish: Świadectwo urodzenia
- Directed by: Stanisław Różewicz
- Written by: Tadeusz Różewicz; Stanisław Różewicz
- Produced by: Film Group Rytm
- Starring: Henryk Hryniewicz; Edward Mincer; Beata Barszczewska
- Cinematography: Stanisław Loth
- Edited by: Czesław Raniszewski; Anna Rubińska
- Music by: Lucjan Kaszycki
- Release date: October 2, 1962 (Poland)
- Running time: 99 minutes
- Country: Poland
- Languages: Polish; German

Birth Certificate (Polish: Świadectwo urodzenia) is a Polish war film from 1961 directed by Stanisław Różewicz, based on a screenplay co-written with the director's brother, Tadeusz Różewicz. The film consists of three separate novellas, each narrated from the perspective of children affected by the events of World War II.

The film was critically acclaimed, winning prestigious awards at youth-oriented film festivals in Cannes and Venice. The third novella, depicting the struggle of an orphaned Jewish girl to survive, garnered particular interest from critics and researchers. However, the novella's ending – and that of the entire film – sparked controversy. Birth Certificate, with its director distancing himself from debates on Polish wartime heroism, is considered part of the plebeian trend within the Polish Film School movement.

== Plot ==
Birth Certificate is divided into three novellas. The first, Na drodze (On the Road), takes place in September 1939, during the chaos of war. A soldier, separated from his unit and transporting staff documents, is joined by a young boy, Janek, who is searching for his mother. They encounter a German tank column; the soldier, surrounded, grabs a rifle from his cart and begins shooting, while Janek flees for his life.

The second novella, List z obozu (Letter from the Camp), follows the wartime lives of three brothers – Zbyszek, Heniek, and Jacek. Their father is a prisoner of war, and their mother smuggles goods to sustain them. One day, a Soviet soldier escapes from a nearby camp and finds refuge in the boys' home. With their help, he continues his escape, but soon after, the neighboring camp is liquidated.

The third novella, Kropla krwi (A Drop of Blood), begins with young Mirka awakening in an abandoned Jewish tenement after its residents have been deported by the Nazis. She seeks help from a doctor who once knew her father but finds no refuge. Wandering, she ends up in a provincial orphanage, where she is raised as a Catholic. However, a Nazi commission arrives at the orphanage, selecting children for the Lebensborn program. Paradoxically deemed Aryan, Mirka is taken to Germany and adopted by a German family.

== Cast ==
=== Na drodze ===
- Henryk Hryniewicz – Janek
- Wojciech Siemion – the quartermaster Józef
- Barbara Rachwalska – woman from the forester's lodge
- Mieczysław Stoor – German motorcyclist
- Janusz Kłosiński – shopkeeper
- Barbara Wałkówna – young mother outside a rural cottage
- Krystyna Feldman – peasant woman from a pacified village
- Józef Teryks – peasant from a pacified village

=== List z obozu ===
- Edward Mincer – Zbyszek
- Andrzej Banaszewski – Heniek
- Paweł Różewicz – Jacek
- Stanisław Milski – neighbor Ciziak
- Józef Nalberczak – prisoner
- Tadeusz Schmidt – gendarme
- Janusz Ziejewski – German gendarme escorting the prisoner
- Maria Kaniewska – neighbor lending kerosene
- Jadwiga Kuryluk – Ludka
- Józef Zbiróg – banschutz
- Zbigniew Skowroński – man on the street

=== Kropla krwi ===
- Beata Barszczewska – Mirka
- Zofia Małynicz – headmistress of the orphanage
- Zdzisław Mrożewski – Doctor Orzechowski
- Małgorzata Leśniewska – nurse
- Mariusz Dmochowski – Gestapo officer
- Emil Karewicz – German doctor
- Zygmunt Zintel – interpreter
- Wanda Łuczycka – Mrs. Cieślik
- Maria Ciesielska – teacher Urszula
- Halina Gryglaszewska – doctor's wife
- Janusz Paluszkiewicz
- Adam Kwiatkowski – passenger on the train
- Marysia Hrobaczewska
- Wanda Jakubińska – elderly woman
- Leonard Andrzejewski – reveler
- Włodzimierz Kwaskowski – drunk man with a mustache
- Bohdana Majda – female reveler
- Halina Billing – neighbor of the Zieliński family

== Production ==
Birth Certificate was produced by the Film Group Rytm, under the artistic direction of Jan Rybkowski and the literary supervision of Aleksander Ścibor-Rylski. The inspiration for the film's director, Stanisław Różewicz, and his brother, poet Tadeusz Różewicz, came from real-life events. The ideas for the first two novellas (Na drodze, List z obozu) were based on the personal wartime experiences of the two brothers. The third novella, Kropla krwi, was inspired by the true story of a Jewish girl, described in the collection Dzieci oskarżają, compiled by Maria Hochberg-Mariańska and Noe Grüss.

The brothers brought the script to Rytm in the spring of 1960, and on June 3 of the same year, a meeting of the Script Evaluation Commission took place, chaired by Tadeusz Karpowski. The script sparked lively discussion; its artistic value was generally appreciated, but many members of the commission were opposed to starting work on the project. Jerzy Toeplitz criticized the authors for the novella structure, suggesting it might alienate viewers. Henryk Hubert was concerned that the film might overwhelm audiences with its child-centered themes. However, the opinions of the remaining commission members (including Tadeusz Konwicki, Jerzy Pomianowski, Krzysztof Teodor Toeplitz (brother of Jerzy), and Ścibor-Rylski) prevailed, as they considered the critics' objections unconvincing. Ultimately, Rybkowski emphasized the potential ideological value of List z obozu and convinced the commission to proceed with the project. The script was then sent for short consultations and later to production.

A significant contribution to the film's artistic quality came from the cinematographer Stanisław Loth and the set designer Tadeusz Wybult. The music for Birth Certificate was composed by Lucjan Kaszycki, while the film was edited by Czesław Raniszewski and Anna Rubińska. The film was shot in Łódź, Spała, Piotrków Trybunalski (at the train station and with a city panorama), and by the Pilica river. The premiere of Birth Certificate took place on 2 October 1961, and the film was seen by 550,000 viewers in Polish cinemas, with 21,600 attending in Warsaw.

== Reception ==
Konrad Eberhardt, in his review for Film, described Birth Certificate as "a doubly optimistic event", calling the film both "outstanding" and a manifestation of the director's formal and intellectual maturity. Bronisława Stolarska wrote that Birth Certificate "concentrates the best qualities of Różewicz's art – governed by the principle of artistic economy – achieving the most with the simplest means". According to Marek Hendrykowski, "no one before Różewicz managed to tell several wartime stories in such a synthetic and incredibly concise form, emanating with similar expression and having such a dramatic potential for the viewer". Marek Haltof noted that "Różewicz is not a moralist. Instead of criticizing the Nazi system, he exposes its madness". Tadeusz Lubelski concluded that "at the time, this film, more than any other in the director's career, was showered with awards and aroused admiration from popular experience, distant from the interests of the Polish Film School".

The third novella of Birth Certificate was particularly praised, although its final scene, in which the SS officer and Mirka gaze at each other, was at times misinterpreted as humorous at the time of the premiere. For example, Zygmunt Kałużyński wrote that "the film turns into a satire, to which the narrative approach had not prepared us, and, moreover, this is the conclusion of the whole film, which through this final mockery... loses its dramatic tension". However, Ernest Bryll interpreted the ending differently, stating that Kropla krwi clearly emphasizes "a gradation of fear. Different, nonetheless, as the filmmakers remind us, for 'Aryan' and 'non-Aryan' children". Bryll found the film's conclusion "valuable", summarizing that "what is even more significant, aspiring to the level of a great metaphor, is the child's plea to be recognized as Polish". Tadeusz Sobolewski, writing for Gazeta Wyborcza, regarded the third novella as "the most magnificent", also placing particular emphasis on the film's ending:

In this silent confrontation of two faces, the entire ethical problem of Różewicz's cinema is concentrated, the suspended question in his films about the origin of good and evil, about the possibility of transcending oneself. The face of the other is the only transcendence available to humans, wrote philosopher Emmanuel Levinas. The face of another is always exposed, we always owe it something. But for the same reasons, it also arouses aggression. Everything begins with the face.

The film was received more skeptically abroad. James Breen of Sight & Sound noted that Birth Certificate was composed "from beginning to end with raw pieces of tragedy and pathos – each of them shocking, but not all of them appropriately selected and shaped". However, in 2015, the British Film Institute placed Birth Certificate in the second (audience-voted) list of the best films about childhood during wartime.

In 2011, in a list of the 50 best Polish films compiled by the portal Esensja, Birth Certificate was ranked 16th, with the portal's editor Urszula Lipińska justifying the film's position by its avoidance of "the typical sentimentality that arises when telling tragic events from a child's perspective".

=== Analyses and interpretations ===
==== Formal analyses ====
Birth Certificate is considered one of the representative works of the so-called plebeian trend in the Polish Film School. According to Tadeusz Lubelski, its essence lay in "the authors' focus on the daily lives of ordinary people, emphasizing the natural motivation behind their actions". Piotr Zwierzchowski added that Różewicz's films, including Birth Certificate, "convince us that there is nothing heroic about war; war is not beautiful".

Monika Maszewska-Łupiniak, in her cinematic monograph on Różewicz's work, emphasized the role of minimalist space in Birth Certificate. In the first novella, the audience is presented with landscapes that offer no sense of security against "hostile external forces":

Empty roads, deserted towns, burned and abandoned houses, bars in empty windows, decaying military equipment in forest undergrowth, forests, endless fields, and vast expanses of chaotic September wanderings.

The film's space becomes particularly dangerous in the third novella, where Mirka is constantly forced to hide: "knocking on the door can mean death, and any person encountered could be an enemy. There is no safe space, no secure world". Maszewska-Łupiniak also highlighted the use of horizontal composition and distant shots in open landscapes. In her view, this enhances the "sense of alienation and aimlessness" in the characters' wanderings, thereby distancing viewers from the events portrayed on screen.

==== Issue of message and historical truth ====
Rafał Marszałek, analyzing Kropla krwi, emphasized the constant danger Mirka faced, reliant on the help of Poles who were fearful and not always altruistic:

We see how Mirka's potential guardians pass her from hand to hand. These are friendly hands, but they are unwilling or unable to provide lasting support. The story unfolds on the fine line between solidarity and heroism. Solidarity arises spontaneously, but heroism is within the reach of only a few. The help offered to the girl is not always motivated by compassion.

Critics such as Aránzazu Calderón Puerta and Tomasz Żukowski cautiously debated Marszałek's and other similar assessments. According to them, Birth Certificate presents a mostly "symmetrical" narrative of Polish kindness toward Jewish fugitives. While Kropla krwi portrays the dilemmas tormenting a Jewish child – "Mirka is still partly a child but has already internalized the stigma, a product of the overlap between Polish antisemitic traditions and the mechanisms of Nazi extermination" – the film ultimately conveys a strongly anti-German message:

Mirka, paradoxically – somewhat contrary to earlier depictions – is portrayed solely as a victim of Nazism. The ending connects her unrelenting fear exclusively to the black uniform of the SS officer.

Jarosław Suchoples attributed the portrayal of wartime events in Różewicz's work to the rising political tensions at the end of the Polish October:

The political situation in the country prevented Różewicz and other Polish filmmakers from engaging in projects depicting the early weeks of the war that lacked purely artistic value.

Joanna Preizner observed that, although Poles are idealized as "noble individuals striving to maintain dignity and honor", Różewicz underscores their ordinariness and unpreparedness for the circumstances. In Mirka's plight in the third novella, Poles appear helpless, causing her to lose trust in all people:

The girl loses everything – her entire family, home, identity, and family history. She must pretend to be someone else, deny her heritage, hide her pain, and suppress her mourning for her parents to survive. Everyone – not just Germans – becomes a threat to her, and she loses all possible points of support.

=== Awards ===
Year	Festival/Organizer	Award	Recipient
1961	International Film Festival for Children and Youth, Venice	St. Mark's Lion	Stanisław Różewicz
1962	Ministry of Culture and National Heritage	First Degree Award	Stanisław Różewicz, Stanisław Loth
1962	International Youth Film Festival, Cannes	Grand Prix	Stanisław Różewicz
1962	International Youth Film Festival, Cannes	FIPRESCI Award	Stanisław Różewicz

== Bibliography ==
- Lubelski, T. (2015). Historia kina polskiego 1895–2014 [History of Polish Cinema 1895–2014] (in Polish). Kraków: Universitas.
- Maszewska-Łupiniak, M. (2009). Rzeczywistość filmowa Stanisława Różewicza [The Cinematic Reality of Stanisław Różewicz] (in Polish). Kraków: Wydawnictwo Uniwersytetu Jagiellońskiego.
- Puerta, A. C.; Żukowski, T. (2014). "Narracja narodowo-kombatancka versus wątek żydowski w kinie polskim lat sześćdziesiątych" [The National-Combatant Narrative Versus the Jewish Thread in Polish Cinema of the 1960s]. Komunizm. Idee, Dyskursy, Praktyki (in Polish): 221–254.
- Preizner, J. (2012). Kamienie na macewie. Holokaust w polskim kinie [Stones on the Matzevah. The Holocaust in Polish Cinema] (in Polish). Kraków: Austeria. ISBN 978-83-61978-92-3.
