= Na odsiecz Wiedniowi =

1983 film

- Directed by: Lucyna Smolińska; Mieczysław Sroka
- Starring: Jerzy Bińczycki
- Release date: 1983
- Countries: Poland; Austria
- Language: Polish

Na odsiecz Wiedniowi is a Polish historical film about the Battle of Vienna. It was released in 1983.

== Cast ==
- Jerzy Bińczycki as John III Sobieski
- Anna Dymna as Marie Casimire d'Arquien
- Jerzy Kamas as Jan Gniński
- Emil Karewicz as Stanisław Jan Jabłonowski
- Gustaw Lutkiewicz as Marek Matczyński
- Józef Para as Opisto Pallavicini
- Franciszek Pieczka as Ibrahim Pasha
- Karol Strasburger as Charles V, Duke of Lorraine
- Jerzy Trela as Kara Mustafa Pasha
- Leonard Andrzejewski as Murad Giray
