= The Doll (1977 TV series) =

1977 TV series

- Written by: Aleksander Ścibor-Rylski; Jadwiga Wojtyłło
- Directed by: Ryszard Ber
- Starring: Małgorzata Braunek; Jerzy Kamas; Bronisław Pawlik
- Composer: Andrzej Kurylewicz

Production
- Cinematography: Jacek Korcelli
- Editor: Alina Faflik

The Doll is a 1977 nine-episode limited-run TV series produced by Polish Television upon the novel by Bolesław Prus. The series was written by Aleksander Ścibor-Rylski and Jadwiga Wojtyłło, and directed by Ryszard Ber.

== Production ==
Filming began on 21 April 1976. Locations included Warsaw, Wrocław, Janowiec, Nieborów, Czerwińsk, Piotrków Trybunalski, Łódź and Zaborów.

== Cast ==
Source.

- Małgorzata Braunek as Izabela Łęcka
- Jerzy Kamas as Stanisław Wokulski
- Bronisław Pawlik as Ignacy Rzecki
- Zofia Jaroszewska as Mrs Zasławska
- Maria Kaniewska as Mrs Meliton
- Emil Karewicz as Tomasz Łęcki, father of Izabela
- Piotr Fronczewski as Henryk Szlangbaum
- Czesław Wołłejko as Krzeszowski
- Alina Janowska as Krzeszowska
- Anna Milewska as Florentyna
- Barbara Wrzesińska as Kazimiera Wąsowska
- Roman Wilhelmi as Kazimierz Starski
- Andrzej Zaorski as Julian Ochocki
- Marta Lipińska as Helena Stawska
- Krzysztof Litwin as Zięba, a shop assistant in Wokulski’s store
