= Stanisław Milski =

Polish actor

Milski, Stanisław
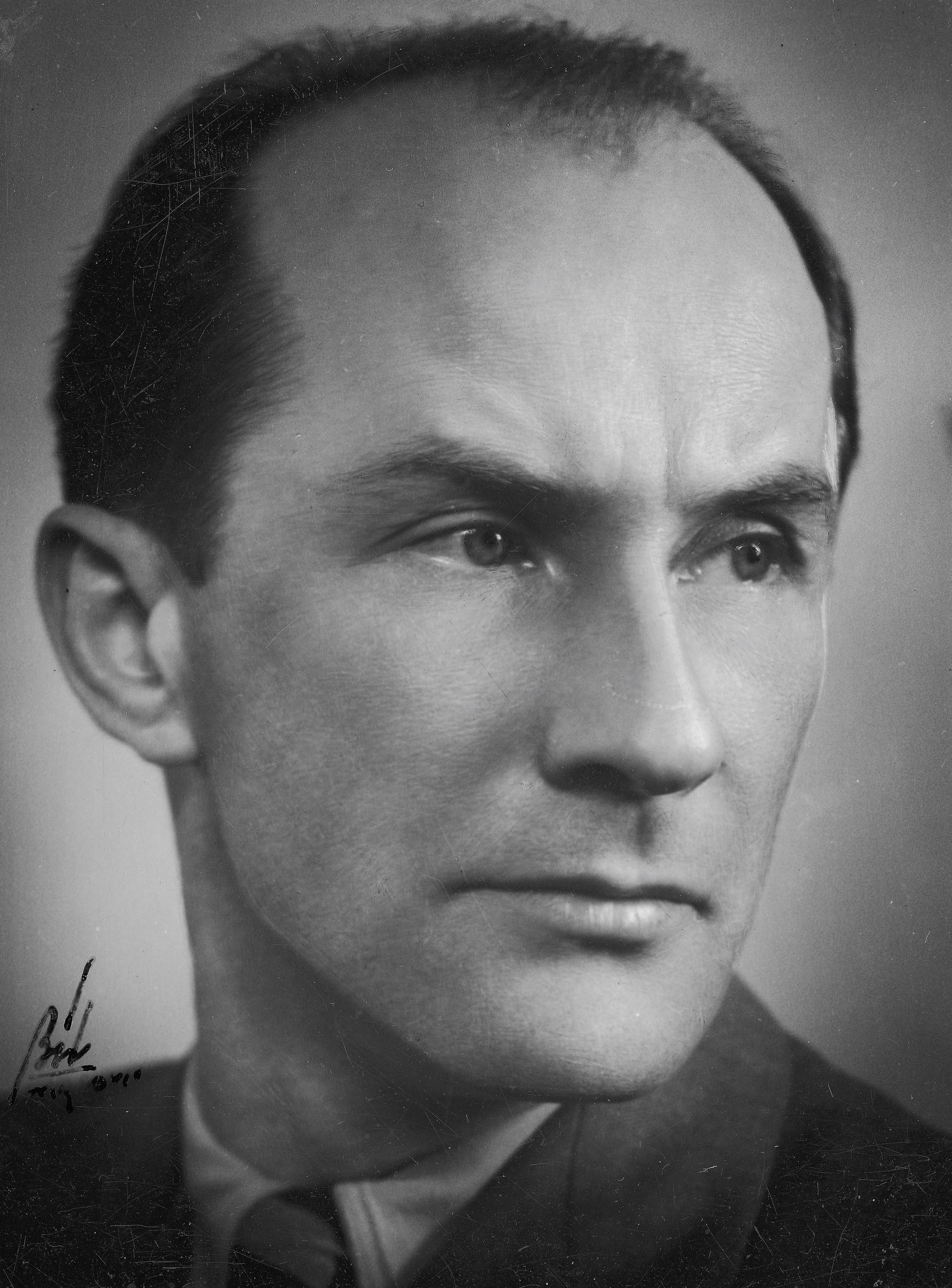
- Born: 8 February 1897; Czchów, Galicia, Austria-Hungary
- Died: 4 September 1972 (aged 75); Warsaw, Poland
- Occupation: Actor

Stanisław Jan Milski (8 February 1897, Czchów – 4 September 1972, Warsaw) was a Polish actor, director, and artist manager.

== Life ==
He was the son of two peasants: Jan Hołyst and Katarzyna Hołyst, nee Rychter. He graduated from ballet school in Poznań, but his injury after the accident prevented him from practicing as a dancer. Then he became interested in decoration and theatrical costume design.

From 1916, he performed on the stages of theaters in Vilnius, Katowice, Poznań, Lviv, Kraków, Łódź, and Toruń. In the 1930s, he also dabbled in directing. From 1937, he collaborated with the Warsaw office of Polskie Radio as a media presenter and narrator.

From 1939 to 1941, he performed on the stage of the Polish Theatre in Vilnius. At that time, he also started dating fellow actor Władysław Surzyński, with whom he stayed together for 30 years. During World War II, he also worked as a coachman in the Vilnius region.

In the 1944/45 season, he directed at the Polish Dramatic Theatre in Vilnius. In 1945, he moved with the entire Vilnius theater company to Toruń, where he was an actor and director at the Pomeranian Region Theatre.

In the 1945/1946 season, he performed at the Stefan Jaracz Theatre in Olsztyn, also serving as its artistic director. In the 1946/1947 season, he acted and directed at the Aleksander Węgierko Theatre in Białystok, in 1948 at the Classical Theatre (now Teatr Studio) in Warsaw, and again at the Stefan Jaracz Theatre in Olsztyn from 1948 to 1952.

In the 1955-56 season, he directed at the Lubuski Theatre in Zielona Góra, and from 1955 to 1964 also at the Wybrzeże Theatre in Gdańsk. From 1964, he directed at the Juliusz Osterwa Theatre in Lublin. In 1966, he celebrated the fiftieth anniversary of his artistic career and retired.

Towards the end of his life, he retired from performing on stage, but became a popular film actor. Playing primarily in supporting roles, his talent allowed him to create truly exceptional performances, which is why he was often called the "master of the cameo."

He was buried in the Radość cemetery in Warsaw.

== Partial filmography ==
- Gromada (1952) - Secretary Jaglik
- Celuloza (1954) - Szczesny's FatherForeman Czerwiaczek
- Poscig (1954)
- Pod gwiazda frygijska (1954) - Szczesny's Father
- A Generation (1955) - Krone
- Godziny nadziei (1955) - SS Colonel Nagel
- Podhale w ogniu (1955) - Radocki
- Sprawa pilota Maresza (1956) - Zdybel
- Tajemnica dzikiego szybu (1956) - Headmaster Zajaczkowski
- Nikodem Dyzma (1956) - Owsik
- Ziemia (1957) - Grzelak
- Pozegnanie z diablem (1957) - Psychiatrist
- Noose (1958) - Rybicki
- Eva Wants to Sleep (1958) - Fafula
- The Eighth Day of the Week (1958) - Stefan Walicki (voice, uncredited)
- Co rekne zena? (1958) - Pietrzykowski
- Ashes and Diamonds (1958) - Pieniazek
- Farewells (1958) - Professor
- Pigulki dla Aurelii (1958) - Jarema
- Krzyz Walecznych (1959) - chlop Bartlomiej Kowal
- The Depot of the Dead (1959) - Garage Manager
- Orzel (1959) - Höze, Deputy Commandant at Tallinn Harbour
- Male dramaty (1959) - Grandfather
- Sygnaly (1959) - Drunk Driver
- Bialy niedzwiedz (1959) - Professor
- Miasteczko (1960) - Zygmunt Sobczak
- Knights of the Teutonic Order (1960) - Priest Medicine
- Kolorowe ponczochy (1960)
- Satan from the Seventh Grade (1960) - Professor Karol Gasowski
- Historia wspólczesna (1961) - Mailman
- Ostroznie, Yeti! (1961) - Guard at the Airport
- Tonight a City Will Die (1961) - Vittorio
- Swiadectwo urodzenia (1961) - Neighbour Ciziak (segment "List z obozu")
- Komedianty (1962)
- The Two Who Stole the Moon (1962) - Shoemaker in Zapiecek
- Wielka, wieksza i najwieksza (1963) - Captain (voice)
- Zerwany most (1963) - Polski chlop
- Mansarda (1963) - Hrabia Swietokrzyski
- Kryptonim Nektar (1963)
- Gdzie jest general... (1964) - General Ernst von Falkenberg
- Echo (1964) - Fisherman
- Przerwany lot (1964) - Guest at the Wedding
- Panienka z okienka (1964) - Mikolaj Strus
- Pharaoh (1966) - Mephres - High Priest
- Pieczone golabki (1966) - Tenant
- Bicz bozy (1967) - Antoni
- Hrabina Cosel (1968) - Count Furstenberg
- Kierunek Berlin (1969) - Stanislaw Fronczak
- Samotnosc we dwoje (1969) - Zajac
- Gra (1969)
- Czerwone i zlote (1969) - Zapieralski
- Paragon, gola! (1970)
- How I Unleashed World War II (1970) - German General
- Lokis (1970)
- Pierscien ksieznej Anny (1971) - Krzyzak
- Epilog norymberski (1971)
- I Hate Mondays (1971) - Musician (uncredited)
- Zwyciestwo (1975) - Stanislaw Fronczak (final film role)
