= Jerzy Kamas =

Polish actor (1938–2015)

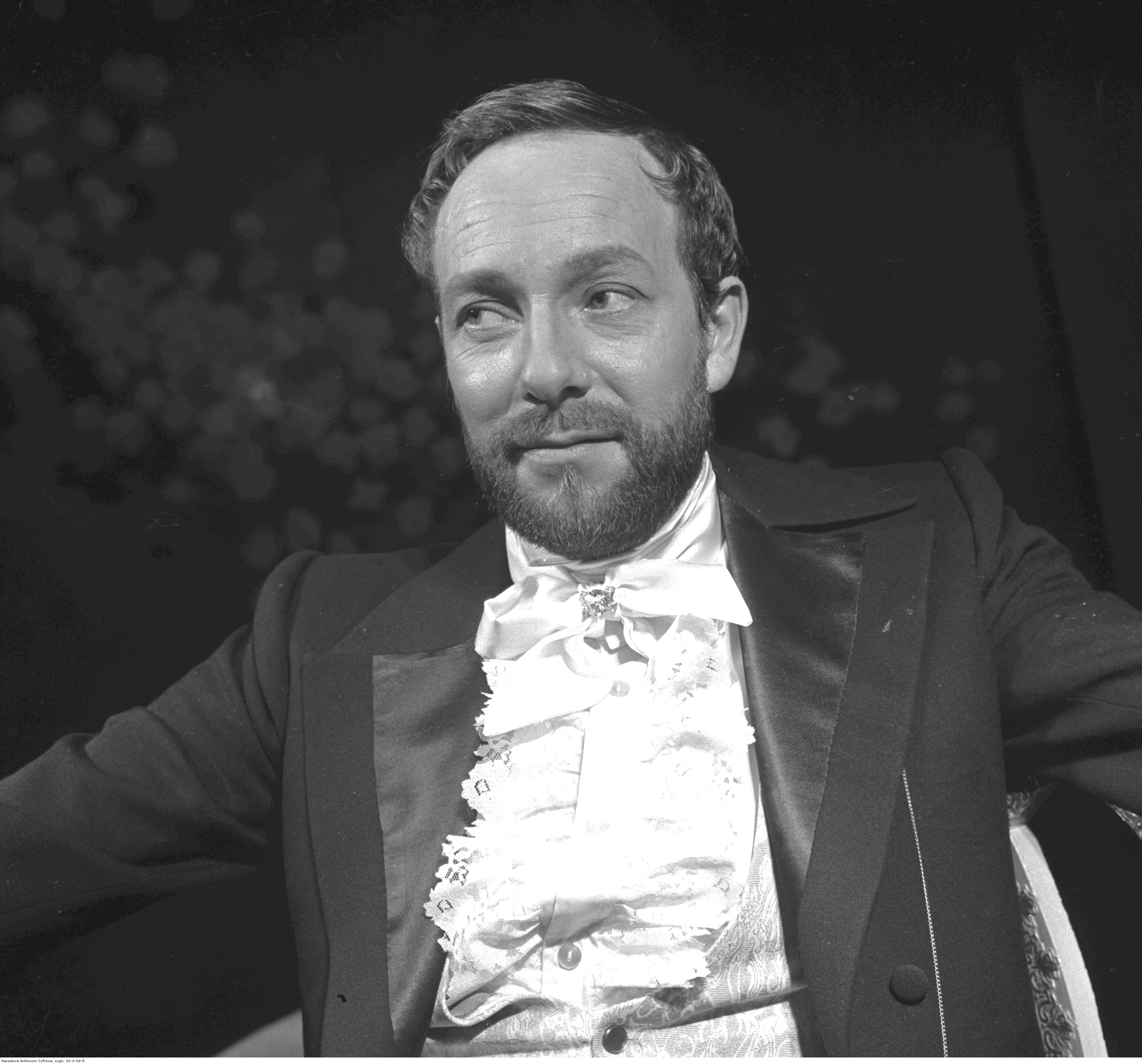
- Jerzy Kamas, 1973
- Born: 8 July 1938; Łódź
- Died: 23 August 2015 (aged 77); Warszawa
- Citizenship: Polish
- Occupation: Actor

Jerzy Kamas

Jerzy Kamas (8 July 1938 – 23 August 2015) was an actor.

== Biography ==
In 1961 he graduated in acting from the Łódź Film School. His remainings were buried at the Powązki Cemetery.

== Filmography ==
Source.

- Knights of the Teutonic Order (1960) as bollard in Szczytno; not credited
- Nights and Days (1975) as Daniel Ostrzeński
- The Doll (1977; TV series) as Stanisław Wokulski
- Sekret Enigmy (1979)
- Playing with the Devil (1979; TV play)
- The Issa Valley (1982) as Romuald Bukowski, the Surkonts' neighbor
- Na odsiecz Wiedniowi (1983) as Jan Gniński
- No End (1985) as Judge Biedroń
- Republika nadziei (1988) as Stefan Rowiński
- The Last Mission (2000) as Stefan Dębowski
- Little Rose (2010) as President of the PEN Club

== Accolades ==
- Gold Cross of Merit (1978)
- Medal of the 40th Anniversary of People's Poland (1985)
- Knight's Cross of the Order of Polonia Restituta (1988)
- Officer's Cross of the Order of Polonia Restituta (2003)
- Gold Gloria Artis Medal for Merit to Culture (2011)
