= Satan from the Seventh Grade =

Book by Kornel Makuszyński

- Author: Kornel Makuszyński
- Original title: Szatan z siódmej klasy
- Translator: Paweł Szczerkowski (English) Yolande Bernard (French) Peter Čačko (Slovak)
- Publication date: 1937

Satan from the Seventh Grade, also known as The Twelfth Grade Devil, (Polish: Szatan z siódmej klasy) is a 1937 children's and young adult book by Polish writer Kornel Makuszyński. It is considered a classic in Poland, where it remains in print.

The book has been translated into Hebrew, French, Slovak, and English.

The "Seventh Grade" of the title is according to the Polish educational system at the time of writing, where students underwent four years of Elementary education followed by eight years of Further or High School. The book's protagonist is in the 7th grade of the latter, (11th grade in North American English-language usage) and is thus about 17 years old.

== Synopsis ==
Adam Cisowski, a precocious and "devilishly clever" high school pupil (the "satan" of the title) spends a summer holiday at a run-down country house, presided over by "The Professor" - an aristocratic, eccentric historian who is friendly and affable but completely improvident.

Suddenly, treasure hunting is launched by the discovery that an officer of Napoleon's Grand Army, who was taken care of by the Professor's ancestors in the aftermath of the disastrous 1812 invasion of Russia, may have left to his benefactors a hidden treasure (which would be very great help for their impoverished present-day descendants).

However, the subtle trail of hints left by the French officer defy all minds but that of the "devilish" Adam. Adam energetically takes up the challenge, seeking to help his hosts - and in particular, win the heart of Wanda, the Professor's beautiful niece.

Throughout the book, he follows the perplexing trail, clue after clue, using hints from such sources as Dante's Inferno. Adam must, moreover, play a dangerous game of cat-and-mouse with a nasty gang of criminals, who also got the scent and who are very determined to lay their own hands on the treasure.

At a certain moment the search looks like having gotten to a dead end - a vital hint had been written on the door of an outbuilding, but the door is not there any more. It turns out, however, that the door in question was used as an improvised stretcher on which a wounded rebel was carried to a neighbouring village during the Polish 1863 uprising against Russian rule - and that after this use, the door had been installed at the village church, where Adam duly finds it and writes down the clue.

Finally, Adam finds the treasure - not before providing the criminals which he knows to be following him with a red herring and letting them "rob" from him a heavy old cask full of worthless scrap iron. They open the cask with much trouble, suspect each other of cheating, get into a violent quarrel, and get arrested by the police.

The true treasure, meanwhile found hidden in a stork's nest, is more lightweight - a small sack full of jewellery which the French officer presumably looted in Russia, and whose worth is more than enough to provide for the Professor and his family. In the book's final sentence, Adam looks from the glittering jewels to Wanda's eyes, and finds them "more precious than all treasures in the world".

== Adaptations ==
A 1960 film adaptation was directed by Maria Kaniewska, and starred Józef Skwark.

A 2006 film adaptation was directed by Kazimierz Tarnas, and starred Bartosz Fajge.

== See also ==
- Polish literature
