= Kostrzewski =

Kostrzewski (feminine Kostrzewska) is a Polish surname. Notable people with the surname include:

- Barbara Kostrzewska (1915–1986), Polish singer and theatre director
- Franciszek Kostrzewski (1826–1911), Polish painter
- Józef Kostrzewski (1885–1969), Polish archeologist
- Mateusz Kostrzewski (born 1989), Polish professional basketball player
- Roman Kostrzewski (1960–2022), Polish heavy metal musician
- Stefan Kostrzewski (1902–1999), Polish sprinter
