= List of voivodes of Chernihiv =

This is the list of voivodes of Chernihiv. A Chernihiv voivode was a Muscovite military position in Cossack Hetmanate.

- Prince Feodor Mezetskiy (1534–1537)
- Prince Mikhail Troyekurov-Akhmet (1553–1557)
- Ivan Ochin-Plescheyev (1556–1557)
- Matvei "Dyak" Rzhevskiy (1559–1563), siege voivode
- Prince Vasiliy Prozorovskiy (1563–1566)
  - Foma Tretiakov (1563)
- Feodor Nagoi (1566–1567)
- Prince Osip Scherbatov (1576–1578)
- Prince Ivan "Shiban" Dolgorukov (1543, 1578–1584)
- Afanasiy Zagryazhskiy (1582)
- Prince Ivan Turenin-Obolenskiy (1586–1589)
- Semeon Saburov-Papin (1595)
- Prince Feodor Nogotkov-Obolenskiy (1596)
- Prince Vasiliy Musa Turenin (1596–1598)
- Prince Fyodor Sheremetev (1598)
- Andrei Izmailov (1598)
- Prince Mikhail Kashin-Obolenksiy (1603–1604)
  - Prince Gavriil Korkodinov
  - Prince Grigoriy Shakhovskoy
- Prince Boris Tatev (1604)
- Prince Ivan Tatev (1604)
- Prince Semeon Zvenigorodskiy (1605), second voivode
- Prince Andrei "Khripun" Teliatevskiy (1606)
- Andrei Dashkov (1658)
- Ivan Zagryazhskiy (1660–1662), siege voivode
- Prince Ignat Volkonskiy (1662–1665), siege voivode
- Ivan Pushkin (1682–1684)
- Prince Fedul Volkonskiy (1686–1689, possibly)
- Prince Feodor Shakhovskoy (1687)
- Semeon Neplyuyev (1689)
- Bogdan Polibin (1689–1696)
- Prince Feodor "Orleonok" Volkonskiy (1696–1698)
- Marcin Kalinowski (1635–1652)
- Krzysztof Tyszkiewicz (1658–1660)
- Stanisław Kazimierz Bieniewski (1660–1676)
- Jan Gniński (1678–1680)
- Mariusz Stanisław Jaskólski (1680–1683)
- Otto Friedrich von Fölkersahm (1685–1695)
- Franciszek Jan Załuski (1695–1717)
- Mikołaj Franciszek Krosnowski (1717–1723)
- Piotr Jan Potocki (1724–1726)
- Józef Lubomirski (1726–1732)
- Józef Potulicki (1732–1734)
- Jakub Florian Narzymski (1734–1737)
- Piotr Michał Miączyński (1737–1776)
- Franciszek Antoni Ledóchowski (1776–1783)
- Ludwik Wilga (1783–1795)
