= Satan from the Seventh Grade (film) =

Szatan from the 7th Grade
- Directed by: Maria Kaniewska
- Written by: Maria Kaniewska
- Starring: Pola Raksa; Stanisław Milski; Józef Skwark
- Music by: Witold Krzemieński
- Release date: 25 November 1960
- Running time: 105 minutes
- Country: Poland
- Language: Polish

Szatan from the Seventh Grade (Polish: Szatan z siódmej klasy) is a 1960 Polish romance film directed by Maria Kaniewska. Based on the 1937 novel Satan from the Seventh Grade (The English edition of the book from 2024 is called The Twelfth Grade Devil) by Kornel Makuszyński, it is considered a classic children's film in Poland.

== Cast ==
- Pola Raksa as Wanda
- Józef Skwark as Adam Cisowski
- Stanisław Milski as Professor Paweł Gąsowski
- Krystyna Karkowska as Gąsowska
- Kazimierz Wichniarz as Gąsowski
- Mieczysław Czechowicz as Painter
- Janusz Kłosiński as Żegota
- Aleksander Fogiel as Priest
- Krzysztof Krawczyk as Boy
- Leonard Pietraszak as Boy
