= Pola Raksa =

Polish movie star, singer, and model (born 1941)

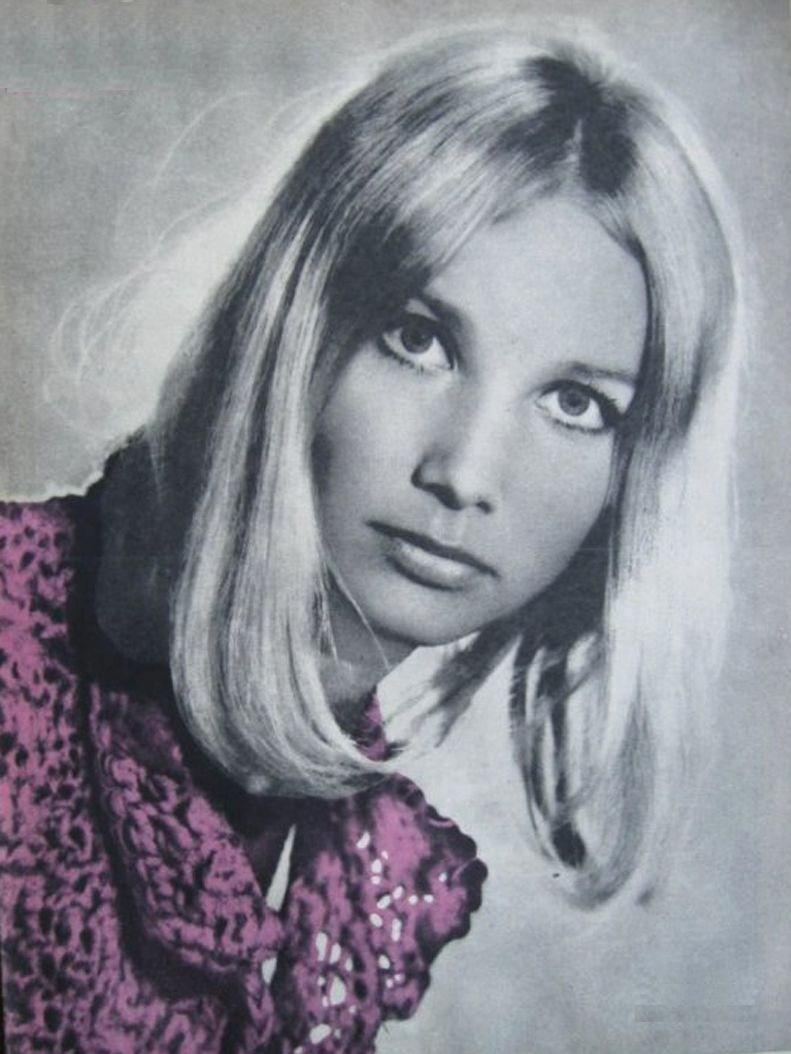
- Born: Apolonia Raksa; 14 April 1941 (age 85); Lida, Byelorussian Soviet Socialist Republic, USSR
- Occupation: Actress
- Years active: 1960–1999
- Spouse: Andrzej Kostenko (div.)

Apolonia "Pola" Raksa (born 14 April 1941) is a Polish movie star, singer, and model who was especially popular in Poland and abroad in the 1960s and 1970s.

Born to Edward Raksa, Pola was born in Lida. Her parents left German Nazi-occupied territory in 1943 and after the World War II settled in Wrocław (western Lesnica neighborhood).

Her career started in the 1950s, when she was spotted by a reporter of the Dookoła Świata magazine in a bar mleczny (Polish cafeteria). He took some shots of her and Raksa appeared in the magazine as Girl of the Week. Soon afterwards, she was offered her first cameos in movies. After graduating from the Liceum ogólnokształcące No.1 in Wrocław, she studied in the Wroclaw University, Department of Philologie (Polish Language). Raksa participated in the student theater Kalambur. Later she changed her major and moved to Łódź, to the National Film School in Łódź. She graduated in 1964 and in the same year debuted on stage. Between 1964 and 1968, she played in Teatr Powszechny in Łódź, then moved to Warsaw, to play in Teatr Wspolczesny (at Śródmieście, Warsaw). In 2003 readers of the Super Express daily chose her the best of all Polish blonde actresses. Raksa was awarded several prizes. She has a son, Marcin Kostenko, with her first husband, Andrzej Kostenko.

== Selected filmography ==
- Szatan z siódmej klasy (Satan from the Seventh Grade), as Wanda (debut, 1960) along with Maria Kaniewska
- Panienka z okienka (Lady in a window), as Hedwiga (1964)
- Rekopis znaleziony w Saragossie (The Saragossa Manuscript), Inezilia, Camila's sister (1964)
- Popioły, as Helena de With, Olbromski's love (1965)
- Bicz boży, as Hania, Pawel's crush (1966)
- Czterej pancerni i pies as the nurse Marusia nicknamed Ogoniok (in one of the episodes she sings a song in Russian Four tank-men, one bride on YouTube),
- Przygoda z piosenka (Adventure with a song), as Mariola Bronska (1968).
- Uprowadzenie Agaty (Agata's Abduction), as Agata's mother (1993, latest)

== Awards ==
- Prize of the journal Soviet Screen, at the International movie festival in Moscow 1967
- 1967 best actress by the readers the Soviet Screen journal
- Distinguished Culture Personality of Poland (1979)
- Laureate of the prize of the II Television Festivals of Drama Theater for her role in Romeo and Juliette play (1965)
- Laureate of the Silver Mask prize (1967, 1969, 1970)
- Golden Cross of Merit (1974)
- Laureate of the journal Soviet Screen prize at the Moscow International Film Festival (1967, for her role in Zosia)
