= Sekret Enigmy =

1979 film by Roman Wionczek

- Directed by: Roman Wionczek
- Written by: Stanislaw Strumph-Wojtkiewicz; Roman Wionczek
- Starring: Tadeusz Borowski; Piotr Fronczewski; Piotr Garlicki
- Cinematography: Jacek Zygadło
- Edited by: Malgorzata Domalik; Zbigniew Nawrocki; Jadwiga Zajicek
- Music by: Henryk Kuźniak; Jerzy Maksymiuk
- Production company: Zespoły Filmowe
- Release date: 1979
- Country: Poland
- Language: Polish

Sekret Enigmy (The Secret of Enigma) is a Polish historical film directed by Roman Wionczek. It was released in 1979.

The film is based on Stanisław Strumph-Wojtkiewicz's book Sekret Enigmy.

== Cast ==
- Tadeusz Borowski as Marian Rejewski
- Piotr Fronczewski as Jerzy Różycki
- Piotr Garlicki as Henryk Zygalski
- Tadeusz Pluciński
- Jerzy Kamas
- Janusz Zakrzeński
- Emil Karewicz
- Andrzej Szczepkowski
- Stanisław Mikulski
- Stanisław Zaczyk
- Jolanta Wołłejko
- Ewa Żukowska
- Tadeusz Szaniecki
