= Krzysztof Litwin =

Actor and painter (1935–2000)

Krzysztof Litwin (19 June 1935 – 8 November 2000) was an actor, graphic artist and painter.

== Biography ==
He performed at the Piwnica pod Baranami. He collaborated with Silna Grupa pod Wezwaniem. He studied at the Academy of Fine Arts in Kraków, graduating from the Faculty of Graphic Arts. He died of tumor.

== Filmography ==
Source.

- One Room Tenants (Wspólny pokój, 1959)
- Złoto (1961)
- The Saragossa Manuscript (1964) as Don Lopez Soarez
- Przygody psa Cywila (1968, television series) as sergeant Walczak
- The Doll (1968) as Klein, a shop assistant in Wokulski's store
- The Doll (1977, television series) as Zięba, a shop assistant in Wokulski's store
