= Operacja Himmler =

1979 film by Zbigniew Chmielewski

- Directed by: Zbigniew Chmielewski
- Written by: Eugeniusz Kozłowski, Włodzimierz T. Kowalski
- Cinematography: Jan Janczewski
- Edited by: Jolanta Filar, Józef Bartczak
- Music by: Piotr Marczewski
- Release date: 1979
- Country: Poland
- Language: Polish

Operacja Himmler (Polish: Operation Himmler) is a Polish historical film directed by Zbigniew Chmielewski. It was released in 1979. It tells about the Gleiwitz incident. It was written by Eugeniusz Kozłowski and Włodzimierz T. Kowalski.

== Cast ==
- Stanisław Frąckowiak – Alfred Naujocks
- Wirgiliusz Gryń – Sturmbannführer Hoffmann
- Eugeniusz Kujawski – Reinhard Heydrich
- Ryszard Pietruski – Adolf Hitler
- Janusz Sykutera – Heinrich Müller
- Tomasz Zaliwski – Wacław Stachiewicz
- Antoni Jurasz – Rolf
- Leszek Świgoń – teacher in SS school
- Jerzy Moes – Gestapo officer
- Paweł Unrug – officer of SS
- Andrzej Gazdeczka – Rudi
- Ryszard Kotys – prisoner
- Adam Baumann – uncredited
- Aleksander Mikołajczak – uncredited
- Olgierd Łukaszewicz – Schollenberg
- Czesław Stopka – uncredited
