= Stanisław Mikulski =

Polish actor

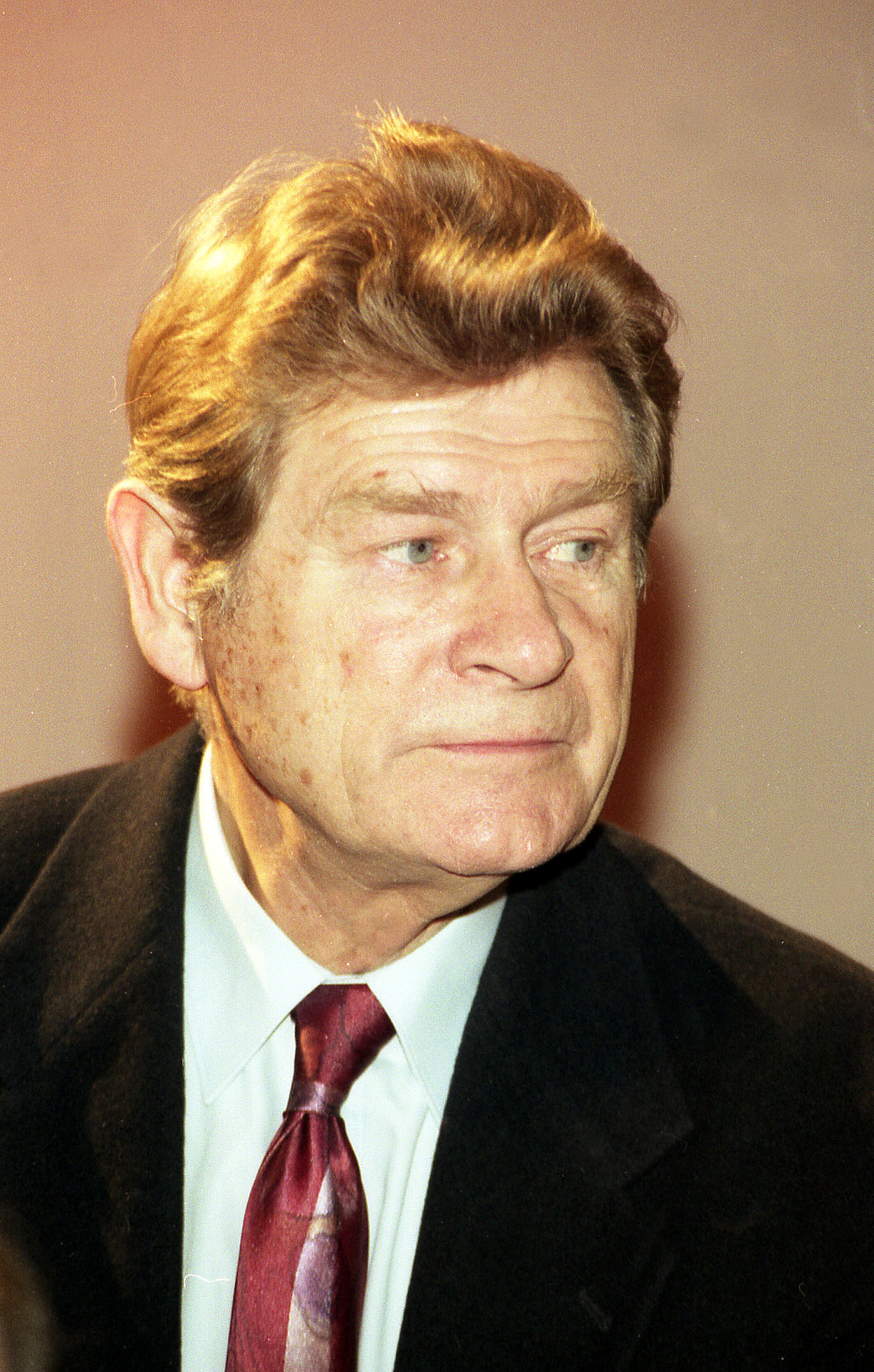
- Born: 1 May 1929; Łódź, Poland
- Died: 27 November 2014 (aged 85); Warsaw, Poland
- Burial place: Powązki Cemetery
- Occupation: Actor

Stanisław Mikulski (1 May 1929 – 27 November 2014) was a Polish theatre, television and film actor, and host of Koło Fortuny (the Polish version of Wheel of Fortune).

Mikulski gained fame for his leading role in the 1967–68 television series Stawka większa niż życie. As a result of being typecast as Hans Kloss, he moved his focus toward theatre work. In 1983 he was a member of the jury at the 13th Moscow International Film Festival.

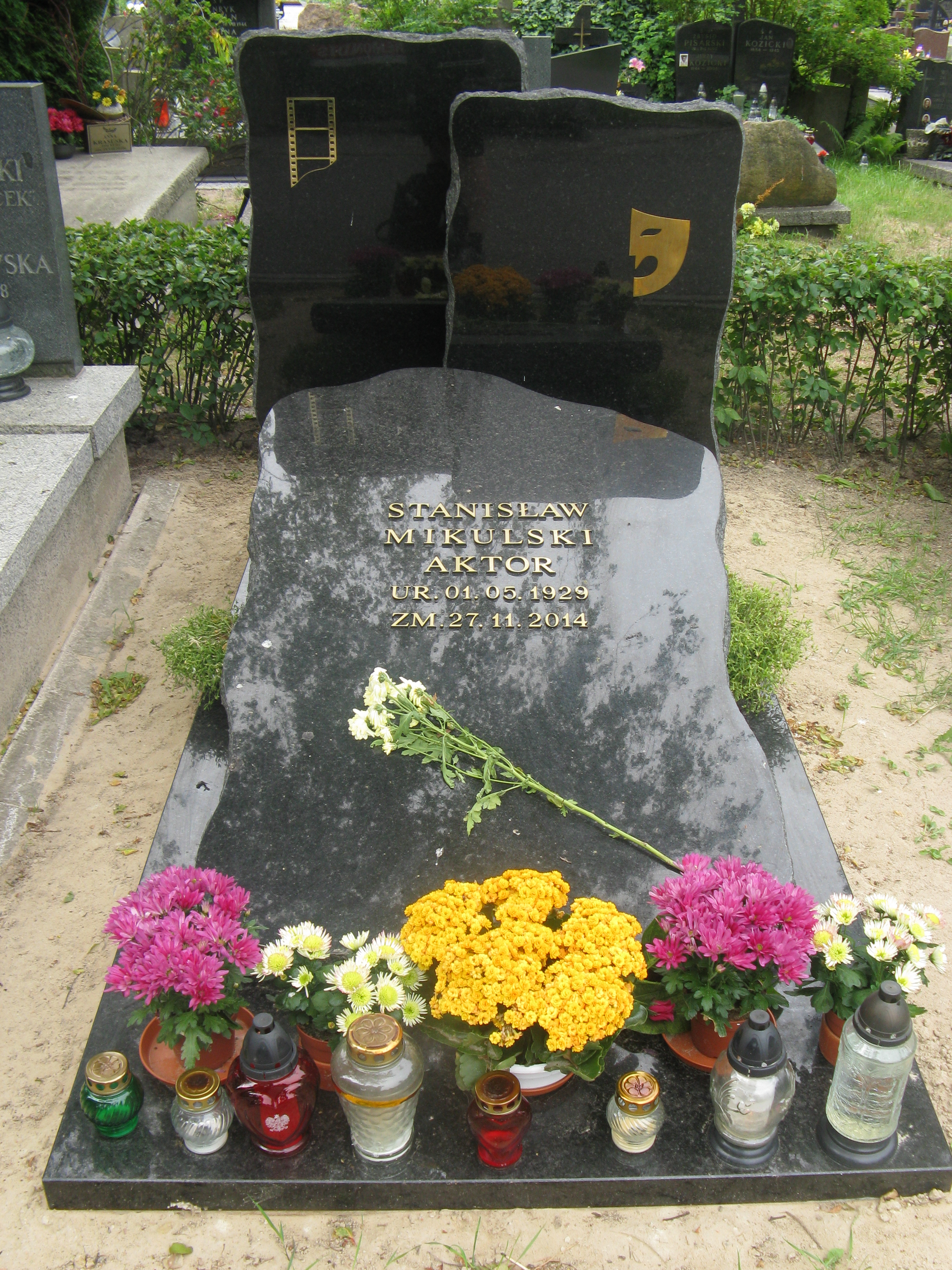
Grób aktora na Cmentarzu Wojskowym na Powązkach w Warszawie

== Selected filmography ==
- Godziny nadziei (1955)
- Kanał (1957)
- Ewa chce spać (1957)
- Dwaj panowie N (1961)
- Ostatni kurs (1963)
- Skąpani w ogniu (1963)
- Powrót na ziemię (1966)
- Stawka większa niż życie (1967-1968)
- Ostatni świadek (1969)
- Samochodzik i templariusze (1971)
- Zaczarowane podwórko (1974)
- Sekret Enigmy (1979)
- Miś (1980)
- Katastrofa w Gibraltarze (1984)
