= Gdzie woda czysta i trawa zielona =

1977 film directed by Bohdan Poręba

- Directed by: Bohdan Poręba
- Written by: Ryszard Gontarz
- Cinematography: Kazimierz Madejski
- Edited by: Lidia Pacewicz
- Music by: Piotr Figiel
- Release date: 1977
- Country: Poland
- Language: Polish

Gdzie woda czysta i trawa zielona is a 1977 film directed by Bohdan Poręba, written by Ryszard Gontarz.

== Production ==
The film was produced by Zespół Filmowy Profil and was shot in Sandomierz.

== Cast ==
- Tadeusz Borowski as secretary Jan Kuriata
- Alicja Jachiewicz as Elżbieta, wife of Jan
- Maria Klejdysz as Domańska
- Małgorzata Rogacka-Wiśniewska as Szymańska
- Maria Cichocka as Kaniowa
- Anna Jaraczówna as an elderly lady

Source.

== Awards ==
The film received the Audience Award at the Polish Film Festival in Gdańsk in 1977.

== Bibliography ==
- Skwara, Janusz (1977). "Gdzie woda czysta i trawa zielona". Film. 18: 7.
- Lubelski, Tadeusz (2008). "Kino partyjnej kontrofensywy". Historia kina polskiego. Twórcy, filmy, konteksty. Katowice: Videograf II. pp. 414–415.
