= Roman Mann =

- Born: October 19, 1911; Lemberg, Austro-Hungarian Empire
- Died: March 11, 1960 (aged 48); Zakopane, Poland
- Occupation: Art director
- Years active: 1947-1960

Roman Mann (19 October 1911 — 11 March 1960) was a Polish art director, who worked on more than thirty films including Dead Track (1948). His brother was the artist Kazimierz Mann.

== Personal Life and Death ==
Mann died in Zakopane in 1960. He was married to Lidwina (née Müller), a film costume designer, and had two sons, Marek (1942) (painter, graphic artist, illustrator) and Paul (1945) (archaeologist and filmmaker).

== Selected filmography ==
- The Last Stage (1948)
- Warsaw Premiere (1951)

== Bibliography ==
- Haltof, Marek. Polish Film and the Holocaust: Politics and Memory. Berghahn Books, 2012.
