= Antonina Girycz =

Polish actress (1939–2022)

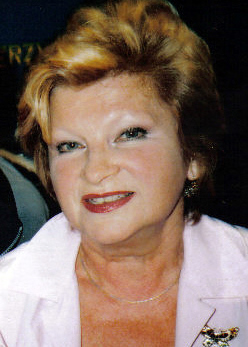
- Girycz in 2007
- Born: 20 February 1939; Berdyczów, Poland
- Died: 19 January 2022 (aged 82)
- Occupation: Actress
- Years active: 1966–2013

Antonina Girycz (20 February 1939 – 19 January 2022) was a Polish actress. She appeared in more than 50 films and television shows since 1966. Girycz died on 19 January 2022, at the age of 82.

== Selected filmography ==
- Katastrofa (1965)
- A Woman's Decision (1975)
