= Stanisław Loth =

Polish cinematographer and film director (born 1929)

- Born: 21 January 1929 (age 97); Pabianice
- Citizenship: Polish
- Occupations: Cinematographer, film director

Stanisław Jerzy Loth (born 21 January 1929) is a Polish cinematographer and film director.

== Biography ==
In 1954 he graduated in cinematography from the Łódź Film School. In 1981 he emigrated to the United States. He consulted on the 3D cinematography for Jaws 3-D (1983), after which he moved to medical filmmaking. He holds four patents for modern film techniques.

== Filmography ==
=== As cinematographer ===
- Marysia i krasnoludki (1960)
- Birth Certificate (1961)
- Dziewczyna z dobrego domu (1962)
- Nad rzeką (1962)
- Agnieszka 46 (1964)
- Wyspa złoczyńców (1965)
- Pearl in the Crown (1972)
- Nights and Days (1975)
- Trędowata (1976 film) (1976)

=== As director ===
- Dziewczyna i chłopak (1977, TV series)
- Nasze podwórko (1980, TV series)
- Dziewczyna i chłopak (1980)

== Bibliography ==
- Lubomir Mackiewicz, Anna Żołna, ed. (1993). Kto jest kim w Polsce. Informator biograficzny. Warszawa. pp. 400–401.
- Boleslaw Wierzbianski, ed. (1996). "Stanislaw Jerzy Loth". Who's Who in Polish America (1st 1996–1997 ed.). New York: Bicentennial Publishing Corporation. Archived from the original on 27 August 2025.
