= Bohdan Poręba =

Film director (1934–2014)

- Born: 5 April 1934; Vilnius
- Died: 25 January 2014 (aged 79); Warsaw
- Occupation: Film director

Bohdan Poręba (5 April 1934 – 25 January 2014) was a film and theatre director and screenwriter.

== Biography ==
His father was a soldier of Polish Legions and member of the Home Army, and his mother was a teacher. Bohdan Poręba until 1945 lived with his family in Vilnius. Later, he attended Ludwik Waryński High School in Bydgoszcz, where he led a drama club. In 1955 graduated in film direction from the Łódź Film School.

He headed Profil Film Unit from 1975 to 1981 and from 1982 to 1998. He was a member of the Polish United Workers' Party (from 1969) and Patriotic Movement for National Rebirth; as well as first president of the Zjednoczenie Patriotyczne “Grunwald”. From 1987 to 1989 he was a member of the Cinematography Committee.

He directed more than twenty theatre plays. From 1986 to 1989 he was an artistic director of the Dramatic Theatre in Gdynia.

In 2005 parliamentary election he ran for Sejm from the committee of Samoobrona, as a member of National Party. He was married twice. With his second wife, Ewa Jastrzębowska, they had a son Maciej. He lived at Targowa Street at Praga. He was buried at the Northern Communal Cemetery in Warsaw.

== Filmography ==
- Wyspa wielkiej nadziei (1957; documentary film)
- Lunatycy (1959)
- Droga na Zachód (1961)
- Daleka jest droga (1963)
- Nad odrą (1965)
- Gniewko, syn rybaka (1969; TV series)
- Prawdzie w oczy (1970)
- Hubal (1973)
- Jarosław Dąbrowski (1975)
- Gdzie woda czysta i trawa zielona (1977)
- Polonia Restituta (1980)
- Katastrofa w Gibraltarze (1983)
- Złoty pociąg (1986)
- Penelopy (1988)
- Siwa legenda (1991)

Source.

== Awards ==
- Syrenka Warszawska for Wyspa wielkiej nadziei (1958)
- Commander's Cross of the Order of Polonia Restituta (1983)

== Bibliography ==
- Lubelski, Tadeusz (2008). "Kino partyjnej kontrofensywy". Historia kina polskiego. Twórcy, filmy, konteksty. Katowice: Videograf II. pp. 414–415.
