= Włodzimierz Tadeusz Kowalski =

Polish historian (1934–1990)

- Born: 17 April 1934; Łódź, Poland
- Died: 23 September 1990 (aged 56); Warsaw, Poland
- Citizenship: Polish
- Occupations: Historian, screenwriter

Włodzimierz Tadeusz Kowalski (17 April 1934 – 23 September 1990) was a Polish historian and screenwriter. He worked at the Tadeusz Manteuffel Institute of History of the Polish Academy of Sciences and specialized in the history of Polish diplomacy during World War II. In the years 1970–1980 he was a consultant (operational contact) of the Security Service under the pseudonym "Witek". He was a member of the Polish United Workers' Party.

== Works ==
- Bitwa nad Bzurą. Warsaw: Wydawnictwo Ministerstwa Obrony Narodowej. 1964.
- ZSRR a granica na Odrze i Nysie Łużyckiej 1941–1945. Warsaw: Wydawnictwo Ministerstwa Obrony Narodowej. 1965.
- Walka dyplomatyczna o miejsce Polski w Europie 1939–1945. Warsaw: Książka i Wiedza. 1966. Second edition published in 1967; further editions published in 1970 (third), in 1972 (fourth), in 1979 (fifth) and in 1985 (sixth).
- Obrona Modlina. Warsaw: Państwowe Zakłady Wydawnictw Szkolnych. 1967.
- ZSRR a zachodnie granice Polski. Warsaw: Rada Naczelna Towarzystwa Rozwoju Ziem Zachodnich – Polska Agencja Interpress – RSW „Prasa”. 1967.
- Ostatnia bitwa generała Kleeberga. Lublin: Wydawnictwo Lubelskie. 1969.
- ZSRR a sprawa granic i niepodległości Polski. Warsaw: Interpress. 1969.
- Jałta i Poczdam. Warsaw: Państwowe Zakłady Wydawnictw Szkolnych. 1970.
- Rola ZSRR w ustalaniu granicy na Odrze i Nysie Łużyckiej. Warsaw: Towarzystwo Przyjaźni Polsko-Radzieckiej. 1970.
- Polityka zagraniczna RP 1944–1947. Warsaw: Książka i Wiedza. 1971.
- Wielka koalicja 1941–1945. Vol. 1. Warsaw: Wydawnictwo Ministerstwa Obrony Narodowej. 1972. Further editions: 1973 (second), 1976 (third), 1978 (fourth).
- Poczdamski ład pokojowy. Warsaw: Wydawnictwo Ministerstwa Obrony Narodowej. 1974. Further editions: 1975 (second), 1986 (third).
- Wielka koalicja 1941–1945. Vol. 2. Warsaw: Wydawnictwo Ministerstwa Obrony Narodowej. 1975. Further editions: 1976 (second), 1978 (third), 1980 (fourth).
- Wielka Koalicja 1941–1945. Vol. 3. Warsaw: Wydawnictwo Ministerstwa Obrony Narodowej. 1977. Second edition: 1978.
- Przed burzą 1939. Warsaw: Książka i Wiedza. 1978. Co-authored with Ryszard Frelek.
- Rok 1918. Warsaw: Krajowa Agencja Wydawnicza. 1978. Second edition: 1989.
- Stosunki polsko-radzieckie 1917–1945. Warsaw: Krajowa Agencja Wydawnicza. 1980. Co-authored with Andrzej Skrzypek.
- Układ polsko-radziecki o przyjaźni, pomocy wzajemnej i współpracy powojennej. Lublin: Wydawnictwo Lubelskie. 1980. ISBN 8322200927.
- Tragedia w Gibraltarze. Warsaw: Krajowa Agencja Wydawnicza. 1982. Second edition: 1989.
- Zachód a Polska (XVIII–XX w.). Warsaw: Książka i Wiedza. 1984. ISBN 8305113264.
- Teheran, Jałta, Poczdam. Warsaw: Wydawnictwo Towarzystwa Przyjaźni Polsko-Radzieckiej „Współpraca”. 1985. ISBN 8370180167.
- Zakręt '44. Warsaw: Krajowa Agencja Wydawnicza. 1985. ISBN 8303008374.
- Polska w świecie 1945–1956. Warsaw: Książka i Wiedza. 1988. ISBN 8305119246.
- W kręgu mitów i rzeczywistości. Warsaw: Interpress. 1988. ISBN 8322324774. Co-authored with Jadwiga Sosnkowska.
- Ostatni rok Europy (1939). Warsaw: Wydawnictwo Ministerstwa Obrony Narodowej. 1989. ISBN 831107707X.

=== Editions ===
- Granica na Odrze i Nysie Łużyckiej: zbiór materiałów i dokumentów. Vol. 1–2. Warsaw: Polski Instytut Spraw Międzynarodowych. Zakład Problemów Bezpieczeństwa Europejskiego. 1971. Co-edited with Piotr Lippóczy.
- Polska w polityce międzynarodowej (1939–1945): zbiór dokumentów. Vol. 1. Warsaw: Państwowy Instytut Wydawniczy. 1989. ISBN 8306017773.

== Filmography (as screenwriter) ==
=== Films ===
- Operacja Himmler (1979), with Eugeniusz Kozłowski
- Polonia Restituta (1980)
- Katastrofa w Gibraltarze (1983)

=== Television shows ===
- Poczdam 1945 (1973), with Ryszard Frelek
- Sprawa polska 1944 (1975), with Ryszard Frelek
- Polska – czas burzy i przełomu 1939–1945 (1980), with Ryszard Frelek

== Accolades ==
- Knight's Cross of Polonia Restituta
- Gold Cross of Merit
- Silver Cross of Merit
