= Katastrofa w Gibraltarze =

- Directed by: Bohdan Poręba
- Written by: Włodzimierz T. Kowalski
- Cinematography: Wacław Dybowski
- Edited by: Anna Maria Czołnik
- Release date: 1984
- Running time: 164 minutes
- Country: Poland
- Language: Polish

Katastrofa w Gibraltarze is a 1983 Polish war film directed by Bohdan Poręba and written by Włodzimierz T. Kowalski. The plot is about the 1943 Gibraltar Liberator AL523 crash.

== Cast ==
- Jerzy Molga as Władysław Sikorski
- Arkadiusz Bazak as Władysław Anders
- Teresa Lipowska as Helena Sikorska
- Darinka Mitowa as Zofia Leśniowska
- Andrzej Krasicki as Franklin Delano Roosevelt
- Bogusław Sochnacki as Joseph Stalin
- Włodzimierz Wiszniewski as Winston Churchill
- Emil Karewicz as Kazimierz Sosnkowski
- Tomasz Zaliwski as Tadeusz Klimecki
- Józef Dietl as Władysław Raczkiewicz
- Stanisław Mikulski as Edward Raczyński
- Roman Sikora as Stanisław Kot
- Lech Sołuba as minister Tadeusz Romer
- Stanisław Sparażyński as ambassador of France in Poland
- Jerzy Aleksander Braszka as Józef Retinger
- Wojciech Brzozowicz as British officer in Gibraltar
- Jan Orsza-Łukaszewicz as old Polish general
- Tadeusz Hanusek as officer at the briefing after Sikorski's dismissal
- Jack Recknitz as Mason MacFarlane
- Bogusław Augustyn
- Zygmunt Wiaderny
