= Barbara Połomska =

Polish actress (1934–2021)

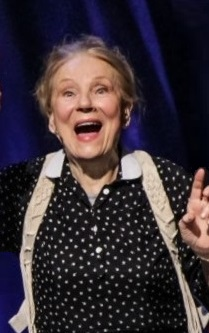
- Born: 9 January 1934; Bydgoszcz, Poland
- Died: 28 July 2021 (aged 87); Poland
- Occupation: Actress
- Years active: 1955–2018

Barbara Połomska (9 January 1934 – 28 July 2021) was a Polish actress. She appeared in more than twenty films since 1955.

== Selected filmography ==
Year	Title	Role	Notes
1956	Shadow		
1958	Eroica	Zosia	
1958	The Eighth Day of the Week	Ela	
1958	Hvězda jede na jih		
1960	Bad Luck		
