= Artur Młodnicki =

Polish actor and theatre director

- Born: 28 August 1911; Lemberg, Austria-Hungary
- Died: 16 July 1972 (aged 60); Wrocław, Poland
- Occupation: Actor
- Years active: 1947-1972

Artur Młodnicki (28 August 1911 – 16 July 1972) was a Polish actor and theatre director. He performed in the theater in Wrocław from 1952 to 1972 and appeared in more than twenty films from 1947 to 1972.

== Selected filmography ==
| Year | Title | Role |
|---|---|---|
| 1958 | Ashes and Diamonds | Kotowicz |
| 1963 | How to Be Loved | Tomasz |
