= Polonia Restituta (film) =

1981 Polish historical film directed by Bohdan Poręba

- Directed by: Bohdan Poręba
- Written by: Włodzimierz T. Kowalski
- Starring: Janusz Zakrzeński, Krzysztof Chamiec, Józef Fryźlewicz, Jerzy Kaliszewski, Emil Karewicz
- Cinematography: Wacław Dybowski
- Edited by: Jarosław Ostanówko
- Music by: Czesław Niemen
- Release date: 1981
- Country: Poland
- Language: Polish

Polonia Restituta (Latin for "Restored Poland") is a 1980 historical film based on a 1928 documentary of the same name. It was written by Włodzimierz T. Kowalski and directed by Bohdan Poręba.

The 1928 film is held in the National Film Archive of the Audiovisual Institute and in the National Digital Archive.

The 1981 film was directed by Bohdan Poręba. The film's production companies were Lenfilm, Magyar Filmgyártó Vallalat, Zespol Filmowy "Profil", Barrandov Studios, and DEFA.

== Synopsis ==
The 1981 film covers historical events that occurred from 1914 to 1919.

The 1928 film "presents events that contributed to regaining independence by Poland and to shaping its borders after the period of partitions. It was produced at the initiative of Józef Błeszyński in 1928, on the 10th anniversary of regaining independence. It was an important work in terms of propaganda as it showed the efforts of Poles fighting for the rebirth of their state."

Events in the 1928 film include details about the Polish army, the German occupation of Warsaw, the fight against Ukraine for Eastern Galicia, the liberation of Wilno, the Polish–Soviet War, the Treaty of Warsaw, the conquest of Kyiv, and the Peace of Riga.

== Cast ==
- Krzysztof Chamiec
- Józef Fryźlewicz
- Janusz Zakrzeński
- Jerzy Kaliszewski
- Emil Karewicz
- Edmund Fetting
