= Jacek Łągwa =

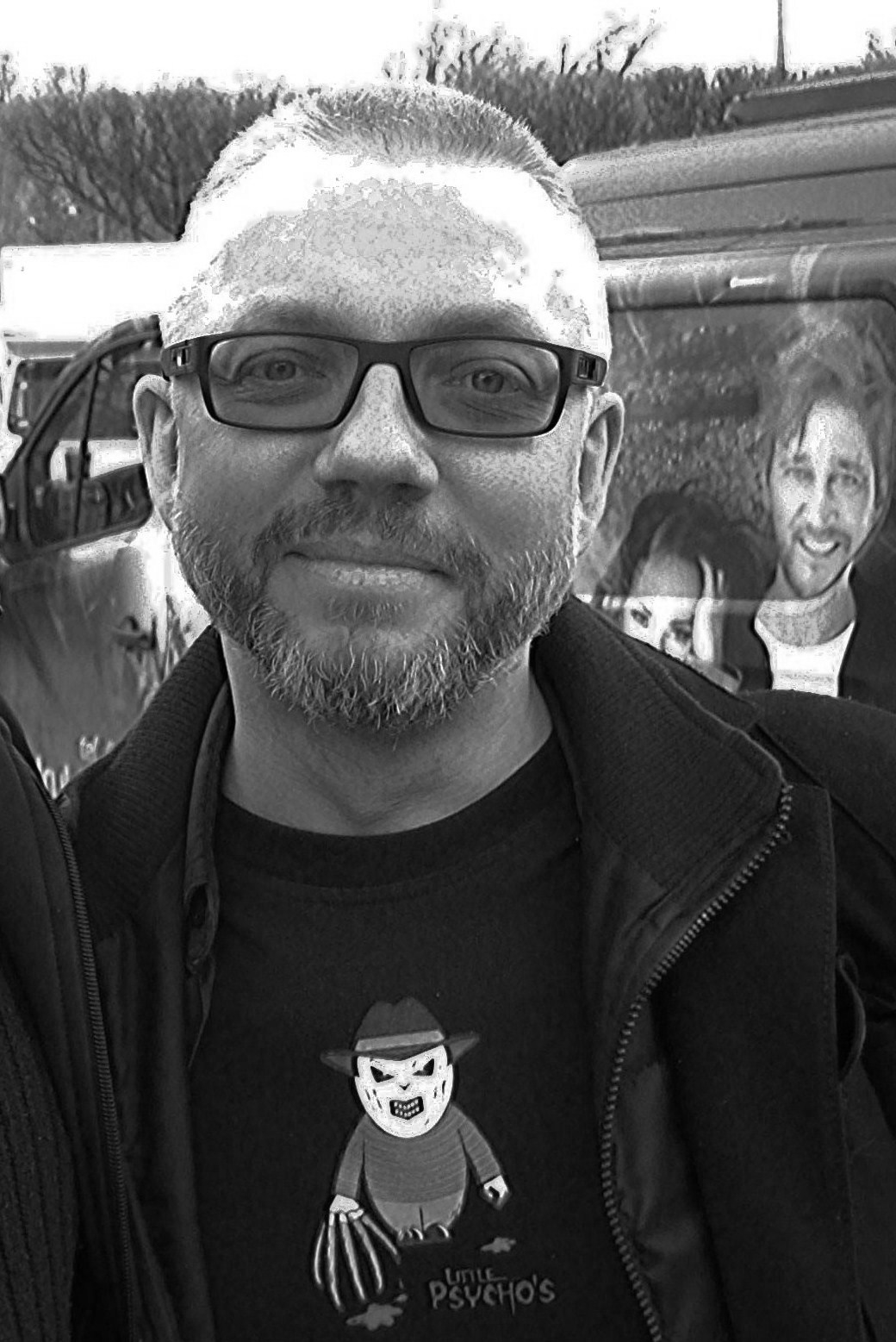
- Born: Jacek Andrzej Łągwa; 11 October 1969 (age 56); Łódź, Poland
- Occupations: Musician, singer
- Spouse: Dorota Łągwa (divorced)
- Children: 2 (daughters)
- Parent(s): Janina Borońska-Łągwa; Andrzej Łągwa
- Musical career
- Genres: Pop
- Instruments: Piano, guitar
- Label: Bauer Music

Jacek Andrzej Łągwa (born 11 October 1969 in Łódź, Poland) is a Polish musician, composer, actor and vocalist of the famous Polish band Ich Troje.

His parents are actors Janina Borońska and Andrzej Łągwa. As an actor he played a role of Zbigniew in 1978 movie Pogrzeb świerszcza. As a composer he created and performed soundtracks to such movies as Godzina (1991), Gwiazdor (2002) and Lawstorant (2005).

He finished a singing form of the secondary musical school in Łódź.

He used to play in Polish bands Tamerlane and Varius Manx.

In 2007 divorced his wife Dorota with whom he has two daughters.

== Discography ==
- Rozdział drugi (2009)
