= Janina Borońska =

Polish actress (1943–2026)

Janina Borońska-Łągwa
- Born: 16 June 1943; Litzmannstadt, Reichsgau Wartheland, Germany (now Łódź, Poland)
- Died: 5 February 2026 (aged 82)
- Occupation: Actress
- Years active: 1964–2000
- Children: Jacek Łągwa

Janina Borońska-Łągwa (16 June 1943 – 5 February 2026) was a Polish film and theatre actress, and the mother of the composer and vocalist Jacek Łągwa.

Borońska debuted in theater in 1966. In 1967, she graduated from the National Film School in Łódź. She obtained a master's degree in 1969. In 1985 and 2000, she was awarded the Cross of Merit (in silver and gold, respectively). Borońska died on 5 February 2026, at the age of 82.

== Selected filmography ==
- 1965: Return of doctor von Kniprode – girl at Klausen's (episode 2)
- 1967: More Than Life at Stake – radio-telegraphist Irena (episode 1)
- 1969: How I Unleashed World War II – Elżbieta
- 1970: Doctor Eve – Nina, Ewa's intern friend
- 1974: Seven sides of the world – mother of Lucek
- 1981: The Quack – a daughter of Prokop
- 1986: Cryptonym "Tourists” – Masne's colleague (episode 1)
- 1989: Janna
