= Katastrofa =

1966 Polish film

- Directed by: Sylwester Chęciński
- Written by: Sylwester Chęciński; Zbigniew Kubikowski
- Starring: Marta Lipińska
- Release date: 1965
- Running time: 86 minutes
- Country: Poland
- Language: Polish

Katastrofa is a 1965 Polish drama film directed by Sylwester Chęciński.

== Cast ==
- Marta Lipińska as Hanka
- Stanisław Niwiński as Grzegorz Hulewicz
- Aleksander Fogiel as Straw boss Bien
- Wiktor Grotowicz as Director Rozner
- Witold Pyrkosz as Inspector Witold Roszak
- Edmund Fetting as Rowicki
- Zbigniew Dobrzyński as Tomasz
- Zdzisław Maklakiewicz as Kotarski
- Antonina Girycz as Ewa
- Janusz Klosinski as Nowak
- Eliasz Kuziemski as Bien's lawyer
- Zofia Merle as Draughtswoman Zosia
- Leon Niemczyk as Prosecutor
