= Eliasz Kuziemski =

Polish actor

- Born: 30 July 1922; Kuty, Poland (now Kuty, Ukraine)
- Died: 1 June 2000 (aged 77); Wrocław, Poland
- Occupation: Actor
- Years active: 1956–1989

Eliasz Kuziemski (30 July 1922 – 1 June 2000) was a Polish actor. He appeared in more than 50 films and television shows between 1956 and 1989.

== Selected filmography ==
- Katastrofa (1965)
- Stawka większa niż życie (1967)
