= Hermann Brunner =

Fictional Polish television character

SS-Sturmbannführer Herman Brunner was a recurrent supporting character from the popular Polish TV series More Than Life at Stake (Stawka większa niż życie). Played by Emil Karewicz, he was the chief antagonist to the main character, Stanislaw Kolicki, a Polish spy impersonating a Nazi agent called Hans Kloss.

== Character description ==
A Sicherheitsdienst (sometimes incorrectly linked to Gestapo) officer in occupied Poland during World War II, Brunner is a ruthless Nazi official, who sometimes works with Lieutenant (later Captain) Hans Kloss of Abwehr, who is really Major Stanislaw Kolicki of Polish intelligence.

A "likable villain" who provides comic relief, Brunner is best known for the line, translated as, "I cannot look at a beaten man...if someone else is beating."

== Storylines ==
Near end of the war he tries to kidnap a renowned German professor, a specialist in rocket technology, in order to sell him to the western allies in exchange for his own safety and other benefits.

== Popularity ==
Although he appeared in just 5 of 18 episodes, Brunner became as popular a character as Kloss, sometimes even more popular. Despite his multiple sinister acts (in addition to his work in a repressive regime, he was also involved in an armed robbery, which left the wife of a high ranking NSDAP official dead), Brunner in part was a likeable character, due to his rascal-like sense of humor, and his lack of obvious involvement in violence on screen.

Many of Brunner's lines in the series are still widely known and quoted in Poland, for example:

- I hate to watch a man being beaten... unless I am beating him myself.
- Hello Hans, I knew I would find you here.
- Remember I'm always your friend, Hans.
- Brunner senses women and alcohol from a kilometer away.
