= Jan Koecher =

Polish actor

- Born: 16 January 1908; Warsaw, Russian Empire
- Died: 11 May 1981 (aged 73); Warsaw, Poland
- Occupation: Actor
- Years active: 1951-1980 (film)

Jan Koecher (1908–1981) was a Polish actor. He played the composer Stanisław Moniuszko in the 1951 film Warsaw Premiere.

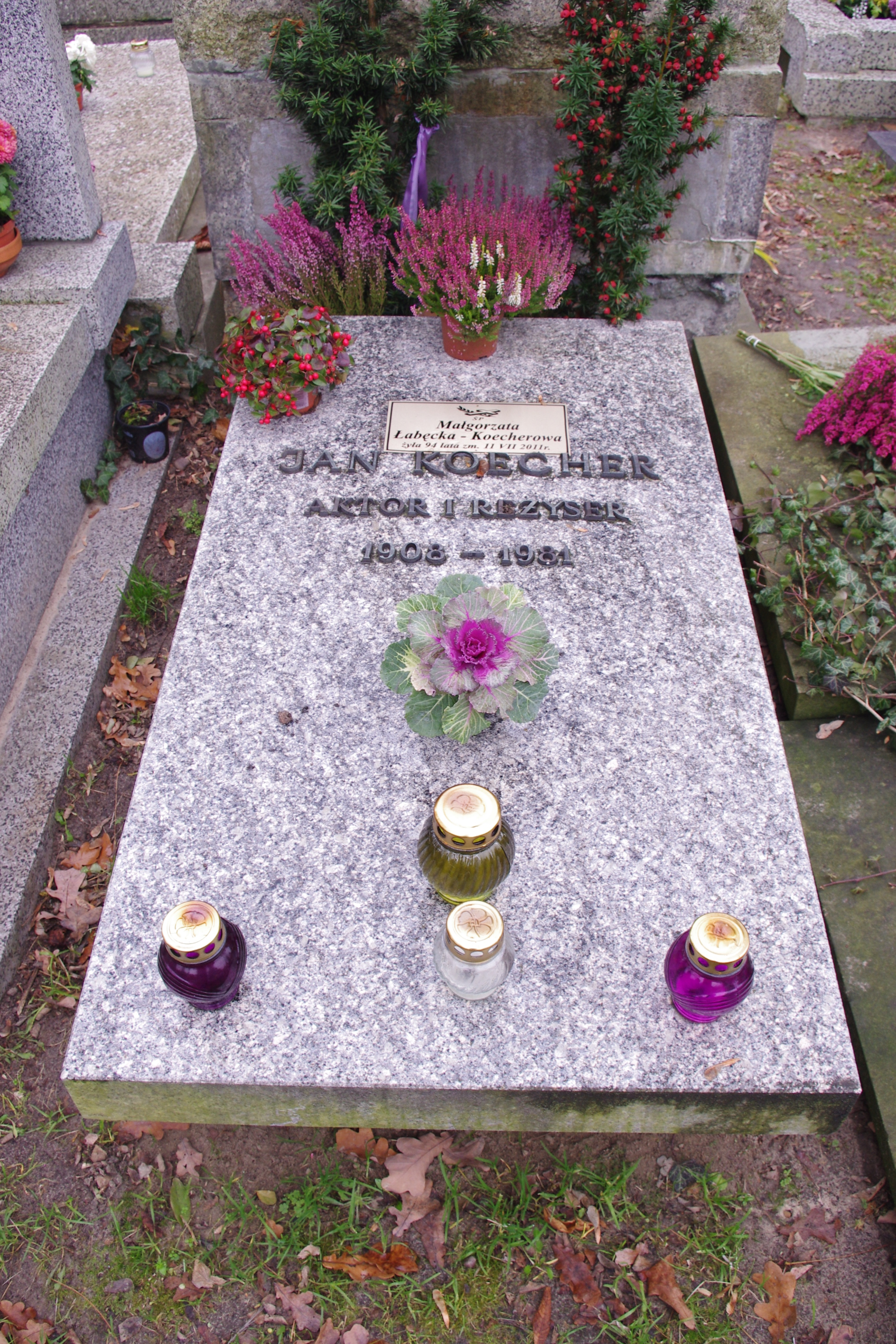
His graveyard

== Selected filmography ==
- Warsaw Premiere (1951)
- The Ashes (1965)
- The Doll (1968)

== Bibliography ==
- Falkowska, Janina. Andrzej Wajda: History, Politics, and Nostalgia in Polish Cinema. Berghahn Books, 2007.
