= Barbara Horawianka =

Polish actress (1930–2024)

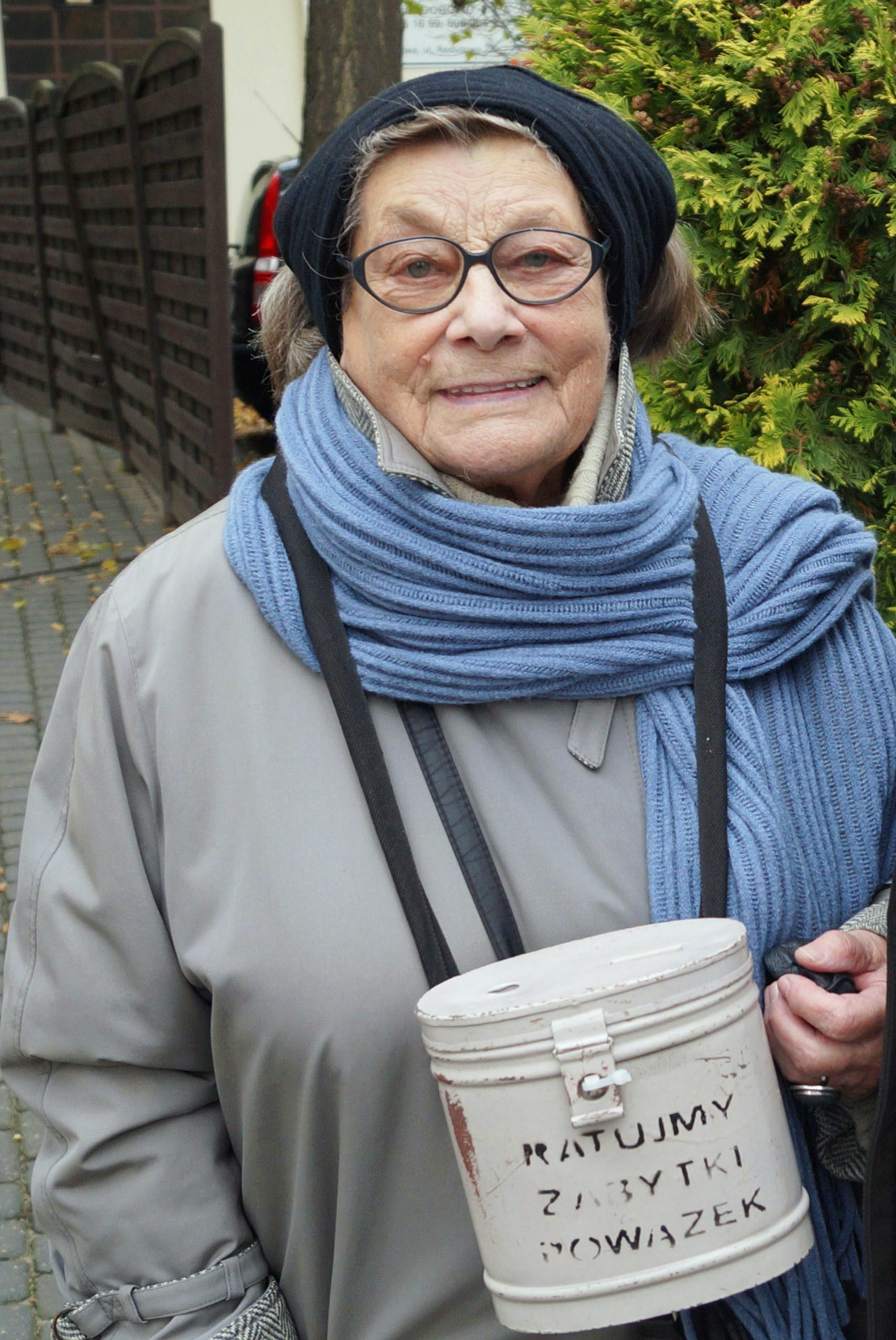
- Horawianka in 2016
- Born: 14 May 1930; Katowice, Poland
- Died: 20 September 2024 (aged 94); Warsaw, Poland
- Occupation: Actress
- Years active: 1955–2024

Barbara Horawianka (14 May 1930 – 20 September 2024) was a Polish film actress. She has appeared in more than 35 films and television shows since 1955 to 2024. She died in Praski Hospital in Warsaw, on 20 September 2024, at the age of 94.

== Selected filmography ==
- Tonight a City Will Die (1961)
- Passenger (1963)
- Stawka większa niż życie (1967)
