= Wacław Dybowski =

Polish cinematographer (1929–1984)

- Born: 14 August 1929; Uniejów
- Died: 3 June 1984 (aged 54); Białogard
- Citizenship: Polish
- Education: Łódź Film School
- Occupation: Cinematographer

Wacław Dybowski (14 August 1929 – 3 June 1984) was a cinematographer.

== Biography ==
In 1954 he graduated in cinematography from the Łódź Film School.

== Filmography ==
- Podziemny front (TV series, 1965)
- Kochajmy syrneki (1966)
- Pułapka (1970)
- Samochodzik i templariusze (TV series, 1971)
- The Promised Land (1974)
- Pójdziesz ponad sadem (1974)
- Obrazki z życia (1975)
- Zanim nadejdzie dzień (1976)
- Olśnienie (1976)
- Zapach ziemi (1977)
- Zakręt (1977)
- Pogrzeb świerszcza (1978)
- Polonia Restituta (1980)
- Czerwone węże (1981)
- Katastrofa w Gibraltarze (1983)
- Pobojowisko (1984)

Source.

== Awards ==
- Knight's Cross of the Order of Polonia Restituta (1983)
