= Tadeusz Pluciński =

Polish actor (1926–2019)

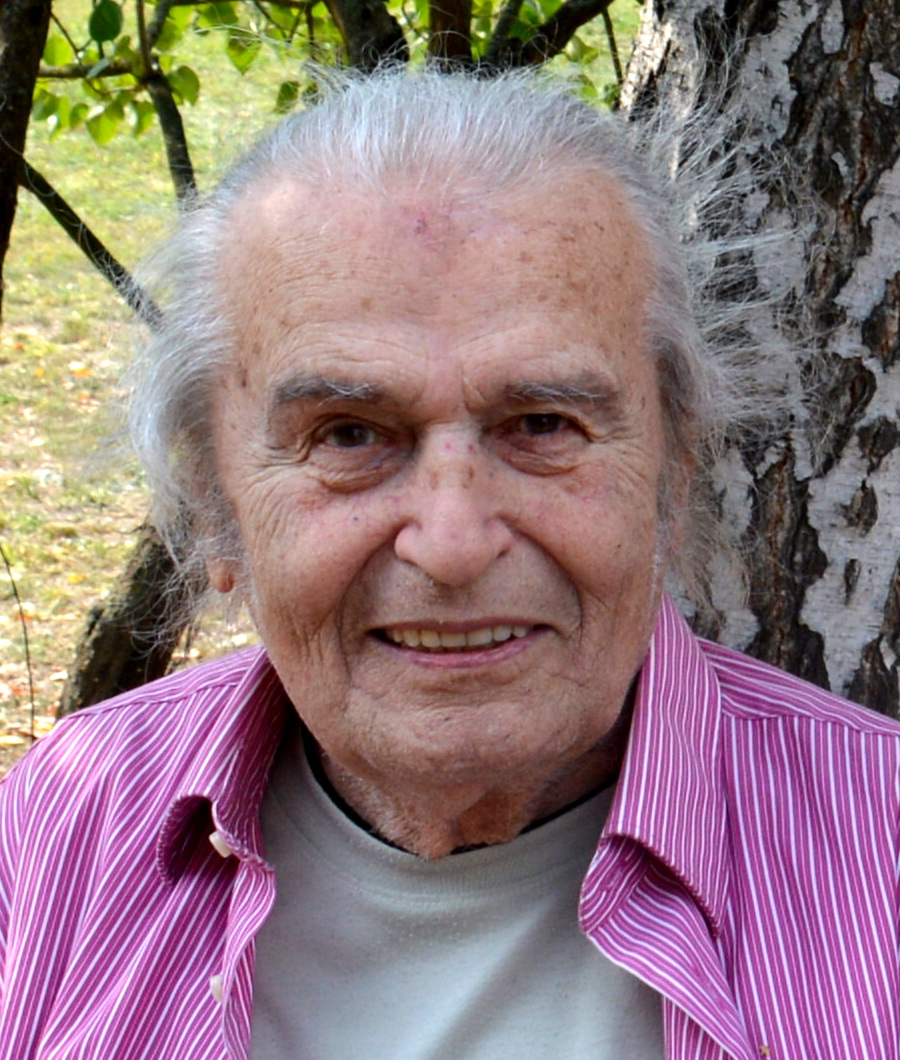
- Born: 25 September 1926; Łódź, Poland
- Died: 23 April 2019 (aged 92); Konstancin-Jeziorna, Poland
- Occupation: Actor
- Years active: 1951–2014

Tadeusz Leszek Pluciński (25 September 1926 – 23 April 2019) was a Polish actor. He appeared in more than 40 films and television shows beginning in 1951.

== Selected filmography ==
- Warsaw Premiere (1951)
- Westerplatte (1967)
- Stawka większa niż życie (1967)
- Podróż za jeden uśmiech (1972)
- Czterdziestolatek (1974)
