= Emil Karewicz =

Polish actor (1923–2020)

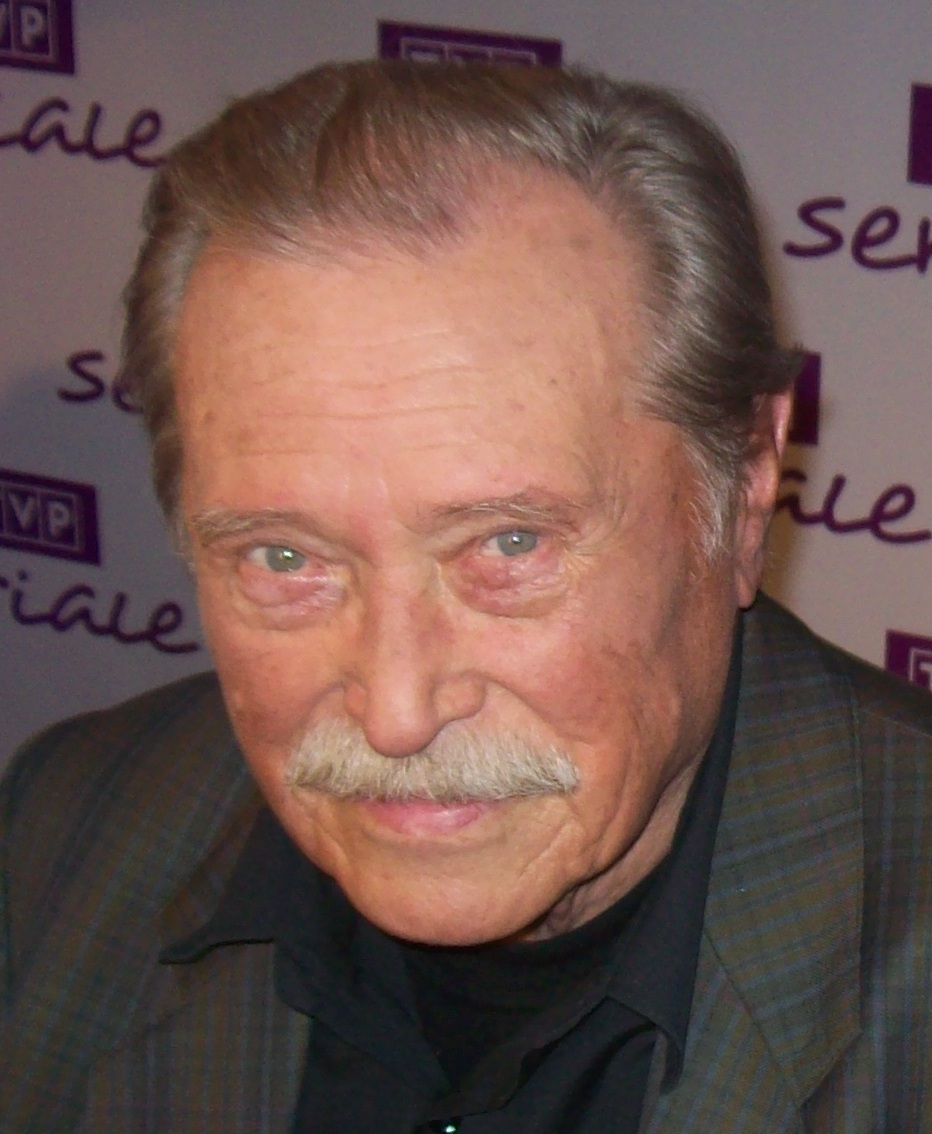
- Emil Karewicz
- Born: 13 March 1923; Wilno, Poland (now Vilnius, Lithuania)
- Died: 18 March 2020 (aged 97)
- Occupation: Actor
- Years active: 1948–2015
- Spouses: Ewa (m. 1941–1946) Delfina (m. 1946–1950) Teresa (m. 1950–2012)
- Children: 3

Emil Karewicz (13 March 1923 – 18 March 2020) was a Polish actor.

== Early life ==
His acting career began in Wilno, at the local theatre, where he played the role of a monkey in the "Quartet" by Ivan Krylov. During World War II he served in the Polish Army. He fought in the Battle of Berlin in 1945.

== Career ==
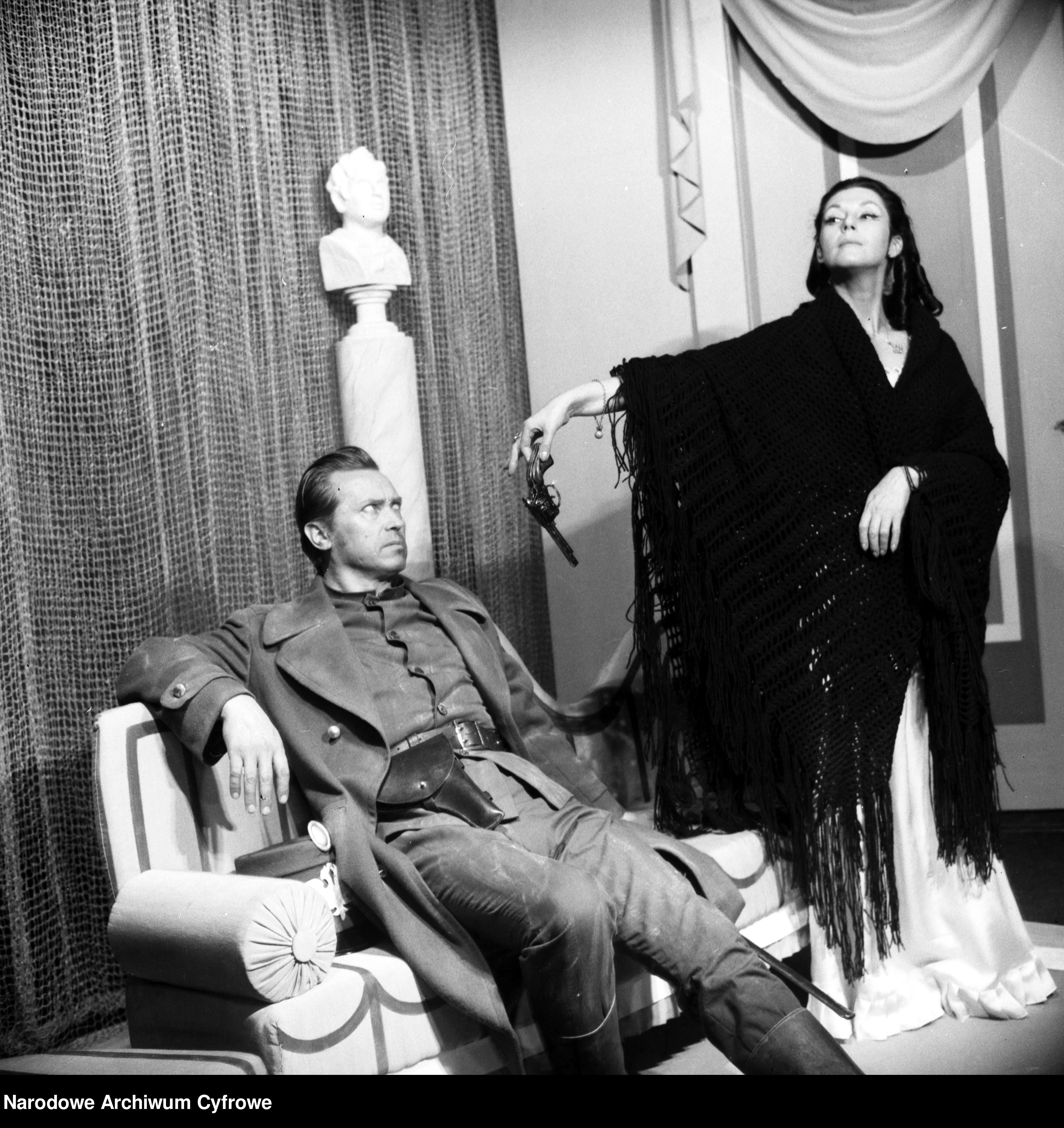
Karewicz (seated) and Ewa Berger-Jankowska performing at the Teatru Ludowego in Warsaw, 1971

After the war, he graduated from Iwo Gall Theatrical Studio (along with Ryszard Barycz, Bronisław Pawlik and Barbara Krafftówna). He played on stages in Łódź, mostly in the Jaracz Theatre and the New Theatre. Since 1962 he performed in Warsaw, in the Ateneum Theatre (Teatr Ateneum im. Stefana Jaracza w Warszawie), the Dramatic Theatre (Teatr Dramatyczny w Warszawie), and the New Theatre (Teatr Nowy w Warszawie 1947-2005). He retired in 1983. He died on 18 March 2020, five days after turning 97.

== Fame ==
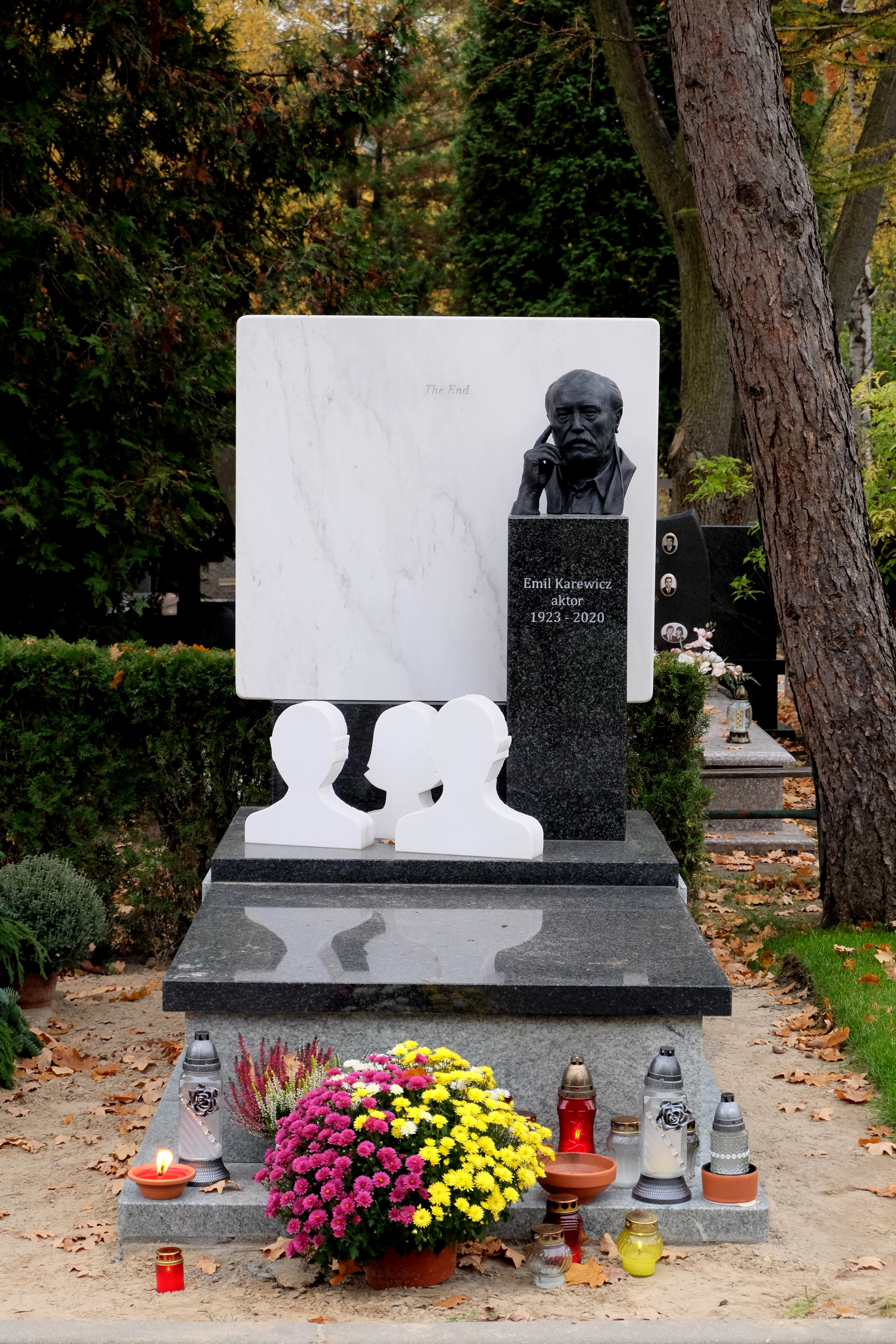
Grave of Karewicz at the Powązki Military Cemetery

He earned popularity while performing roles of SS-Sturmbannführer Hermann Brunner in TV Series Stawka większa niż życie and SS-Obersturmführer in the film Jak rozpętałem drugą wojnę światową and King Władysław II Jagiełło in Krzyżacy.

== Selected filmography ==
- Warsaw Premiere (Warszawska premiera) (1951)
- Youth of Chopin (Młodość Chopina) (1952)
- Kanał (1957)
- Pętla aka The Noose (1958)
- The Eighth Day of the Week (1958)
- Krzyżacy (1960)
- Tonight a City Will Die (W nocy umrze miasto) (1961)
- Na białym szlaku (1962)
- How I Unleashed World War II (Jak rozpętałem drugą wojnę światową) (1969)
- Hubal (1973)
- Wszyscy i nikt (1977)
- Sekret Enigmy (Enigma Secret) (1979)
- Polonia Restituta (1981)
- Katastrofa w Gibraltarze (1984)
- Hans Kloss. Stawka większa niż śmierć (2012)

=== TV series ===
- Stawka większa niż życie (1967–1968)
- Lalka (1978)
- Alternatywy 4 (1983)
- Barwy szczęścia (2007–2013)
