= Halina Kossobudzka =

Polish actress

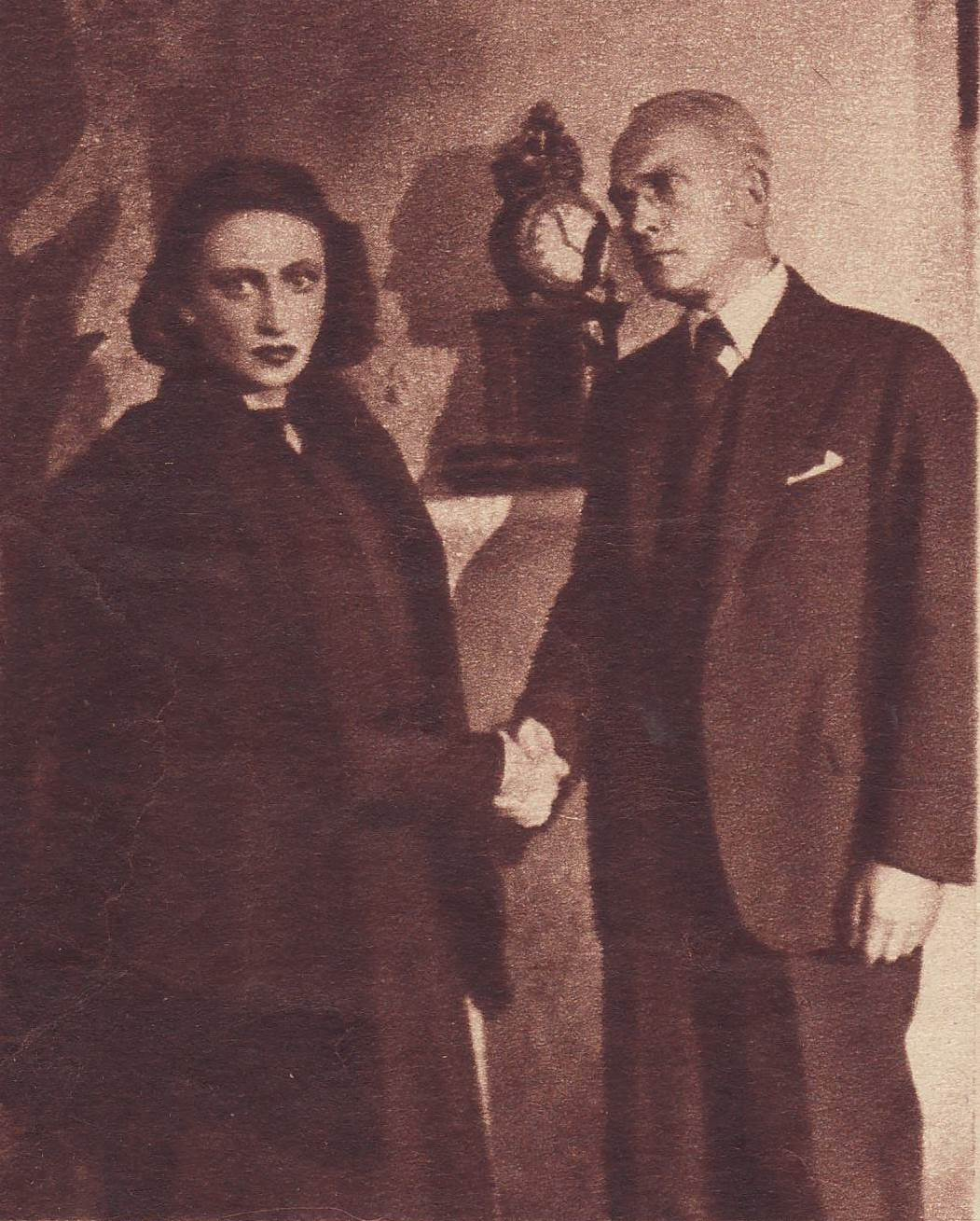
- Halina Kossobudzka (left) in 1946
- Born: 29 August 1920; Grudziądz, Poland
- Died: 26 July 1994 (aged 73); Warsaw, Poland
- Occupation: Actress
- Years active: 1961–1987

Halina Kossobudzka (29 August 1920 – 26 July 1994) was a Polish actress. She appeared in more than twenty films and television shows between 1961 and 1987.

== Selected filmography ==
- Panienka z okienka (1964)
