= Barbara Krafftówna =

Polish actress (1928–2022)

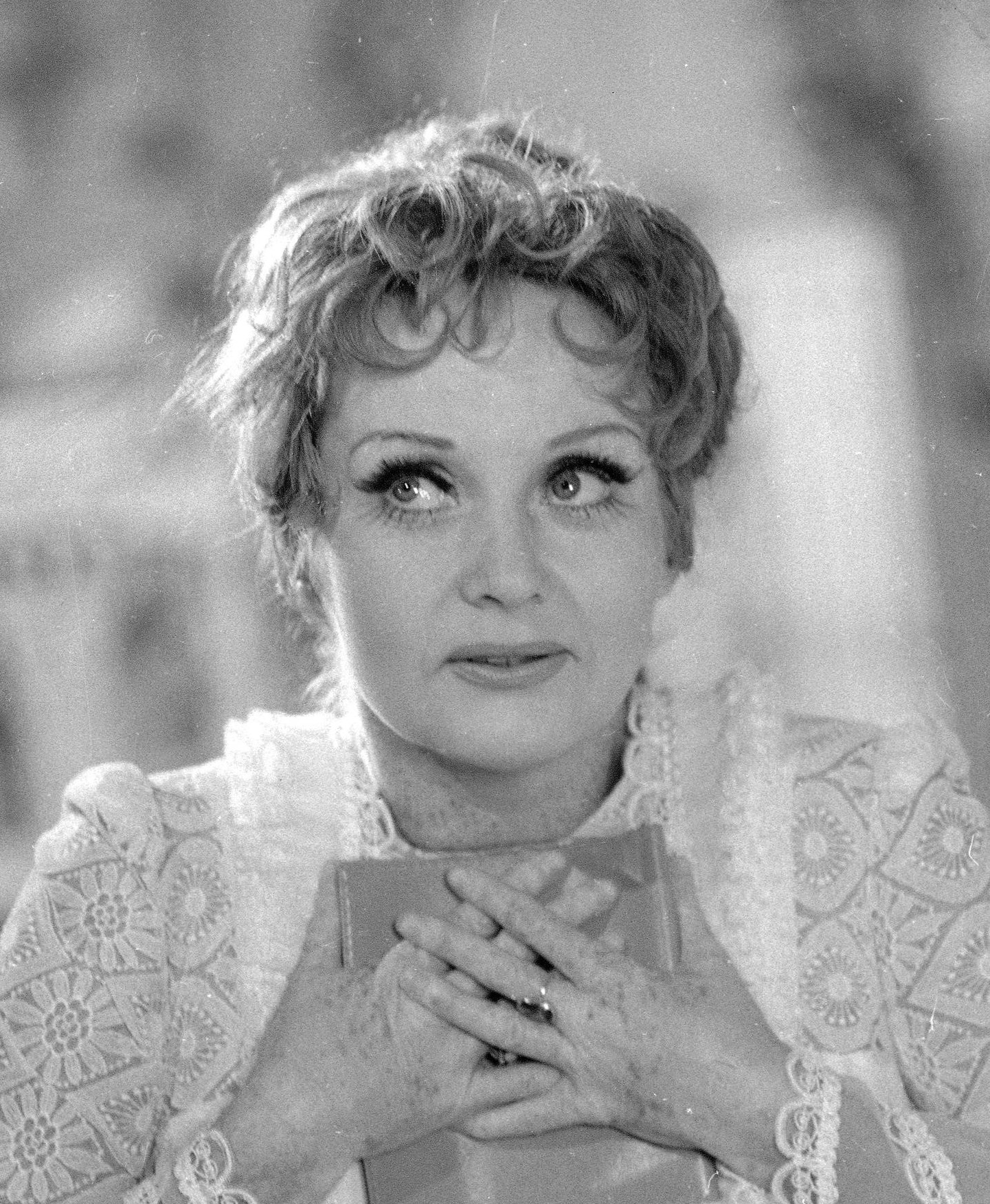
- Krafftówna (1969)
- Born: Barbara Krafft-Seidner; 5 December 1928; Warsaw, Poland
- Died: 23 January 2022 (aged 93); Konstancin-Jeziorna, Poland
- Occupation: Actress
- Years active: 1946–2022
- Spouse(s): Michał Gazda (m. 1956; died 1969) Arnold Seidner (m. 1986; died 1986)
- Children: 1

Barbara Krafftówna (actually Barbara Krafft-Seidner; 5 December 1928 – 23 January 2022) was a Polish actress whose career spanned theatre, film, television and cabaret. (Note: In English-language sources, her surname is sometimes transliterated without the Polish diacritics.) She was widely recognised for film roles in Ashes and Diamonds (1958), Nobody Calls (1960), How to Be Loved (1962) and The Saragossa Manuscript (1965), among others.

Krafftówna died on 23 January 2022, aged 93, in Skolimów (Konstancin-Jeziorna), where she lived at the Polish Actors’ Veterans’ Home (Dom Artystów Weteranów Scen Polskich).

== Early life and education ==
Krafftówna was born in Warsaw. During World War II, she studied acting at Iwo Gall’s underground drama studio in Kraków, graduating in 1946.

== Career ==
=== Theatre ===
She made her stage debut in 1946 with Teatr Wybrzeże in the Tri-City area, later performing at major theatres in Łódź, Wrocław and Warsaw, including Teatr Dramatyczny and the National Theatre.

In 1982 she moved to the United States and worked primarily with Polish émigré theatre, living first in San Francisco and later in Los Angeles; she returned permanently to Poland in 1998.

In 2006, marking her 60th year of artistic work, she appeared in the monodrama Błękitny diabeł (The Blue Devil), written by Remigiusz Grzela and co-directed by Józef Opalski.

=== Film and television ===
Krafftówna appeared in dozens of films and television productions from the 1950s through the 2020s. A key role in her film career was Felicja in Wojciech Jerzy Has’s How to Be Loved (1962).

On television, she was known to mass audiences for her roles in series such as Four Tank-Men and a Dog and The Adventures of Sir Michael (Przygody pana Michała).

=== Cabaret and song ===
From 1959 to 1966, Krafftówna performed in Kabaret Starszych Panów (The Cabaret of the Elderly Gentlemen), a landmark Polish television cabaret created by Jeremi Przybora and Jerzy Wasowski, and became associated with its signature songs and sketches.

=== Public service ===
Between 1961 and 1965, she served as a councillor of the District National Council of Warsaw Śródmieście (People’s Poland).

== Personal life ==
In 1956, she married actor Michał Gazda; they had one son. After moving to the United States in the early 1980s, she married Arnold Seidner (1986).

== Honours and awards ==
Krafftówna received multiple Polish state and cultural distinctions, including the Order of Polonia Restituta (Commander’s Cross with Star, 2019) and the Gold Medal for Merit to Culture – Gloria Artis (2006).

== Selected filmography ==
- Sprawa do załatwienia (1953)
- Ashes and Diamonds (1958)
- Nobody Calls (1960)
- Tonight a City Will Die (1961)
- How to Be Loved (1962)
- Heat (1964)
- The Saragossa Manuscript (1965)
- The Codes (1966)
- Kill It and Leave This Town (2021) (voice)

== Bibliography ==
- Remigiusz Grzela, Krafftówna w krainie czarów. Prószyński i S-ka, Warsaw, 2016. ISBN 9788380692350.
