= Jadwiga Kuryluk =

Polish film actress (1912–1995)

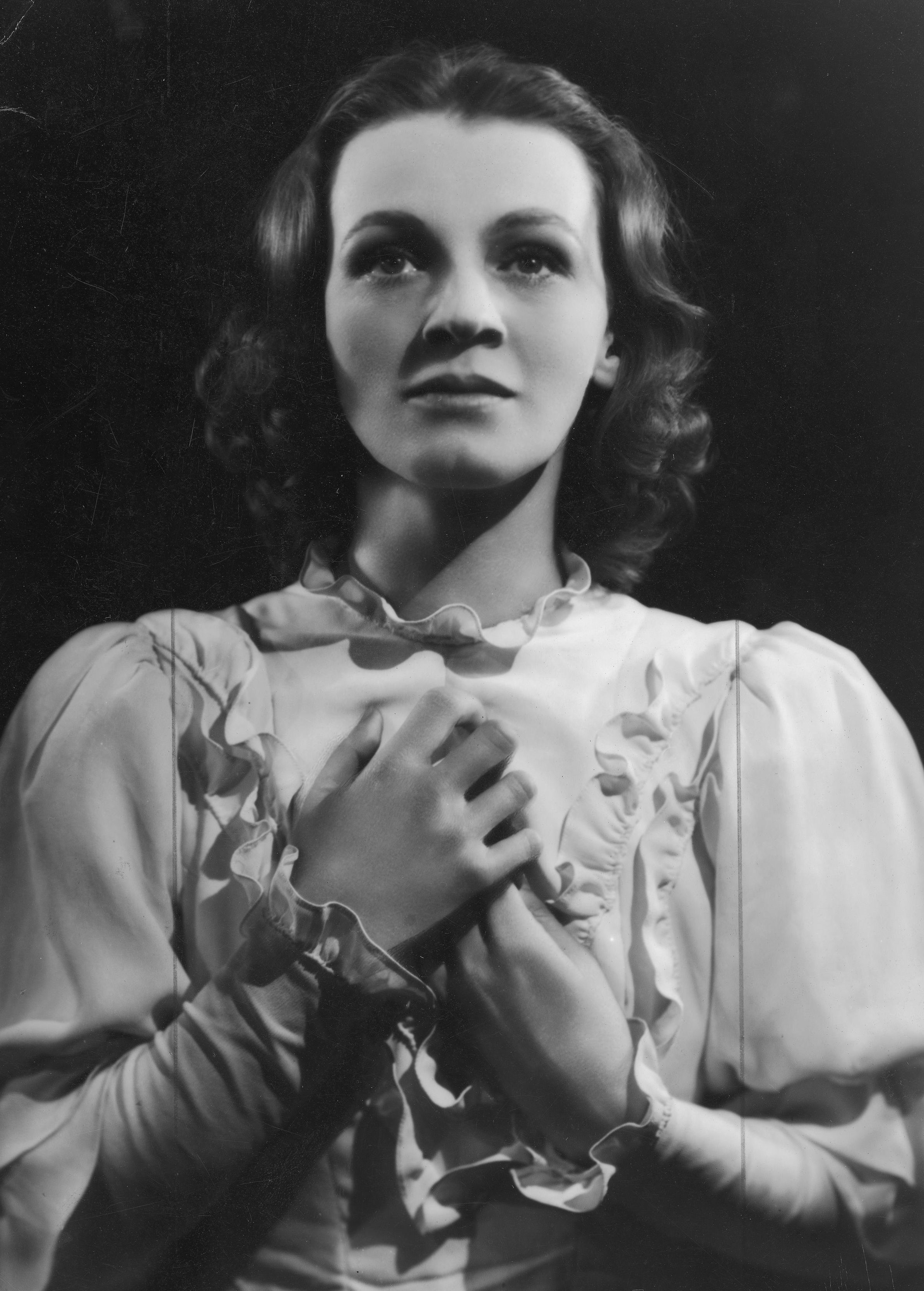
- Born: 25 September 1912; Skierniewice, Congress Poland
- Died: 30 April 1995 (aged 82); Warsaw, Poland
- Occupation: Actress
- Years active: 1958–1987

Jadwiga Kuryluk (25 September 1912 – 30 April 1995) was a Polish film actress. She appeared in more than 30 films and television shows between 1958 and 1987.

== Selected filmography ==
- Tonight a City Will Die (1961)
