= The Eighth Day of the Week =

1958 film

- Directed by: Aleksander Ford
- Starring: Sonja Ziemann; Zbigniew Cybulski
- Edited by: Halina Prugar-Ketling
- Release date: 26 August 1958
- Running time: 1h 25min
- Countries: Poland; Germany
- Language: Polish

The Eighth Day of the Week (Polish: Ósmy dzień tygodnia) is a 1958 Polish-German drama film directed by Aleksander Ford.

== Cast ==
- Sonja Ziemann - Agnieszka Walicka
- Zbigniew Cybulski - Piotr Terlecki
- Jan Świderski - Journalist
- Barbara Połomska - Ela
- Ilse Steppat - Walicka
- Emil Karewicz - Zawadzki
- Bum Krüger - Stefan Walicki
- Zbigniew Wójcik - Painter
- Leon Niemczyk - Ciapus
- Tadeusz Łomnicki - Grzegorz Walicki
