= Wiktor Grotowicz =

Polish actor (1919–1985)

- Born: 23 October 1919; Białystok, Poland
- Died: 19 December 1985 (aged 66); Wroclaw, Poland
- Occupation: Actor
- Years active: 1954–1985

Wiktor Grotowicz (23 October 1919 – 19 December 1985) was a Polish actor. He appeared in more than 45 films and television shows between 1954 and 1985.

== Selected filmography ==
- Katastrofa (1965)
- Colonel Wolodyjowski (1969)
- Fever (1981)
- Dreszcze (1981)
