= Andrzej Krasicki =

Polish film/theatre actor and theatre director

Andrzej Krasicki (31 October 1918, Tarnów, Poland – 15 January 1996, Warsaw) was a Polish film and theatre actor and theatre director.

== Biography ==
In 1937, he graduated from Staszic high school in Warsaw. He was the Administrative Director of the Warsaw theaters: the Municipal Theatre of Drama (1945-1948), General (1949-1951), a young Warsaw (1952-1953 and 1955–1957), Polish (1953-1955 and 1957–1981), the National - Deputy Director (1983-1990).

== Filmography ==
- Katastrofa w Gibraltarze (1984)
