= Panienka z okienka =

- Directed by: Maria Kaniewska
- Written by: Jan Marcin Szancer
- Starring: Pola Raksa
- Release date: 18 December 1964
- Running time: 155 minutes
- Country: Poland
- Language: Polish

Panienka z okienka is a 1964 Polish romance film directed by Maria Kaniewska.

== Cast ==
- Pola Raksa as Hedwiga / Marysia Kalinowska
- Jadwiga Chojnacka as Mina - maid
- Aleksandra Karzyńska as Mrs. Flora
- Halina Kossobudzka as Salomea Korycka
- Wiesława Kwaśniewska as Fruzia - Flora's maid
- Małgorzata Szancer as Krysia
- Krzysztof Chamiec as Cornelius
- Mariusz Dmochowski as Duke Jerzy Ossolinski
- Kazimierz Fabisiak as Johannes Szulc
- Janusz Gajos as Pietrek
