= Marta Lipińska =

Polish actress (born 1940)

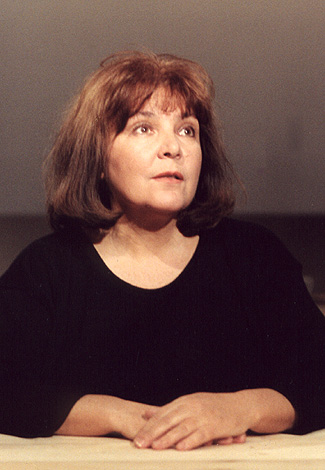
- Marta Lipińska
- Born: 14 May 1940 (age 86); Boryslav, Ukrainian SSR, Soviet Union
- Occupation: Actress
- Years active: 1962–2016
- Spouse: Maciej Englert
- Children: 2, including Michał Englert

Marta Lipińska (born 14 May 1940) is a Polish actress. She appeared in more than 40 films and television shows since 1962.

== Selected filmography ==
- Katastrofa (1965)
- Salto (1965)
- Nad Niemnem (1986)
