= Tonight a City Will Die =

1961 film

- Directed by: Jan Rybkowski
- Written by: Leon Kruczkowski; Jan Rybkowski
- Starring: Andrzej Łapicki
- Cinematography: Boguslaw Lambach
- Release date: 4 September 1961
- Running time: 84 minutes
- Country: Poland
- Language: Polish

Tonight a City Will Die (Polish: Dziś w nocy umrze miasto) is a 1961 Polish drama film directed by Jan Rybkowski which presents the tragedy of Dresden during bombings between 13 and 14 February 1945, as seen through the eyes of Polish forced laborers. It was entered into the 2nd Moscow International Film Festival where Boguslaw Lambach won the Silver Prize for Director of Photography.

== Cast ==
- Andrzej Łapicki as Piotr
- Beata Tyszkiewicz as Magda
- Jadwiga Chojnacka as Aunt Poldi
- Ignacy Gogolewski as SS Lt. Eryk
- Bernard Hecht as French Man
- Barbara Horawianka as Blonde Girl
- Kalina Jędrusik as Prostitute
- Emil Karewicz as Kurt Zumpe
- Elżbieta Kępińska as Worker
- Barbara Krafftówna as Iza
- Jadwiga Kuryluk as Weronika Zumpe
- Danuta Szaflarska as Italian cirkus performer
- Zdzisław Mrożewski as Professor
- Stanisław Łapiński as German in Shelter
