= Barbara Kostrzewska =

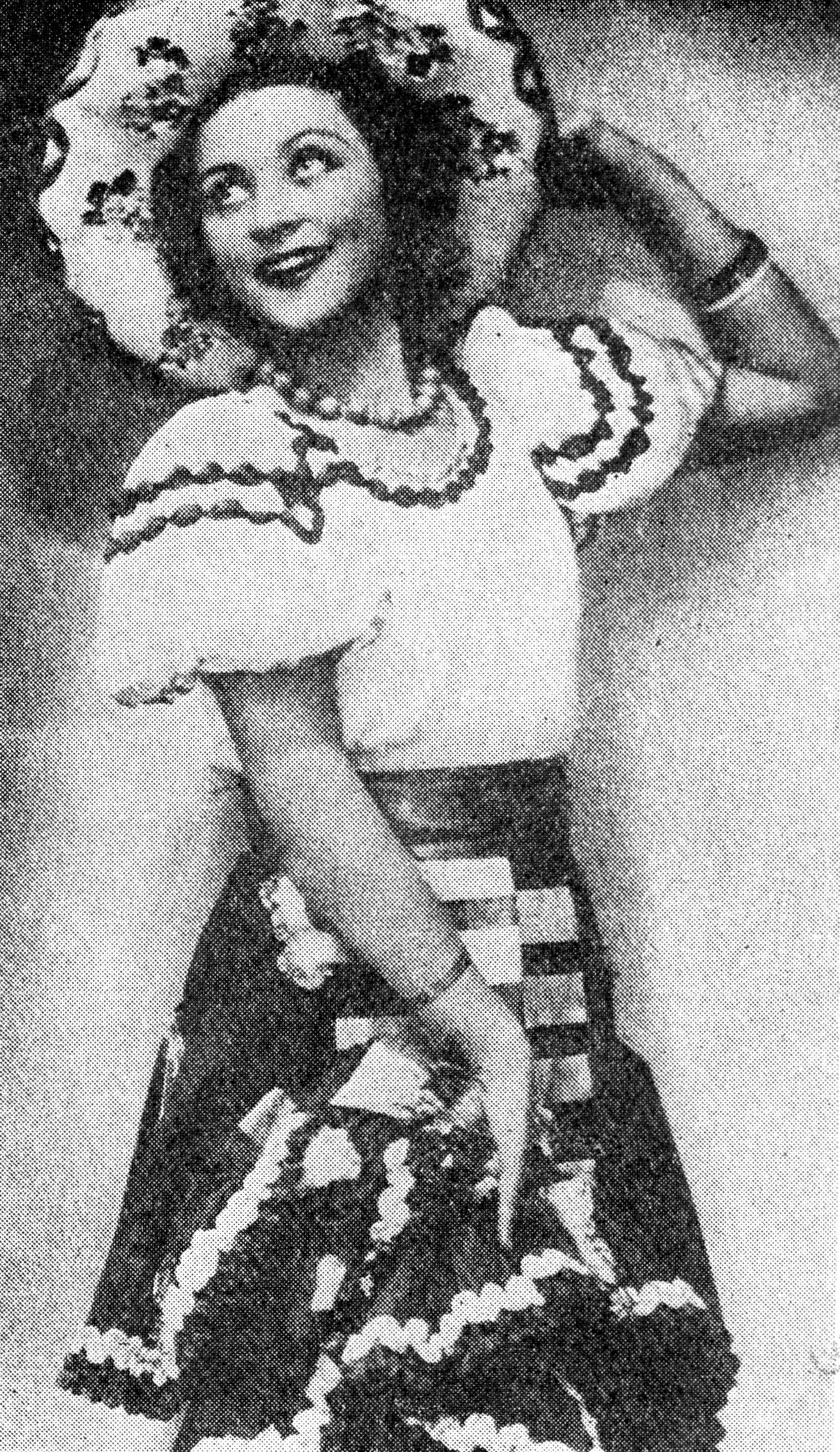
Barbara Kostrzewska

Barbara Kostrzewska (21 October 1915 in Jodłowa – 14 November 1986 in Warsaw) was a Polish singer and theater director. She performed from late 1930s until after the war, when she became involved in managing several theaters. During World War II she worked for Polish resistance Armia Krajowa and took part in the Warsaw Uprising. She starred in the 1951 film Warsaw Premiere.
