= Wiesława Kwaśniewska =

Polish actress (born 1933)

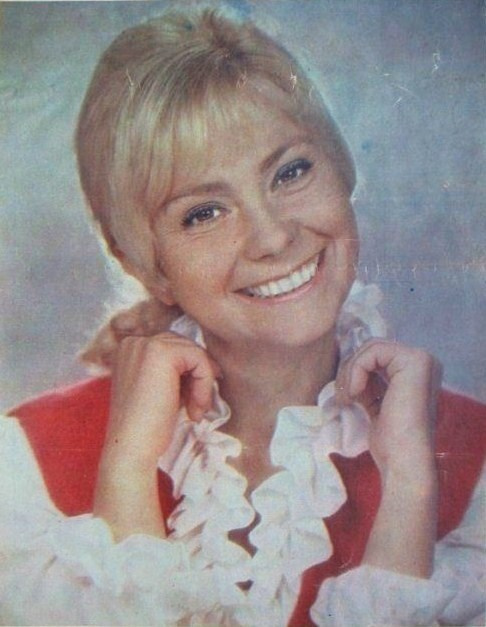
- Wiesława Kwaśniewska (1973)
- Born: 16 June 1933 (age 93); Łódź, Poland
- Occupation: Actress
- Years active: 1951–1984

Wiesława Kwaśniewska (born 16 June 1933) is a Polish actress. She appeared in more than twenty films and television shows between 1951 and 1984.

== Selected filmography ==
- How to Be Loved (1963)
- Panienka z okienka (1964)
