= Zygmunt Zintel =

Polish actor (1911–1990)

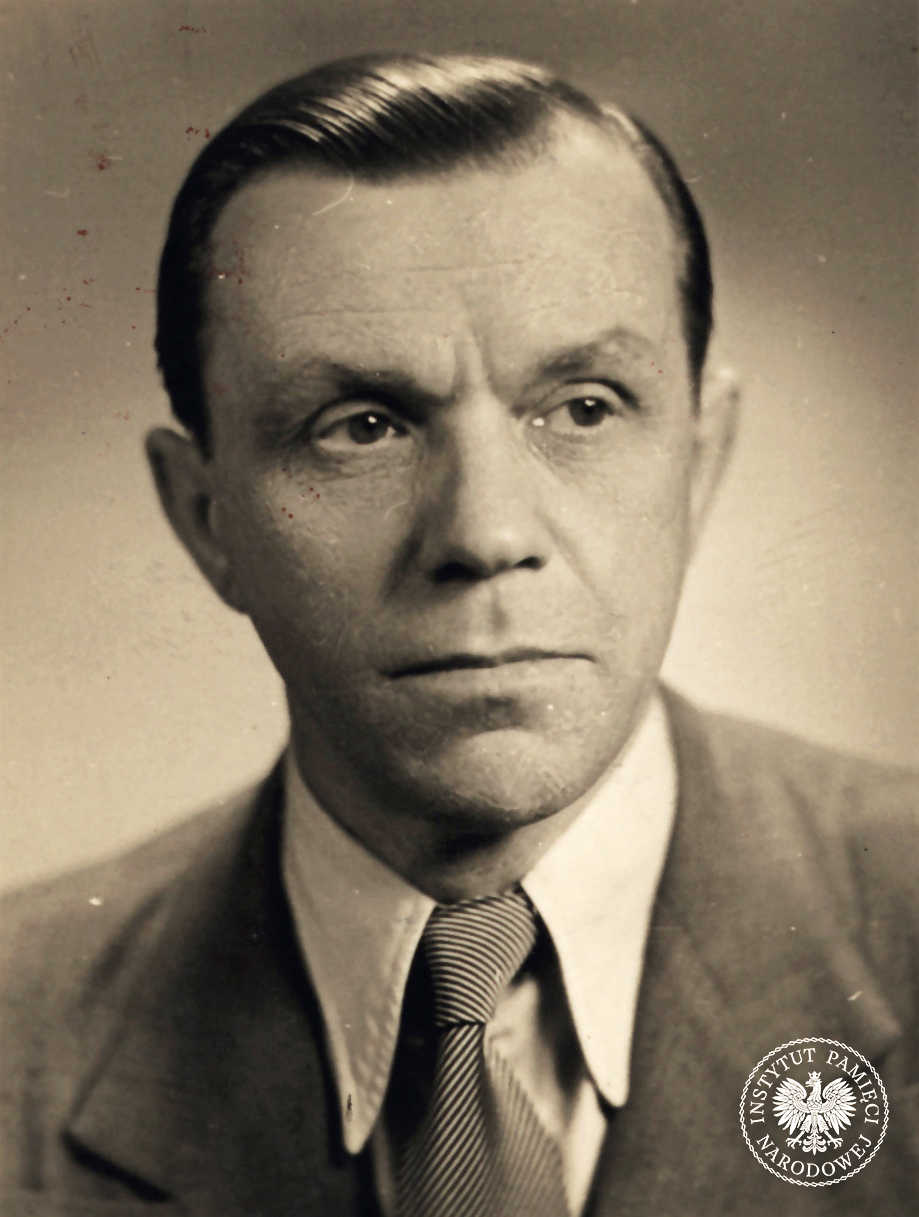
- Born: 2 April 1911; Warsaw, Congress Poland
- Died: 30 September 1990 (aged 79); Łódź, Poland
- Education: National Institute of Theatre Arts of Warsaw
- Occupations: Actor; teacher

Zygmunt Zintel (2 April 1911 – 30 September 1990) was a Polish and actor and educator. He was also a soldier for Poland during the Invasion of Poland.

== Biography ==
Zinetel was born on 2 April 1911 in Warsaw, Congress Poland (present-day Poland). In the years from 1929 to 1932, he took part in amateur productions from the Towarzystwo Uniwersytetu Robotniczego in the Ateneum Theatre in Warsaw.

In 1937 he graduated from the faculty of acting at the National Institute of Theatre Arts of Warsaw. For the season 1937-1938 was engaged to the Municipal Theatre in Lviv, where he made his debut as a bollard in the Legend by Stanisław Wyspiański.

Zintel took part in the counterattack against the German forces during the Invasion of Poland. He was a soldier of the Polish Army in the east. He returned to the country in 1947, and, for the season of 1947/48, was engaged at the Miejskich Dramatic Theatre in Warsaw. From 1948 to 1949, he performed at the Powszechny Theatre in Łódź. In the years 1949 to 1953 he was an actor of the Polski Theatre in Poznań. He then moved to Łódź and in the years 1953 to 1956 reappeared at the Powszechny Theatre, and in the years 1956-1980 in the New Theatre. In the beginning of the 50s, for several years he taught at the National Film School in Łódź.

In the 50s, he slowly departed from working in the theatre for a film career. He played more than 100 roles in films, mostly secondary. Due to the psycho-physical conditions often was cast as a villain, in the roles of suspects, petty thugs, but is also known for his many comic roles.

In 1966, in Panama at IV International Film Festival, he received the "Tribunascope" for Best Supporting Actor (Wołodkowicza) in the film Mother Joan of the Angels.

On 30 September 1990, Zintel died in Łódź aged 79.
