= Jan Gniński =

Polish politician

Jan Gniński (died c.1685) was a diplomat for the Polish–Lithuanian Commonwealth, Treasurer of the Crown Court. He was Vice-Chancellor of the Crown from 1681, voivode of Malbork in 1681, governor from 1668 to 1680 of Chelm and was an MP in the Sejm. He participated in the Polish-Swedish wars and the Siege of Vienna (1683) and was known to be an Ambassador to Turkey.

Jan Gniński was married to Dorota Jaskólska. They had five children:

- Jan Chryzostom Benedykt
- Jan Krzysztof Gniński, voivode of Pomorze
- Władysław
- Anna Franciszka
- Konstancja Dorota (d. 1705)
