= Maria Kaniewska =

Polish actor and director

- Born: 27 May 1911; Kiev, Russian Empire (now Ukraine)
- Died: 11 December 2005 (aged 94); Warsaw, Poland
- Occupations: Director, actress and screenwriter
- Years active: 1933–2005

Maria Kaniewska (27 May 1911 in Kiev – 11 December 2005 in Warsaw) was a Polish actress, screenplay writer, film director.

She debuted on 14 October 1933 in the Toruń City Theater after graduating from the Acting Department of State Institute of Theatrical Arts in Warsaw. In 1948 Kaniewska finished her study at the National Film School in Łódź as a movie director and was offered a job there as well. In 1960 she received a bronze lion award at the Venice Film Festival.

== Selected filmography ==
Actress

- The Last Stage (1947)
- Warsaw Premiere (1951)
- Bad Luck (1960)
- Pięciu (1964)

Director

- Niedaleko Warszawy (Not far from Warsaw) (1954)
- Awantura o Basię (Argument about Basia) (1959)
- Szatan z siódmej klasy (Satan from the seventh grade) (1960)
- Komedianty (Comedians) (1961)
- Panienka z okienka (Lady in a window) (1964)
- Bicz Boży (1966)
- Pierścień księżnej Anny (Ring of Princess Anna) (1970).
- Zaczarowane podwórko (Enchanted yard) (1974)
