= Statues of Kargul and Pawlak =

Monument in Toruń, Poland

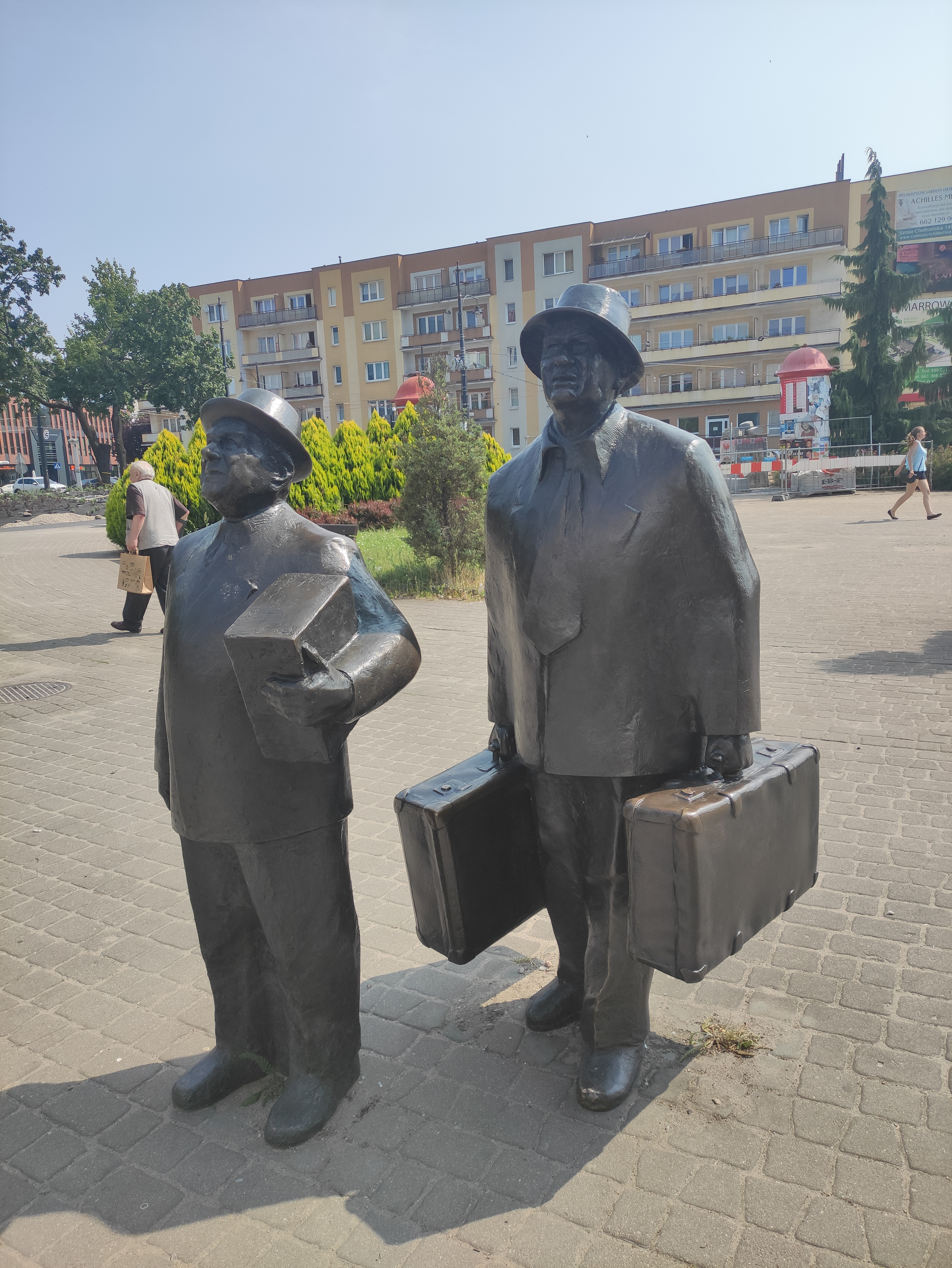
- The statues in 2023.
- Interactive map of Statues of Kargul and Pawlak
- Location: Chief Technical Organisation Square, Chełmińskie Przedmieście, Toruń, Poland
- Coordinates: 53.015402°N 18.601354°E
- Designer: Zbigniew Mikielewicz
- Type: Statue
- Material: Bronze
- Opening date: 11 February 2006

The statues of Kargul and Pawlak (Polish pronunciation: [ˈkar.ɡul … pav.lak]; Polish: Pomnik Kargula i Pawlaka) is a bronze monument in Toruń, Poland, placed at the Chief Technical Organisation Square, at the corner of Chełm Road and Red Road, within the district of Chełmińskie Przedmieście. It stands in front of the Cinema City multiplex. The statues depict Władysław Kargul and Kazimierz Pawlak, two main characters from the comedy film trilogy by Sylwester Chęciński, consisting of All Friends Here (1967), Take It Easy, and Love or Leave (1977). They were portrayed by Władysław Hańcza and Wacław Kowalski, respectively. The monument was designed by Zbigniew Mikielewicz, and unveiled on 11 February 2006.

== History ==
The monument was designed by sculptor Zbigniew Mikielewicz, and unveiled on 11 February 2006. It was founded by the owners of the cinema multiplex, in front of which it was unveiled. Originally, it was planned to commemorate the 1970 comedy film The Cruise, however it was decided against, as its propagators wanted it to stand on the coast of the Vistula river.

== Characteristics ==
The monument consists of two bronze statues depicting Władysław Kargul and Kazimierz Pawlak, two main characters from the comedy film trilogy by Sylwester Chęciński, consisting of All Friends Here (1967), Take It Easy, and Love or Leave (1977). They were portrayed by Władysław Hańcza and Wacław Kowalski, respectively. The characters are depicted as seen in the scene of the film Love or Leave, in which they just arrived to Chicago, United States, and are shocked seeing American metropolis, in contrast to their small Polish village. The statue of Pawlak, on the right, is depicted holding two suitcases, while Kargul holds a chest in his right arm close to his chest. They are wearing suits and top hats. The characters are looking towards the neon sign of the cinema multiplex in fron of whych they are placed. The statues are located at the Chief Technical Organisation Square, at the corner of Chełm Road and Red Road.
