= Jerzy Duszyński (actor) =

Polish actor

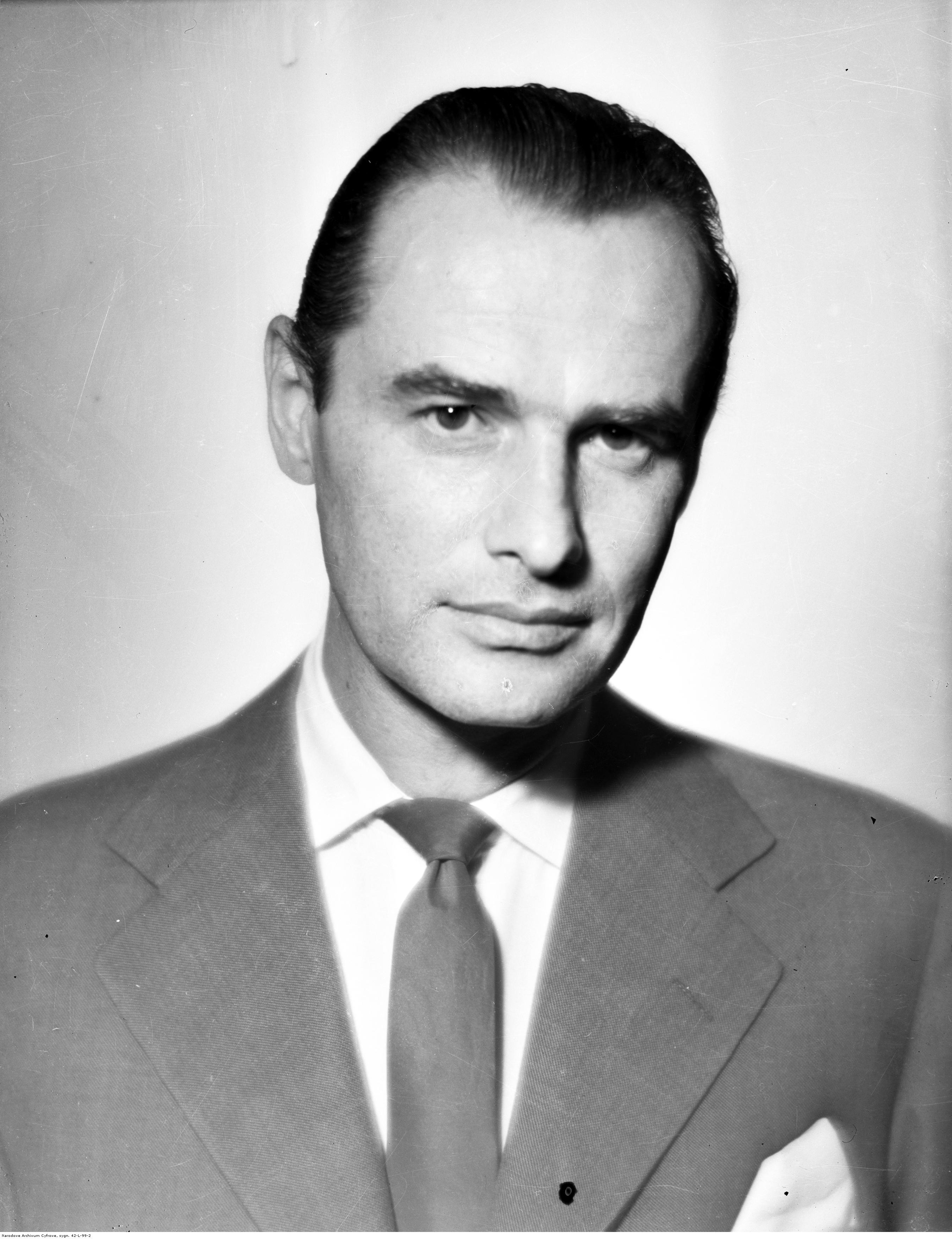
- Born: Jerzy Duszyński; 15 May 1917; Moscow, Russia
- Died: 23 July 1978 (aged 61); Warsaw, Poland
- Occupation: Actor
- Years active: 1939 ─ 1978
- Spouse(s): Hanka Bielicka (1943–1953); Helena Urbaniak (1964–1978)

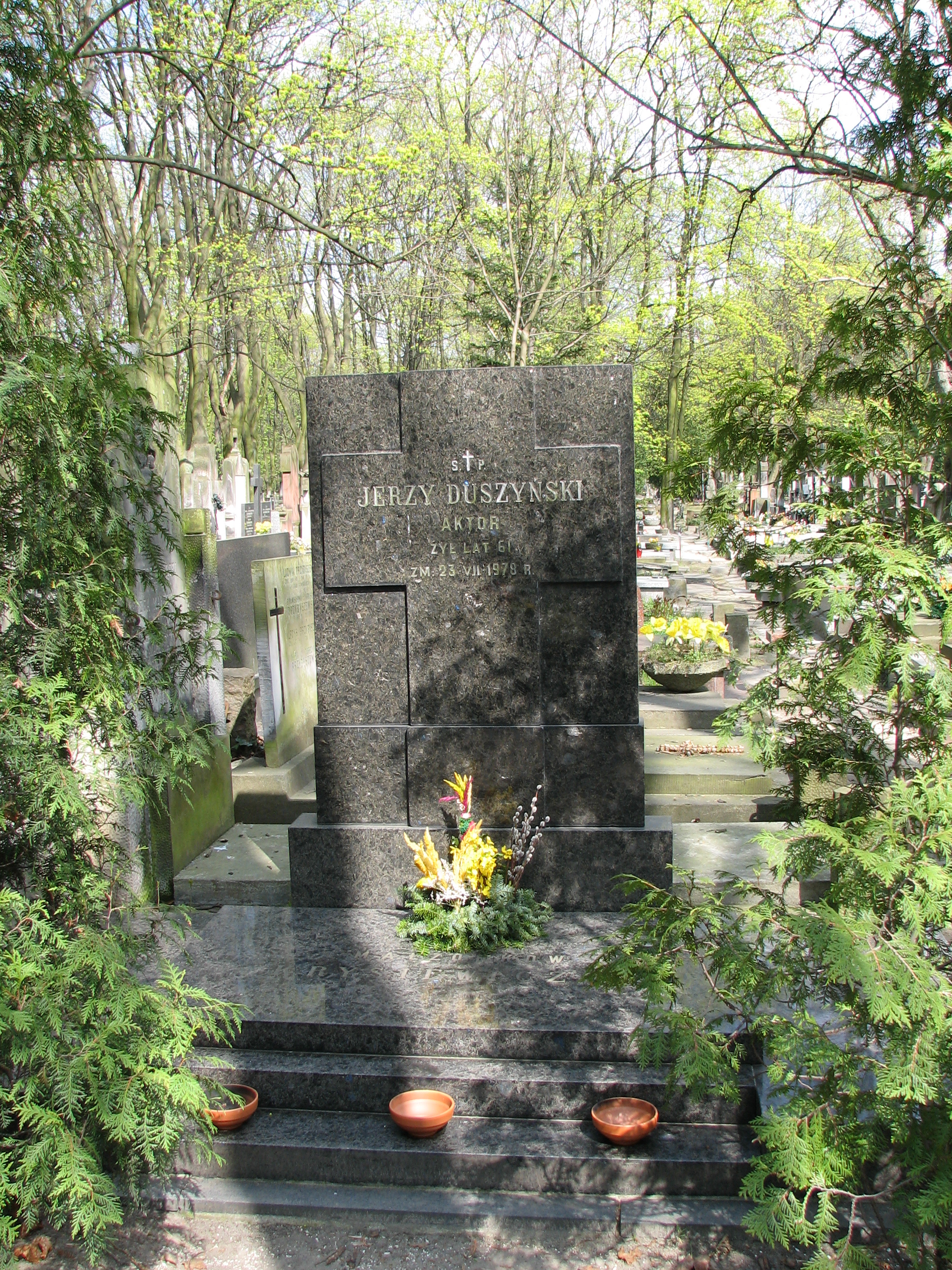
Jerzy Duszyński's tomb at the Warsaw Powązki Cemetery.

Jerzy Duszyński ([ˈjɛʐɨ duˈʂɨɲskʲi]; May 15, 1917–July 23, 1978) was one of the most popular actors in a post-war Poland. He starred in a number of film productions as well as theatrical plays.

== Biography ==
Duszyński was born in Moscow to the family of Feliks (a civil servant and state administration official, activist of the Polish Red Cross) and Maria Duszyński who were evacuated from Poland right before the offensive of the German Army during World War I. After the end of World War I, along with his parents he returned to Warsaw and then soon afterwards the family moved to Mińsk Mazowiecki, where he graduated in 1935 from I Gimnazjum Humanistyczne.

After finishing high school, he continued his education at the Municipal School of Arts and Decorative Painting in Warsaw (now the Academy of Fine Arts in Warsaw), where he studied for only one year. In 1936, he passed the entrance exam at the Theater Arts Department of the National Institute of Theatrical Arts, where he studied along with Hanka Bielicka and Danuta Szaflarska. He successfully completed his studies in June 1939.

His stage career began just before World War II, with a debut on 25 July 1939 in the role of the minister's cousin in ("Geneva") in Polish Theater in Warsaw and then in Wilno, where he performed between 1939–41 at Theater on Pohulanka together with Hanka Bielicka and Danuta Szaflarska. After Soviet troops entered the city, he played at Vilnius Polish Dramatic Theater. At the end of 1944 he moved with the theater's team to Białystok and by the end of 1944–45 season he performed in local theater. Between 1945–49 he was an actor of the Teatr Kameralny Wojska Polskiego of Łódź. Together with a team of theater (which changed its name to Współczesny) moved to Warsaw and performed in it until 1955. In the 1955–56 season and in the years 1958–60 he was an actor of Teatr Syrena, 1956–57 Teatr Narodowy, 1960–66 Teatr Ateneum, 1966–71 Teatr Klasyczny, 1971–78 Teatr Rozmaitości.

Jerzy Duszyński's film career was supposed to start in 1939 in Hania – a film directed by Józef Lejtes, for which the shooting began in summer of 1939, but – due to the outbreak of the war – the film was never completed.

After the war he played in two popular films:Skarb and Zakazane piosenki, that have made him the first male star of the post-war Polish cinema.

His last major film role was as Józef Piłsudski in Śmierć prezydenta directed by Jerzy Kawalerowicz in 1978.

He was awarded the Knight's Cross of the Order of Polonia Restituta (Krzyż Kawalerski Orderu Odrodzenia Polski) and the Gold Cross of Merit (Złoty Krzyż Zasługi).

== Family life ==
Jerzy Duszyński was married to actress Hanka Bielicka. Duszyński and Bielicka divorced in 1953.

In 1963 he married Helena Urbaniak, with whom he had only son: Marcin Duszyński.

== Death ==
Jerzy Duszyński died on 23 July 1978 in Warsaw as a result of lung cancer.

== Partial filmography ==
- Dwie godziny (1946, dir. Stanisław Wohl, Józef Wyszomirski) as Marek
- Zakazane piosenki (1946, dir. Leonard Buczkowski) as Roman Tokarski
- Skarb (1949, dir. Leonard Buczkowski) as Witek Konar
- Warsaw Premiere (1951, dir. Jan Rybkowski) as Wlodzimierz Wolski
- Młodość Chopina (1952, dir. Aleksander Ford) as Stefan Witwicki
- Żołnierz zwycięstwa (1953, dir. Wanda Jakubowska) as Henryk Liciński
- Domek z kart (1954, dir. Erwin Axer) as soldier
- Autobus odjeżdża 6.20 (1954, dir. Jan Rybkowski) as Wiktor Poradzki
- Černý prapor (1958, dir. Vladimír Čech) as Antek
- Awantura o Basię (1959, dir. Maria Kaniewska) as Stanisław Olszowski
- Cafe pod Minogą (1959, dir. Bronisław Brok) as journalist Andrzej Zagórski
- Mąż swojej żony (1961, dir. Stanisław Bareja) as Kurkiewicz
- Daleka jest droga (1963, dir. Bohdan Poręba) as Strzałka
- Panienka z okienka (1964, dir. Maria Kaniewska) as Denhof
- Przedświąteczny wieczór (1966, dir. Jerzy Stefan Stawiński) as doctor
- Dzieci z naszej szkoły (1968-1969, TV Series)
- Do przerwy 0:1 (1969, TV Series, dir. Stanisław Jędryka)
- Człowiek z M-3 (1969, dir. Leon Jeannot) as Clerk (uncredited)
- Paragon gola (1969, dir. Stanisław Jędryka) as journalist
- Jak rozpętałem drugą wojnę światową (1969, dir. Tadeusz Chmielewski) as Leonelli (uncredited)
- Hydrozagadka (1970, TV Movie, dir. Andrzej Kondratiuk) as Docent Frątczak;
- Gniewko, syn rybaka (1970, dir. Bohdan Poręba)
- Godzina szczytu (1973, dir. Jerzy Stefan Stawiński) as Professor
- Noce i dnie (1975, dir. Jerzy Antczak)
- Ocalić miasto (1976, dir. Jan Łomnicki) as Hans Frank
- Wielki układ (1976, dir. Andrzej Jerzy Piotrowski)
- Śmierć prezydenta (1977, dir. Jerzy Kawalerowicz) as Józef Piłsudski
- Układ krążenia (1977–1978, TV Series, dir. Andrzej Titkow)
- Indeks. Życie i twórczość Józefa M. (1977, dir. Janusz Kijowski) as uncle Karol
- Wakacje (1977, dir. Anette Olsen)
- Co mi zrobisz, jak mnie złapiesz? (1978, dir. Stanisław Bareja) as customer at the grocery store
- Doktor Murek (1978, dir. Witold Lesiewicz)

== Theatrical Plays ==
- Zielone lata, Claude A. Puget, premiere: 14 September 1939;
- Cieszmy się życiem, Moss Hart, George S. Kaufman, premiere: 3 November 1939;
- Pastorałka, Leon Schiller, premiere: 25 December 1939;
- Tessa, Margaret Kennedy, Basil Dean, premiere: 28 January 1940;
- Moralność pani Dulskiej, Gabriela Zapolska, premiere: 04.1940;
- Maria Stuart, Juliusz Słowacki, premiere: 1940;
- Ładna historia, Gaston A. de Caillavet, Robert de Flers, premiere: 7 July 1940;
- Zamiast komedii, teksty różnych autorów, premiere: 1 August 1940;
- Cyd, Pierre Corneille, premiere: 19 June 1941;
- Drzewa umierają stojąc, Alejandro Casona, premiere: unknown;
- Stara cegielnia, Jarosław Iwaszkiewicz, premiere: 1946;
- Spotkanie, Jean Anouilh, dir. Kazimierz Rudzki, premiere: 26 November 1946;
- Homer i Orchidea, Tadeusz Gajcy, dir. Sławomir Wyszomirski, premiere: 22 January 1947;
- Szklana menażeria, Tennessee Williams, dir. Erwin Axer, premiere: 1 March 1947;
- Amfitrion 38, Jean Giraudoux, dir. Erwin Axer, premiere: 18 September 1947;
- Joanna z Lotaryngii, Maxwell Anderson, dir. Erwin Axer, premiere: 25 June 1948;
- Niemcy, Leon Kruczkowski, dir. Erwin Axer, premiere: 5 November 1949;
- Trzydzieści srebrników, Howard Fast, dir. Erwin Axer, premiere: 30 April 1952;
- Droga z Czarnolasu, Aleksander Maliszewski, dir. Erwin Axer, premiere: 27 July 1952;
- Niemcy, Leon Kruczkowski, dir. Erwin Axer, premiere: 18 February 1955;
- Diabli nadali, mixed program, dir. Stanisława Perzanowska, premiere: 10 July 1955;
- Rym-cym-cym!, Julian Tuwim, dir. Adolf Dymsza, premiere: 9 June 1956;
- Madame Sans-Gene, Victorien Sardou, dir. Andrzej Łapicki, premiere: 15 November 1958;
- Maestro, J.Minkiewicz, A.Marianowicz, dir. K.Krukowski, premiere: 23 October 1959;
- Jim strzela pierwszy, Jiri Brdecki, dir. Stanisław Wohl, premiere: 23 December 1959;
- Ryszard III, William Shakespeare, dir. Jacek Woszczerowicz, premiere: 17 October 1960;
- Śmierć komiwojażera, Arthur Miller, dir. Janusz Warmiński, premiere: 26 November 1960;
- Męczeństwo z przymiarką, Ireneusz Iredyński, dir. Jan Bratkowski, premiere: 14 January 1961;
- Kram z piosenkami, Leon Schiller, dir. Barbara Fijewska, premiere: 25 February 1961;
- Krucjata, Krzysztof Choiński, dir. Jan Bratkowski, premiere: 24 March 1961;
- Andorra, Max Frisch, dir. Janusz Warmiński, premiere: 2 May 1962;
- Duże jasne, Jarosław Abramow-Newerly, dir. Jerzy Markuszewski, premiere: 19 October 1962;
- Demony, John Whiting, dir. Andrzej Wajda, premiere: 2 March 1963;
- Marie-Octobre, J.Robert, J.Duvivier, H.Jeanson, dir. Janusz Warmiński, premiere: 24 October 1963;
- Za rzekę w cień drzew, Ernest Hemingway, dir. Jacek Woszczerowicz, premiere: 28 January 1964;
- Madame Bovary, Gustav Flaubert, dir. Ireneusz Kanicki, premiere: 23 November 1966;
- Dziś do ciebie przyjść nie mogę, Ireneusz Kanicki, Lech Budrecki, dir. Ireneusz Kanicki, premiere: 12 March 1967;
- Cudzołóstwo ukarane, Janusz Głowacki, dir. Lech Hellwig-Górzyński, premiere: 14 May 1972;
- Hultaj, G. Gottesman, A.Jarecki, dir. Andrzej Ziembiński, premiere: 19 November 1972;
- Żaby, Arystofanes, dir. Giovanni Pampiglione, premiere: 16 February 1973;
- Nieuczesani, Czesław Czapów, dir. Ludwik Rene, premiere: 17 February 1974;
- Zajmij się Amelią, Georges Feydeau, dir. Józef Słotwiński, premiere: 21 June 1976;
- Sen, Felicja Kruszewska, dir. Jerzy Dobrowolski, premiere: 12 November 1976;
- Happy End, Dorothy Lane, dir. Olga Lipińska, premiere: 4 May 1977;
- Czworokąt, Edward Redliński, dir. Marek Kostrzewski, premiere: 4 May 1977;
- Dyl Sowizdrzał, Grigorij Gorin, dir. Wojciech Pokora, premiere: 8 April 1978.
