= Kargul and Pawlak Museum =

Museum in Lubomierz, Poland

Coordinates: 51°00′47″N 15°30′37″E

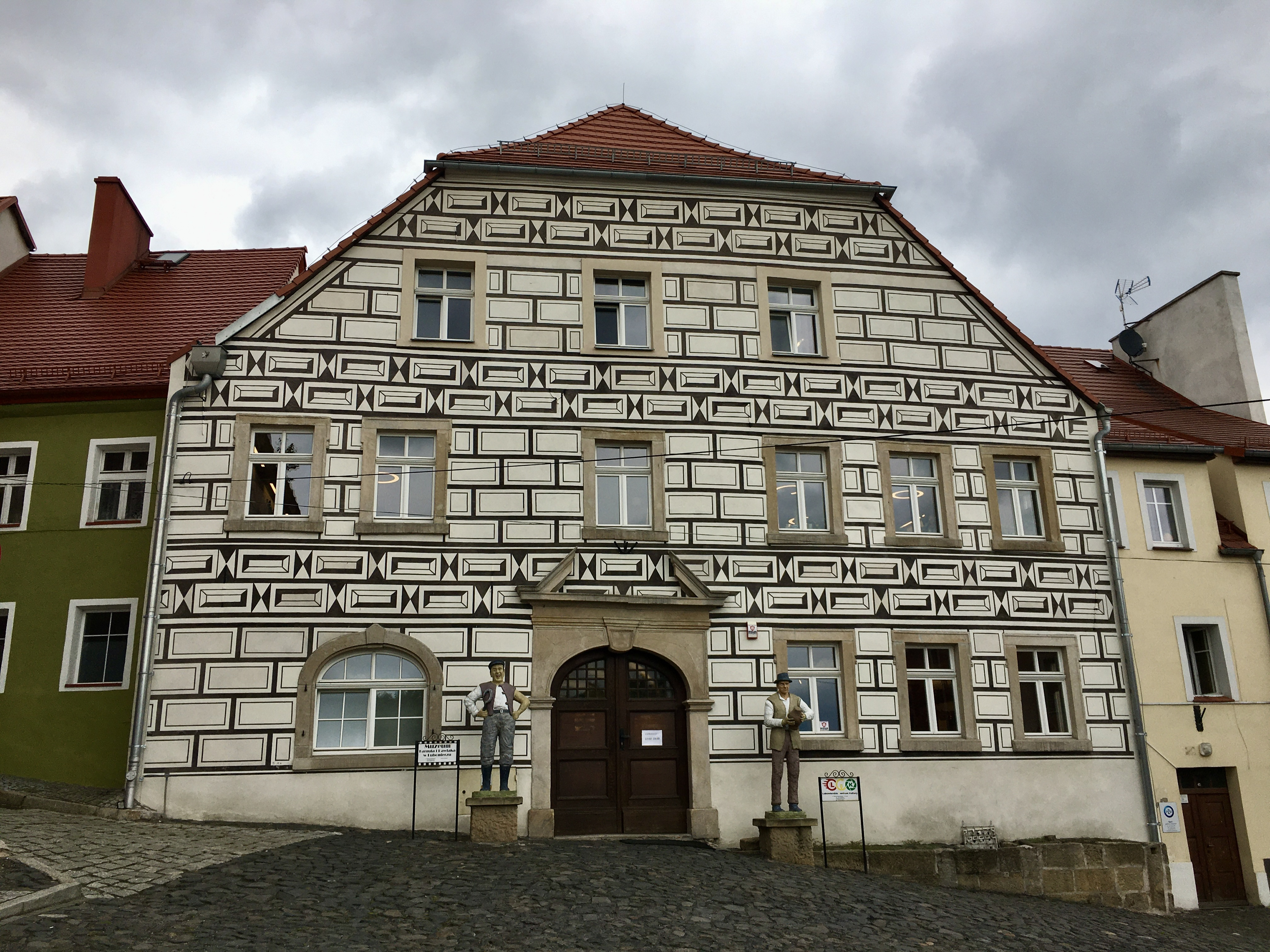
Kargul and Pawlak Museum

The Kargul and Pawlak Museum is a museum located in Lubomierz, Poland, at 1 Wacława Kowalskiego St. It is located in the former House of the Linen Makers, a building dating from the 16th century.

== Description ==
In 1992, the first issue of the local newspaper Sami Swoi was published in Lubomierz, and the editors began collecting memorabilia related to the town's cinematic past. The museum was established in 1995 on the initiative of the town's residents, with support of the mayor.

The museum is located in the vicinity of the market square, a place featured several times in the film Sami swoi. The museum is situated on the first floor of one of the oldest buildings in town, the so-called Linen Makers' House, which has been the seat of the Linen Makers' Guild since the 16th century.

There is a" Film Alley" in front of the museum, which formally is not part of the museum, but constitutes an extension of the exhibition. The alley features commemorative plaques dedicated to people connected not only with the film Sami swoi, but also with other film productions made in Lubomierz. Two statues of the main characters were placed in front of the entrance to the museum: Władysław Kargul and Kazimierz Pawlak, as well as a signpost with directions and distances to important cities in the world, including Hollywood.

== Collection ==
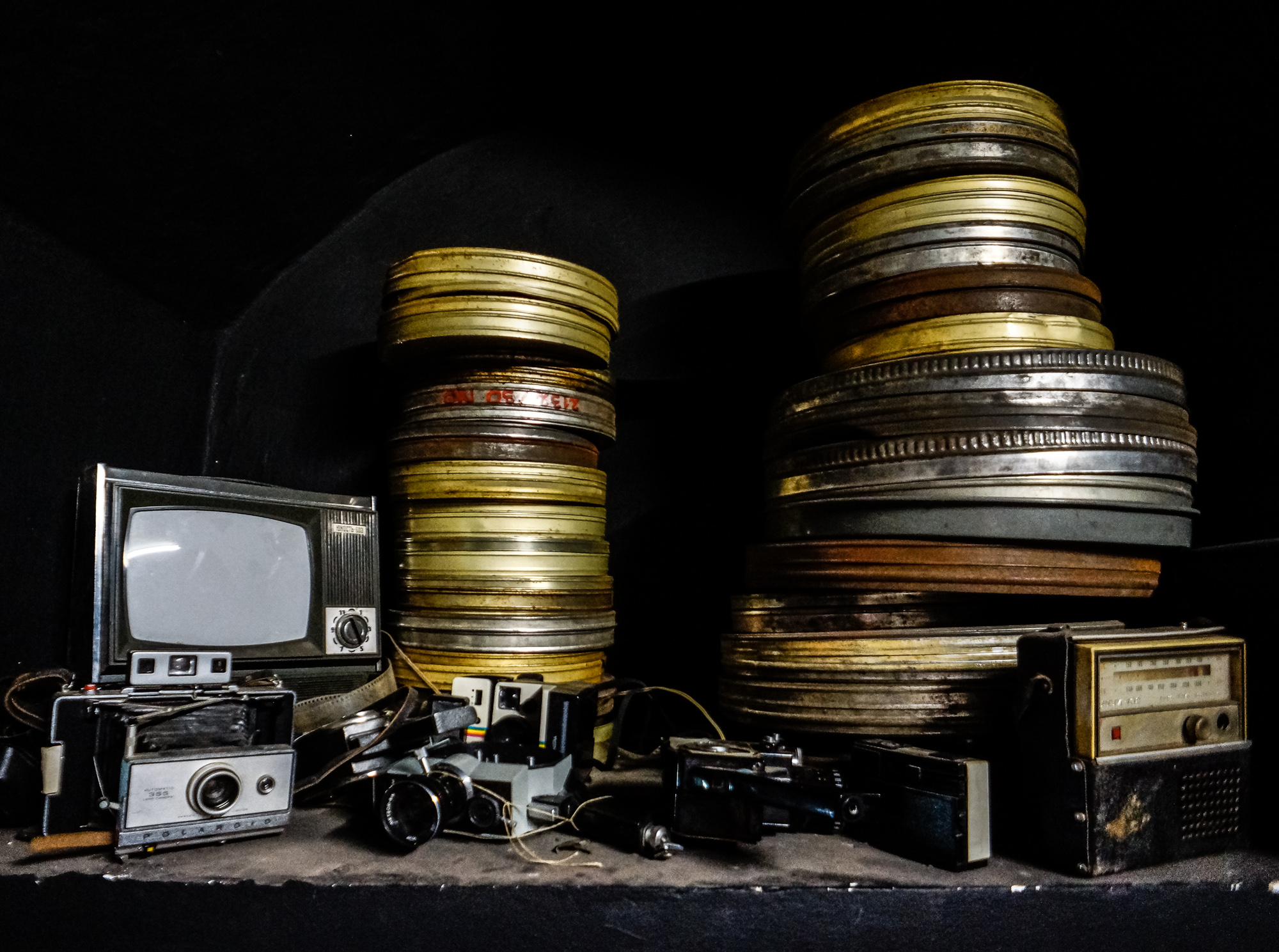
Film exhibits in the museum

The Kargul and Pawlak Museum collects various memorabilia related to Sylwester Chęciński's classic comedy, primarily props used during the shooting of the film. These include a rifle with a loose lock, a grenade for a festive outfit, and a fragment of the fence at which the protagonists argued. Other unique exhibits include the contract with Władysław Hańcza's double, Józef Jakubowski, and the first copy of Sami swoi, which was used to screen the film during its 1967 world premiere.
