= Krzysztof Osiecki =

Polish film editor (1934–2009)

- Born: February 1, 1934
- Died: February 28, 2009 (aged 75); Wrocław, Poland
- Occupation: Film editor
- Years active: 1959–2001

Krzysztof Osiecki (1 February 1934 – 28 February 2009) was a Polish film editor with over 60 credits. Working primarily with the Wrocław Feature Film Studio, he is best known for editing Andrzej Żuławski's films The Devil (1972) and On the Silver Globe (1988), as well as comedies by Sylwester Chęciński.

He began working in Polish cinema in the late 1950s. His earliest credited work was as a sound collaborator on the 1959 production One Room Tenants (released in 1960). In the 1960s he served mainly as an assistant editor for assemblies of feature films and television series before becoming a main editor in 1969. His final credit was for Louder Than Bombs (2001). He died in Wrocław at age 75.

== Filmography ==
=== As editor ===
Feature films

- Znaki na drodze (1969)
- Tylko umarły odpowie (1969)
- Legend (1970)
- Kto wierzy w bociany? (1970)
- Szerokiej drogi, kochanie (1971)
- Z tamtej strony tęczy (1972)
- Opętanie (1972)
- The Devil (1972)
- Zasieki (1973)
- To ja zabiłem (1974)
- Nie ma mocnych (1974)
- Partita na instrument drewniany (1975)
- Moja wojna, moja miłość (1975)
- Wielki układ (1976)
- Love or Leave (1977)
- Roman i Magda (1978)
- Próba ognia i wody (1978)
- Pełnia (1979)
- Elegia (1979)
- Przed odlotem (1980)
- Wielka majówka (1981)
- On, ona, oni (1981)
- Wielki Szu (1982)
- Noc poślubna w biały dzień (1982)
- Szkoda twoich łez (1983)
- Sny i marzenia (1983)
- W zawieszeniu (1986)
- Legend of the White Horse (1986)
- Cyrk odjeżdża (1987)
- On the Silver Globe (1988)
- Ostatni prom (1989)
- Konsul (1989)
- Rozmowy kontrolowane (1991)
- Zwolnieni z życia (1992)
- Piękna nieznajoma (1992)
- Krugerandy (1999)
- Louder Than Bombs (2001)

Television films and specials

- Dom Pirków (1998, TV film)
- Liceum czarnej magii (1998, TV film)
- Baśń o Pączkowej (1996, TV film)
- Gorący czwartek (1993, TV film)
- Szklany dom (1989, TV film)
- Pusta klatka (1987, TV film)
- Zabijanie koni (1982, TV film)
- Chłopiec (1981, TV film)
- Bo oszalałem dla niej (1980, TV film)
- Słodkie oczy (1979, TV film)
- Koty to dranie (1978, TV film)
- Długa noc poślubna (1976, TV film)
- Kradzież (1976, TV film)
- Wyjazd służbowy (1975, TV film)
- Żelazna obroża (1975, TV film)
- Aktorka (1971, TV film)
- Diament radży (1971, TV film)
- Nos (1971, TV film)
- Pierwsza miłość (1971, TV film)
- Co jest w człowieku w środku (1969, TV film)
- Dziękuję za służbę (1997, TV play)
- Trapez (1984, TV series)
- Trzy młyny (1984, TV series)
- Droga (1973, TV series)

Documentaries

- Dzieci z trójkąta (1995)
- Modlitwa (1990)
- Jestem mężczyzną (1985)

=== Other credits ===
- One Room Tenants (1959) – sound collaborator

As assistant editor:

- Lalka (1968)
- Długa noc (1967)
- Sami swoi (1967)
- Skok (1967)
- Czterej pancerni i pies (1966–; early episodes)
- Rachunek sumienia (1964)
- Rękopis znaleziony w Saragossie (1964)
- Dwa żebra Adama (1963)
- Ubranie prawie nowe (1963)
- Przeciwko bogom (1961)
- Tarpany (1961)
