= Długa noc =

1967 Polish war film (released in 1989)

- Directed by: Janusz Nasfeter
- Written by: Janusz Nasfeter
- Based on: Wiesław Rogowski's novel Noc
- Produced by: Marceli Nowak
- Starring: Anna Ciepielewska; Ryszarda Hanin
- Cinematography: Antoni Nurzyński
- Edited by: Roman Kolski
- Production company: Studio Film Unit
- Release date: October 30, 1989 (Poland)
- Running time: 78 min
- Country: Poland
- Language: Polish

Długa noc (English: The Long Night) is a Polish war film from 1967, directed by Janusz Nasfeter, based on the novel Noc by Wiesław Rogowski. The plot revolves around the dilemmas faced by the residents of a certain house in occupied Poland during World War II, where one of the inhabitants is revealed to be a collaborator with a partisan unit and a person hiding a Jew. Długa noc was one of the earliest "shelf films" – movies whose distribution was prevented by censorship during the communist regime. Created in an atmosphere of anti-Semitic sentiments, Nasfeter's film was not allowed to be shown until 1989.

== Plot ==
The action of the film takes place during the German occupation of Poland during World War II, in 1943, over a single day. The owner of a certain house, Mrs. Piekarczyk, mourns the sudden death of her husband, whose coffin is soon to be taken out. Her daughter Marta, who secretly loves a tenant named Korsak, supports her grief. Also living in the house is Katarzyna, a married woman with one child; her husband has been taken away by the Nazis. Under the pretext of offering help, her brother-in-law Józef Katjan visits her regularly. Unexpectedly, a curfew is announced in the town from six in the evening until noon the next day – right when Korsak plans to deliver weapons to the partisans. While riding in a carriage, Korsak unsuccessfully tries to convince Katjan to bypass the blockades set up by the gendarmes, which leads to a fight between them. Eventually, they both return home and upon their return, Korsak tells Katjan to lie to the rest of the household, saying the fight was about Katarzyna.

While Korsak goes upstairs, Marta and Katarzyna discover that Korsak has been hiding a Jew in his room. The accidental discovery of the fugitive provokes a heated argument among the residents. Katjan and Mrs. Piekarczyk lean towards turning the newcomer in, while Marta and Katarzyna refuse to allow this. Before the residents can agree on what to do with the Jew, he escapes with Korsak under the cover of night into the forest. The news of the unwanted guest's disappearance does not calm the household. Mrs. Piekarczyk searches the mattress where the Jew was hiding, looking for gold. Meanwhile, Katjan rapes Katarzyna. Humiliated, Katarzyna returns to Marta and asks her to turn off the lamp. Marta, guessing what has happened, breaks down in tears.

== Cast ==
- Anna Ciepielewska – Katarzyna Katjanowa
- Ryszarda Hanin – Mrs. Piekarczykowa
- Jolanta Wołłejko – Marta, daughter of Mrs. Piekarczykowa
- Józef Duriasz – Zygmunt Korsak
- Ludwik Pak – Józef Katjan, brother-in-law of Katarzyna
- Zygmunt Hobot – Jew
- Henryk Hunko – Szymański, employer of Korsak
- Zdzisław Maklakiewicz – Antoszka
- Halina Buyno-Łoza – Szymańska
- Krystyna Feldman – a woman with a broken watch
- Irena Netto – Dalecka
- Ryszard Pietruski – policeman Wasiak

== Production ==
=== Preparatory work ===
In 1961, Wydawnictwo Lubelskie published Wiesław Rogowski's debut novel Noc, set in Lubelszczyzna. Rogowski described anti-Semitic acts among Poles in the provinces long before the books of Jan Tomasz Gross, noting the exploitation of Jews in need of help, robbing them, and ruthlessly getting rid of the problem by denying them shelter, murdering them, or handing them over to the Germans. In the late 1960s, director Janusz Nasfeter became interested in Noc on the advice of Jerzy Niemianowski and Aleksander Ford.

Nasfeter personally wrote the screenplay based on Rogowski's book in the summer of 1966. Cautiously, he removed the subplot of the Jew Jakub’s wandering after escaping from the Lublin Ghetto, shifted the time of the action to winter, and limited it to a few hours. While the Jew was the central figure in the novel, Nasfeter made him merely a catalyst for the tumultuous events in the provincial house. Joanna Preizner argued years later that these changes were necessary to begin work on the film:

Nasfeter was fully aware that the text, to be approved for production, could not contain scenes like those described by Rogowski. Not wanting to replace them with others or create a softened version of the Jewish refugee's fate, he decided not to show them at all.

On 28 October 1966, the Script Evaluation Committee positively reviewed Nasfeter's screenplay and unanimously decided to greenlight the Długa noc project.

=== Production ===
Długa noc was produced by the Studio Film Unit under the artistic direction of Aleksander Ford, at the Film Studio in Wrocław. Marceli Nowak was the film’s production manager. Cinematography was handled by Antoni Nurzyński, who primarily used close-ups of the characters' faces for dramatic effect. The location chosen for Długa noc was Wyszogród, near Warsaw. Due to weather conditions, not only the cast but also the crew members wore fur coats. In her production report for Film magazine, Krystyna Garbień noted that the crew had good film stock and good equipment. The set design was done by Jerzy Skrzepiński, and the costumes were made by Jolanta Komorowska. Roman Kolski edited the recorded material.

=== Review and ban on distribution ===
The review of Długa noc took place a few days after the outbreak of the Six-Day War, during which the Eastern Bloc countries supported the Arab aggressors against Israeli forces. The reaction of the Polish People's Republic's authorities was dictated by the Soviet Union, and anti-Semitic sentiments were stoked from the top. During the review, commentators were outraged by a scene in which Katarzyna discovers the Jew hiding behind a curtain and exclaims in horror, He's hiding a Jew. He will bring death upon us. Deputy Minister of Culture and Art Tadeusz Zaorski, closing the review, did not accept the film's message and opined that there are far more Poles who gave their lives to save Jews than those who handed them over. The final sequence, culminating in the rape of Katarzyna, further worsened the situation. Zaorski dismissed her traumatic experience as pushing the film into the realm of internal feelings.

Although the film was initially planned to be released, media interest in Długa noc gradually waned. It became clear that the film would never be shown during the communist era. From a list of films banned by the authorities, it was evident that Długa noc was one of the top-priority films to be banned, right after The Devil (1972) by Andrzej Żuławski and Ręce do góry (1968) by Jerzy Skolimowski. It was not until 30 October 1989 during Poland's political transformation, that Długa noc premiered at the Łódź House of Culture.

In a 1992 interview with Gazeta Wyborcza, Nasfeter claimed that he considered Długa noc his most outstanding work, as well as the most personal of his career:

In all my films, I sought the truth about people. I wanted to understand their motivations. In 'Długa noc', where I depicted Poles and Jews, I did not seek out exceptional attitudes. Extreme in their cruelty or kindness. Some were heroes, others were driven by fear. Now I think that the essence of humanity is really the instinct for self-preservation. There are exceptions to this. Just like in mathematics. Where do they come from? That is a matter for God, or perhaps genetics...

== Significance ==
Długa noc is regarded as the second longest-censored full-length film in the history of Polish People's Republic cinematography, following Aleksander Ford's The Eighth Day of the Week (1958). As early as 1992, it was dubbed the last "shelf film" of the 1945–1989 period by Katarzyna Bielas from Gazeta Wyborcza. However, this title eventually went to Jacek Butrymowicz's Kwiat paproci (1972), which was discovered in 2009.

Despite its historical significance, Długa noc did not achieve the popularity of many other Polish "shelf films" and was largely forgotten by both audiences and critics. Aránzazu Calderón Puerta and Tomasz Żukowski noted that the film's neglect was partly due to its sensitive subject matter of anti-Semitism in Poland:

The reception history of "Długa noc" and "Przy torze kolejowym" (Note: A short film by Andrzej Brzozowski from 1963 also addressed the theme of Polish anti-Semitism through the tragic fate of a Jewish woman who escaped from a transport to Auschwitz. It premiered on television only in 1992.) – or rather the lack thereof – seems particularly significant given that so much attention has been devoted to the so-called 'shelf films' since the early 1990s.

Paweł Jaskulski described Długa noc as a missed opportunity for Polish cinema, and certainly the biggest missed opportunity in Janusz Nasfeter's career, previously known exclusively for his youth films. Jaskulski argued that Długa noc deserves to be restored to its rightful place in the history of Polish cinema, especially in the context of much later films like Władysław Pasikowski's Aftermath (2011) and Paweł Pawlikowski's Ida (2013).

== Bibliography ==
- Jaskulski, P. (2021). Niewygodna zagadka: twórczość Janusza Nesfetera (in Polish). Warsaw: Dom Wydawniczy Elipsa. ISBN 978-83-8017-399-6.
- Kurz, I. (2008). ""Ten obraz jest trochę straszliwy". Historia pewnego filmu, czyli naród polski twarzą w twarz z Żydem". Zagłada Żydów. Studia i Materiały (in Polish). 4.
- Preizner, Joanna (2012). Kamienie na macewie: Holokaust w polskim kinie (in Polish). Kraków: Wydawnictwo Austeria. ISBN 978-83-61978-92-3.
