= Axer =

Axer may refer to:

- Aleksander Axer (1880–1948), Polish mathematician
- Erwin Axer (1917–2012), Polish theatre director, writer and university professor
- Axer (Transformers), a fictional character from the Transformers universe
- Axer, Italian singer and songwriter
