= Szczęśliwego Nowego Jorku =

1997 film by Janusz Zaorski

- Directed by: Janusz Zaorski
- Written by: Edward Redliński
- Starring: Bogusław Linda, Zbigniew Zamachowski, Janusz Gajos, Cezary Pazura and Katarzyna Figura
- Cinematography: Paweł Edelman
- Music by: Marek Kościkiewicz
- Release date: 1997
- Country: Poland
- Language: Polish

Szczęśliwego Nowego Jorku (lit. 'Happy New York', also titled as 'Merry Christmas and a Happy New York') is a 1997 Polish comedy film directed by Janusz Zaorski. It is a film about six Polish immigrants in New York City unsuccessfully trying to cope with the realities of New York.

The film was inspired by the novel Szczuropolacy (lit. 'Rat-Poles') of Polish writer Edward Redliński, who also adapted it into a drama Cud na Greenpoincie ('Miracle in Greenpoint').

It was a box office hit in Poland and has been described as one of Zaorski's best known films.

== Background ==
In 1984, during the era of martial law in communist Poland, Polish writer Edward Redliński left the country for the United States for six weeks, to collect material for the completion of his series Konopielka – Awans – Bazar. He ultimately spent seven years there. His observation of Polish immigrants betrayed by the myth of the American Dream inspired him to write the novel Szczuropolacy. Later he adapted it to a drama, Cud na Greenpoincie, staged in New York and some other American cities. Redliński continued the subject of Poles in America in the collection Bumtarara, which may be seen as an expansion of the story from Szczuropolacy.

Many in the American Polish community criticized the author for the unpleasant portrayal, even "defamation", of Polish Americans, although a decade later the book inspired the Polish filmmaker Janusz Zaorski to make a comedy, which became popular in Poland.

== Plot ==
The main characters of the film are six Polish immigrants in New York who come from various backgrounds in their homeland. The story covers four Sundays in December and culminates on Christmas Eve.

The film includes story lines for each main character.

Detachment from traditions and cultural roots, and unfamiliarity with the language and realities of New York life, lead the characters to become estranged from American society, and disillusioned with it. Nevertheless, they send home videos back home to Poland that paint a rosy picture of their lives.

== Reception ==
The movie was successful in the Polish box office, with over 500,000 viewers—in an interview, Zaorski stated 700,000 people saw it in the cinema—and it has also been discussed by several Polish movie critics. The critics, offering mixed reviews, also noted that the movie, marketed as a comedy, is in fact a tragicomedy, and an existential drama. While the movie stars some of the most famous contemporary Polish actors like Cezary Pazura, Bogusław Linda, Janusz Gajos, Katarzyna Figura, Zbigniew Zamachowski and Rafał Olbrychski, some critics suggested that it might have been better if different, perhaps less famous actors, were cast in the lead roles.

A review at Variety suggested that the film would have few commercial prospects beyond Polish communities.

The movie has also been discussed in literature on Polish film studies as one of the most successful examples of the Polish "demythologization of the West", dispelling the myths about the American Dream for Polish immigrants. It also criticizes the Polish myth of Poles as successful immigrants. The movie is critical of both Poland and the United States. Polish scholar Dariusz Baran described the movie as one of the most "important political and social Polish cinematic analys[es]" of the 1990s, with the movie itself providing a truthful descriptions of the problems of Polish immigration.

== Soundtrack ==
The soundtrack for the movie included works of artists such as One, Two, Three and Artur Gadowski. In 1998 the soundtrack album reached number 19 on the Polish chart Lista Przebojów Programu Trzeciego.

== Cast ==
- Bogusław Linda – Janek („Andrew”, „Serfer”, „Lawyer”)
- Zbigniew Zamachowski – Ignacy („Potejto”)
- Cezary Pazura – Leszek („Azbest”)
- Katarzyna Figura – Teresa („Teriza”), sister of „Azbest”
- Rafał Olbrychski – Jacek „Pank”, brother of „Serfer”
- Janusz Gajos – „Profesor”
- Danuta Stenka – wife of „Profesor”
- Liliana Okowity – wife of „Serfer”
- Eugeniusz Priwieziencew – pimp „Czemp”
- Katarzyna Szydłowska – prostitute, „daughter” of „Czemp”
- Zygmunt Hobot – millioner „Riczi”
- Sławomir Pacek – Henio, fiance of Teresa
- Dorota Dobrowolska-Ferenc – Jadzia, wife of Ignacy
- Dorota Chotecka – wife of „Azbest”
- Małgorzata Rożniatowska – mother of „Azbest”
- Andrzej Wasilewicz – „client” with loppers

== See also ==
- History of Poles in the United States
