= How I Unleashed World War II =

1970 film by Tadeusz Chmielewski

- Polish DVD cover
- Directed by: Tadeusz Chmielewski
- Screenplay by: Tadeusz Chmielewski
- Based on: The Adventures of Dolas the Cannoneer by Kazimierz Sławiński
- Produced by: Ludgierd Romanis
- Starring: Marian Kociniak
- Cinematography: Jerzy Stawicki
- Edited by: Janina Niedźwiecka
- Music by: Jerzy Matuszkiewicz
- Production company: Zespoły Filmowe
- Release dates: 1969 (screening): 2 April 1970
- Running time: 224 minutes
- Country: Poland
- Languages: Polish; German; Serbo-Croat; Greek; English; French; Italian; Russian

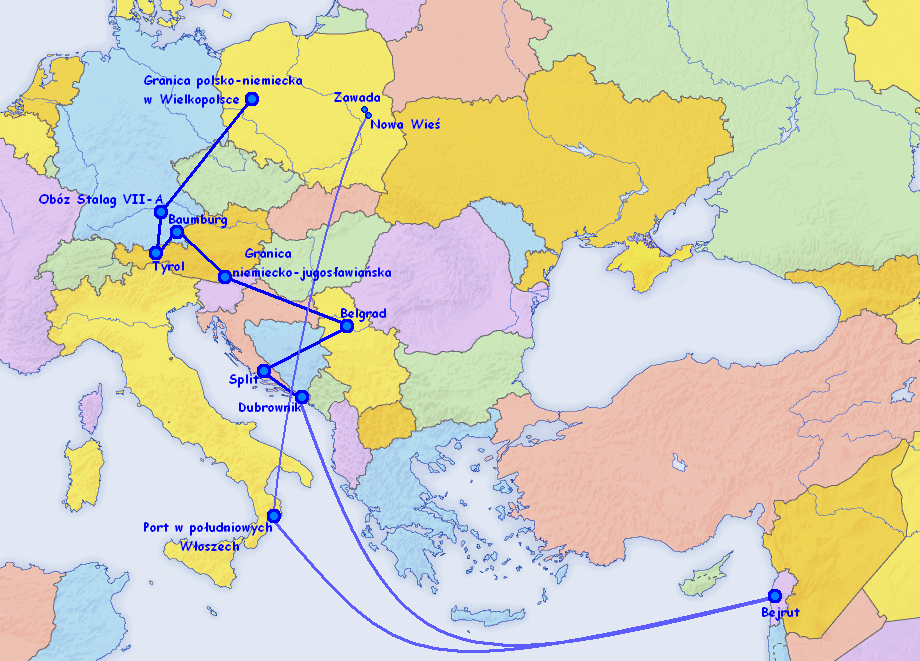
Franek Dolas' route

How I Unleashed World War II (Polish: Jak rozpętałem drugą wojnę światową) is a 1970 Polish comedy film directed by Tadeusz Chmielewski and based on the novel Przygody kanoniera Dolasa (The Adventures of Dolas the Cannoneer) by Kazimierz Sławiński, a Polish war pilot who survived a German POW camp. It was shot in Sochi, Baku, Poświętne and Łódź, among other places.

== Synopsis ==
The film was divided into three parts:

- Część I: Ucieczka (Part I: The Escape)
- Część II: Za bronią (Part II: Following the Arms)
- Część III: Wśród swoich (Part III: Among Friends)

The film tells the story of a Polish soldier Franciszek (Franek) Dolas, who—as a result of comical coincidences—is convinced that he started the Second World War. Trying to redeem himself at all costs, he constantly gets into new trouble. In doing so, he finds himself on different war fronts (Yugoslavia, Mediterranean Sea, Middle East, Italy) and eventually returns to Poland.

In a particularly famous scene, Dolas is questioned by a German-speaking Gestapo officer in Austria and answers that his name is "Grzegorz Brzęczyszczykiewicz"; the officer gets increasingly frustrated trying to write the fictitious Polish name.

Originally filmed in black and white, it was digitally colorized in 2001 by the Hollywood company Dynacs Digital Studios, as requested by the Studio Filmowe "Oko" and TV Polsat.

== Cast ==
- Marian Kociniak – Franek Dolas
- Wirgiliusz Gryń – Józek Kryska
- Leonard Pietraszak – airman in stalag
- Stanisław Milski – German general
- Kazimierz Talarczyk – Woydyłło
- Jerzy Block – stationmaster
- Andrzej Gawroński – Helmut, Gestapo man
- Emil Karewicz – Gestapo officer
- Henryk Łapiński – Władzio Wachocki
- Andrzej Herder – Hans, Gestapo man
- Leon Pietraszkiewicz – Herbert Gulke
- Jerzy Rogalski – Jędrzej Grzyb, peasant
- Mirosław Szonert – gendarme
- Mieczysław Stoor – Gestapo man
- Jarosław Skulski – colonel in the Polish embassy in Belgrade
- Tomasz Zaliwski – Yugoslav officer
- Elżbieta Starostecka – singer in the inn
- Jerzy Moes – lieutenant Regulski
- Andrzej Krasicki – French ship's captain
- Wojciech Zagórski – the Turk enrolling on the German ship
- Janina Borońska – Elżbieta
- Ludwik Benoit – innkeeper
- Janusz Kłosiński – innkeeper
- Jan Paweł Kruk – sailor
- Zdzisław Kuźniar – Dino Stojadinović (Yugoslav ship's captain)
- Józef Łodyński – stoker on the Yugoslav ship
- Krystyna Borowicz – the brothel owner
- Piotr Fronczewski – Italian soldier
- Wacław Kowalski – Kiedros, sergeant in French Foreign Legion
- Jan Świderski – Letoux, captain in Foreign Legion
- Leonard Andrzejewski – soldier in Foreign Legion
- Kazimierz Rudzki – captain Ralf Peacoock
- Lech Ordon – sergeant Hopkins
- Zdzisław Maklakiewicz – Italian soldier
- Jerzy Duszyński – Italian soldier
- Marian Rułka – British soldier
- Joanna Jędryka – Teresa
- Małgorzata Pritulak – Mirella
- Kazimierz Fabisiak – father Dominik, prior in a monastery
- Konrad Morawski – Matula
- Zygmunt Zintel – father Sebastian
- Halina Buyno-Łoza – Jóźwiakowa
- Stanisław Gronkowski – partisan "Wilk" (Wolf)
- Aleksander Fogiel – Jóźwiak
- Eugeniusz Kamiński – Gestapo man
- Ludwik Kasendra – brother Florian
