= Andrzej Mularczyk =

Polish writer and reporter (1930–2024)

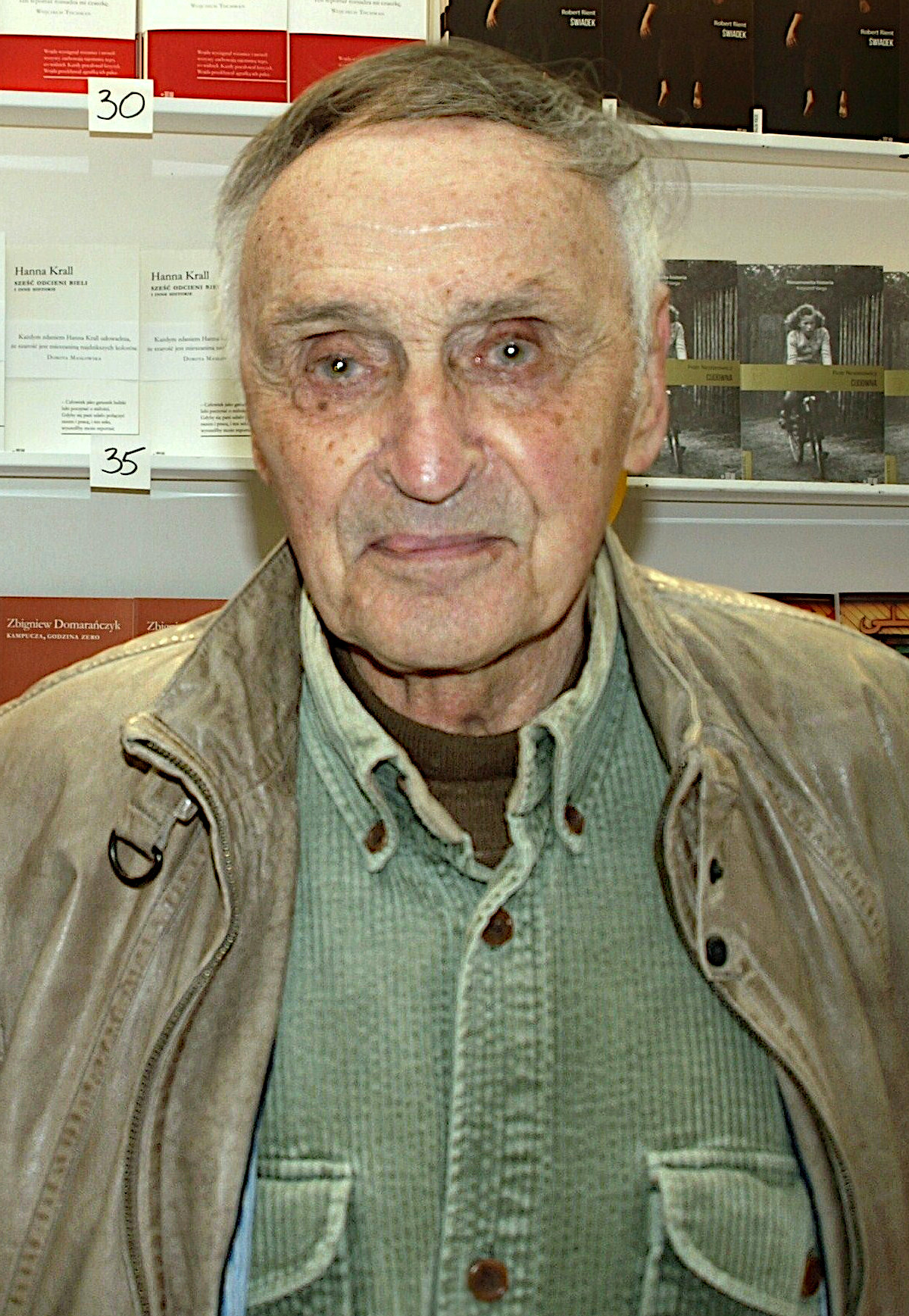
- Mularczyk at the Warsaw Book Fair in 2015
- Born: 13 June 1930; Warsaw, Poland
- Died: 21 June 2024 (aged 94)
- Education: University of Warsaw
- Years active: 1943–2024

Andrzej Edward Mularczyk (13 June 1930 – 21 June 2024) was a Polish writer, screenwriter, reporter, and author of radio dramas.

== Biography ==
Mularczyk was born on 13 June 1930. His brother was the Polish writer Roman Bratny.

He made his literary debut in 1943 in the conspiratorial publication Dźwigary, which published his work (anonymously). After the war, in 1949 he began to work as a journalist at the same time as he was pursuing studies in the Journalism Department of the University of Warsaw. He completed his studies in 1955. He worked as a reporter and columnist for the weekly publication "Świat". He was a member of the Związek Literatów Polskich from 1955 and of the Stowarzyszenie Filmowców Polskich from 1964.

In 1970–1977 he worked as literary director in the film group Iluzjon, and also worked for Polish Radio for many years.

Many films have been based on his screenplays, including some that are very widely known in Poland such as the series Sami swoi, Nie ma mocnych, Kochaj albo rzuć, and the television serial Dom. He wrote a total of around 40 screenplays. He was the author of the film story Post mortem. Katyń, released in 2007, which served as the basis for Andrzej Wajda’s film Katyń about the Katyn massacre.

Under the pseudonym Andrzej Jurek he co-authored the screenplay for the film Liczę na wasze grzechy, together with Jerzy Janicki.

Mularczyk died on 21 June 2024, at the age of 94.

== Selected films ==
=== Screenplay ===
- 1958: Miasteczko
- 1964: Przerwany lot
- 1966: Ktokolwiek wie...
- 1967: Sami swoi
- 1967: Julia, Anna, Genowefa...
- 1971: Jeszcze słychać śpiew i rżenie koni...
- 1971: Na przełaj
- 1973: Sobie król
- 1973: Droga
- 1974: Nie ma mocnych
- 1974: Cień tamtej wiosny
- 1974: Głowy pełne gwiazd
- 1975: Niespotykanie spokojny człowiek
- 1976: Ostatnie takie trio
- 1977: Kochaj albo rzuć
- 1978: Rodzina Połanieckich
- 1978: Wielki podryw
- 1980-2000: Dom
- 1982: Wyjście awaryjne
- 1982: Jest mi lekko
- 1983: Marynia
- 1986: Rykowisko
- 1988: Pięć minut przed gwizdkiem
- 1988: Cesarskie cięcie
- 1989: Goryl, czyli ostatnie zadanie...
- 1994: Jest jak jest
- 1999: Wrota Europy
- 2004: Cudownie ocalony
- 2007: Katyń - together with Andrzej Wajda
- 2016: Afterimage

== Awards and distinctions ==
- 1989 – Prix Italia in the category "Fiction" for radio dramas (screenplay) Z głębokości wód
- 1996 – Prix Italia in the category "Fiction" for radio dramas (screenplay) Cyrk odjechał, lwy zostały
- 2005 – Diamentowy Mikrofon [Diamond Microphone]
