= Little Moscow (film) =

- Polish: Mała Moskwa
- Directed by: Waldemar Krzystek
- Starring: Svetlana Khodchenkova; Lesław Żurek; Dmitry Ulyanov
- Release date: 28 November 2008
- Running time: 114 minutes
- Country: Poland
- Languages: Polish; Russian

Little Moscow (Polish: Mała Moskwa) is a Polish-Russian co-production directed by Waldemar Krzystek and released in 2008.

== Plot ==
It is 1967, the middle of the Cold War in Legnica, south western Poland. The Red Army have turned the town into the largest Soviet garrison on foreign soil due to Legnica's proximity to Czechoslovakia and East Germany. Vera is married to the crack Soviet pilot Yura, but after attending a cultural event to ease Polish-Soviet tensions falls head over heels in love with Michał, a Polish officer. The forbidden love takes many twists and turns, and the tale begins and ends in post-Soviet Legnica in 2008 as both Yura and his angry daughter Vera Junior try to make peace with the past.

== Cast ==
- Svetlana Khodchenkova as Vera Svetlova
- Lesław Żurek as Michał Janicki
- Dmitry Ulyanov as Yura Svetlov, Vera's husband
- Weronika Książkiewicz
- Artyom Tkachenko as Sayat

== Awards ==
At the 33rd annual Polish Film Festival in 2008 the category of best actress was won by Svetlana Khodchenkova and Golden Lion by director Waldemar Krzystek.
