= Kazimierz Talarczyk =

Polish film and theatre actor

Kazimierz Talarczyk (2 February 1920 in Poznań – 6 May 1972 in Kłodzko) was a Polish film and theatre actor.

He played at the Theatre Actor and Dolls in Poznań from 1948 to 1949, and touring the Drama Theatre of the Polish Army in Warsaw (1949 to 1950), the Polish Theatre in Poznań (1950 to 1953), the Coastal Theatre in Gdańsk (1953 to 1961, and 1962 to 1966), Powszechny Theatre in Warsaw (1961, and 1966 to 1967) and the Stefan Jaracz Theatre in Łódź (1967 to 1972). He was the father of actor Roman Talarczyk. He died in 1972, and his grave is located in the parish cemetery in Wolsztyn.

== Filmography ==
- Chłopi – a resident of Lipiec
- Czterej pancerni i pies – major Rosomaka
- How I Unleashed World War II – Woydyłło
- Przygody pana Michała – Noble
- Sami swoi – Antoni Wieczorek
- Stawka większa niż życie – Wehrmacht commander
- Gdzie jest generał... – Russian colonel
- Na białym szlaku (1962)
