= Bronisław Dardziński =

Polish actor (1901–1971)

- Born: 30 December 1901; St. Petersburg, Russian Empire (now Russia)
- Died: 13 May 1971 (aged 69); Warsaw, Polish People’s Republic
- Occupation: Actor
- Years active: 1938–1966

Bronisław Dardziński (30 December 1901 – 13 May 1971) was a Polish actor. He appeared in seventeen films between 1938 and 1966.

== Selected filmography ==
- Doctor Murek (1939)
- Lotna (1959)
- Pharaoh (1966)
