= Stanisław Gronkowski =

Polish actor (1922–2004)

Stanisław Gronkowski (January 8, 1922 Radom – May 20, 2004 Kraków) was a Polish actor who performed at the Rhapsodic Theatre and the Old Theatre of Helena Modrzejewska in Kraków.

In 1989 Gronkowski was awarded the Officer's Cross of OOP.

Gronkowski died in 2004, and was buried in Kraków at the Salwator cemetery.

== Filmography ==
- Podhale w ogniu (1955) as a peasant
- Wolne miasto (1958) as a phone receptionist Kozubek
- Kalosze szczęścia (1958) as Tadeusz Kościuszko, the actor
- Inspekcja pana Anatola (1959) as a receptionist in a hotel
- Spotkania w mroku (Begegnung im Zwielicht, 1960)
- Zobaczymy się w niedzielę (1960) as Flower
- Spotkanie ze szpiegiem (1964) as the teacher Mituła
- Cała naprzód (1966) as the officer
- Four Tank-men and a dog (1966-1970) as Kugel
- Ściana Czarownic (1966) as Szczygieł (unnamed in titles)
- Słońce wschodzi raz na dzień (1967) as Wigezy
- How I unleashed World War II (1969) as "Wilk", a partizan
- Południk zero (1970) as Peruczka
- Podróż za jeden uśmiech (1971) as a participant of the holidays
- Sędziowie. Tragedya (1974) as a meyer
- Opowieść w czerwieni (1974) as a cinema operator
- Racławice. 1794 (1979) as Tadeusz Kościuszko
- Ród Gąsieniców (1979)
- Z biegiem lat, z biegiem dni... (1980) as Trybulak
- Droga (1980) as the father of Szymon
- Nocny gość (1989) as a leper
