= Bożena Kurowska =

Polish actress (1937–1969)

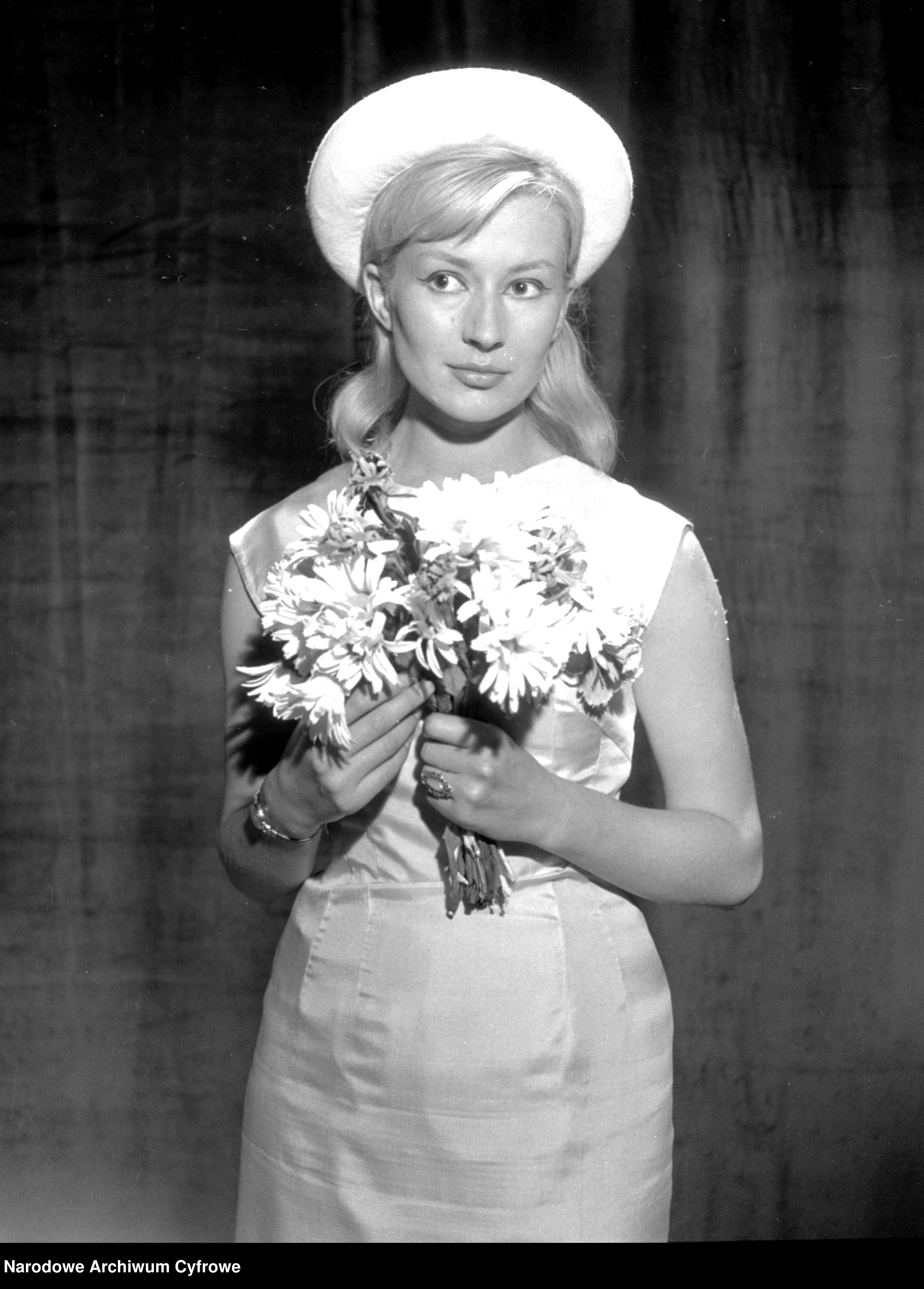
- Born: 21 August 1937; Łuków, Poland
- Died: 16 September 1969 (aged 32); Warsaw, Poland
- Occupation: Actress
- Years active: 1959–1966

Bożena Kurowska (21 August 1937 – 16 September 1969) was a Polish actress. She appeared in five films between 1959 and 1966.

== Selected filmography ==
- Lotna (1959)
- Na białym szlaku (1962)
