= Suspended (film) =

- Directed by: Waldemar Krzystek
- Edited by: Krzysztof Osiecki
- Release date: 1987
- Country: Poland
- Language: Polish

Suspended (Polish: W zawieszeniu) is a 1987 Polish film directed by Waldemar Krzystek. The film tells the story of a former Home Army (AK) member who hides for several years in the cellar of the house belonging to the woman he secretly married during the war. Making clear the link between this film and Andrzej Wajda's Man of Marble, the director chose two of Wajda's actors; Krystyna Janda and Jerzy Radziwiłowicz.

== Cast ==
- Krystyna Janda as Anna Mroczyńska
- Jerzy Radziwiłowicz as Marcel Wysocki
- Sława Kwaśniewska as Maria, mother of Anna
- Andrzej Łapicki as doctor Ruczyński
- Bogusław Linda as UB officer pursuing Marcel
- Bożena Dykiel as nurse, friend of Anna
- Klaudia Sznajder as Wicia, daughter of Anna and Marcel
- Igor Przegrodzki as Wincenty Wysocki, uncle of Marcel
- Danuta Balicka as Jadwiga, wife of Wincenty
- Ryszard Radwański as undercover agent, mole
