= Mieczysław Łoza =

Polish actor (1916–1982)

- Born: 6 January 1916; Lublin, Russian Empire (now Lublin, Poland)
- Died: 21 May 1982 (aged 66); Wrocław, Poland
- Occupation: Actor
- Years active: 1952–1982

Mieczysław Łoza (6 January 1916 – 21 May 1982) was a Polish actor. He appeared in more than 40 films and television shows between 1952 and 1982. He was married to the actress Halina Buyno-Łoza.

== Selected filmography ==
- Lotna (1959)
