= Zdzisław Karczewski =

Polish actor

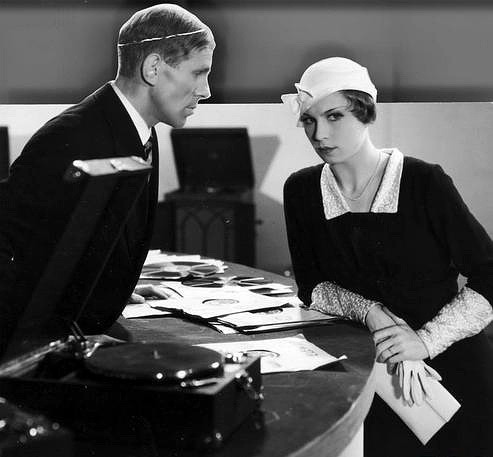
- Karczewski (left), Żelichowska (right) in Polish film Szpieg w masce (1933)
- Born: 22 March 1903; Warsaw, Congress Poland
- Died: 30 September 1970 (aged 67); Wrocław, Poland
- Occupation: Actor
- Years active: 1933–1970

Zdzisław Karczewski (22 March 1903 – 30 September 1970) was a Polish film actor. He appeared in more than 30 films between 1933 and 1970.

== Selected filmography ==
- Bolek i Lolek (1936)
- Róża (1936)
- Drugi brzeg (1962)
- Black Wings (1963)
- Sami swoi (1967)
