= Take It Easy (1974 film) =

- Directed by: Sylwester Chęciński
- Written by: Andrzej Mularczyk
- Starring: Wacław Kowalski; Władysław Hańcza
- Edited by: Krzysztof Osiecki
- Music by: Andrzej Korzyński
- Release date: 28 May 1974
- Running time: 89 min
- Country: Poland
- Language: Polish

Take It Easy (Polish: Nie ma mocnych) is a 1974 Polish comedy film directed by Sylwester Chęciński. It is the second part of a trilogy about two quarreling peasants Kargul and Pawlak, which started with Sami swoi, and concluded with Kochaj albo rzuć. The title is Polish idiom, literally translating as "There is no one powerful enough".

== Cast ==
- Wacław Kowalski − Kazimierz Pawlak
- Władysław Hańcza − Władysław Kargul
- Anna Dymna − Ania Pawlakówna
- Andrzej Wasilewicz − Zenek Adamiec, narzeczony Ani
- Maria Zbyszewska − Pawlakowa
- Halina Buyno-Łoza − Kargulowa
- Jerzy Janeczek − Witia Pawlak
- Ilona Kuśmierska − Jadźka
