= The Last Ferry =

1989 Polish film

- DVD cover
- Directed by: Waldemar Krzystek
- Written by: Waldemar Krzystek; Slawomir Sosnowski
- Starring: Krzysztof Kolberger
- Cinematography: Dariusz Kuc
- Edited by: Krzysztof Osiecki
- Release date: 1 December 1989
- Running time: 88 minutes
- Country: Poland
- Language: Polish

The Last Ferry (Polish: Ostatni prom) is a 1989 Polish drama film directed by Waldemar Krzystek. It was screened in the Un Certain Regard section at the 1990 Cannes Film Festival.

== Plot ==
Poland 1981. There is a growing economic and political crisis in the country. The Wilanów ferry leaves from Świnoujście to Hamburg with a trip around the Baltic cities. However, its participants are only interested in the first port on the route - Hamburg, where almost all plan to leave the ship and stay in the West. However, halfway to the ferry, the news about the introduction of martial law in the country and an order to return to the country arrives. At the news of the return, passengers raise a kind of revolt and start lowering the lifeboats on their own, so as not to return. The drama of the situation increases when German cutters approach the ship, informing people on board about the situation in Poland through megaphones. Passengers start jumping straight into the sea. In one of the last scenes, on the empty ferry calling at the port, there are only those who could not escape - the crew, a few passengers and a dog.

The plot of the film is interwoven with the story of a high school teacher, Marek Ziarno, whose task is to smuggle important documents related to NSZZ Solidarność to the West and its duel with Służba Bezpieczeństwa (secret service) agents on the ferry who tried to prevent it.

== Cast ==
- Krzysztof Kolberger - Marek Ziarno
- Agnieszka Kowalska - Renata
- Dorota Segda - Kasia Trelkowska
- Ewa Wencel - Ewa
- Artur Barciś - Rysiek
- Jerzy Zelnik - Andrzej
- Aleksander Bednarz - First officer Stefan
- Miroslaw Konarowski - Michal Walewski
- Maciej Robakiewicz - Steward
- Feliks Szajnert - SB officer Stalinski
- Anna Ciepielewska - Marecka
- Barbara Grabowska - Jola
- Leonard Andrzejewski - Commerade Zdzislaw Marecki
- Leon Niemczyk - Captain
