= Adam Pawlikowski =

Polish film actor

Adam Pawlikowski (1925–1976) was a Polish film actor.

== Selected filmography ==
- Kanal (1957)
- Lotna (1959)
- Bad Luck (1960)
- Goodbye to the Past (1961)
- Ashes and Diamonds (1961- US release)
- It Started Yesterday (1961)
- Na białym szlaku (1962)
- The Saragossa Manuscript (1965)
- Dzięcioł (1971)

== Bibliography ==
- Haltof, Marek. Polish National Cinema. Berghahn Books, 2002.
