= 80 Million =

2011 film

- Film poster
- Directed by: Waldemar Krzystek
- Written by: Krzysztof Konopka; Waldemar Krzystek
- Starring: Filip Bobek
- Release date: 25 November 2011
- Running time: 105 minutes
- Country: Poland
- Language: Polish
- Box office: $680,834

80 Million (Polish: 80 milionów) is a 2011 Polish drama film directed by Waldemar Krzystek. The film was selected as the Polish entry for the Best Foreign Language Oscar at the 85th Academy Awards, but it did not make the final shortlist. It is about Polish activists who withdrew 80 million zlotys from Solidarity's accounts hours before the accounts were blocked by martial law in Poland in December 1981. This helped organize Solidarity's underground activities for years.

== Cast ==
- Filip Bobek as Władysław Frasyniuk
- Marcin Bosak as Maks
- Wojciech Solarz as Staszek
- Piotr Głowacki as Sobczak
- Sonia Bohosiewicz as Czerniak
- Olga Frycz as Marta
- Krzysztof Czeczot as Józek
- Maciej Makowski as Piotr
- Mariusz Benoit as Stary
- Jan Frycz as Baginski
- Krzysztof Stroiński as Zegota
- Przemyslaw Bluszcz as Bogdan Stroinski
- Agnieszka Grochowska as Anka

== Reception ==
In a review for The Hollywood Reporter, Stephen Dalton calls the film a "rousing heist thriller" and "an enjoyably upbeat thrill ride and a universal celebration of victory over tyranny".

== See also ==
- List of submissions to the 85th Academy Awards for Best Foreign Language Film
- List of Polish submissions for the Academy Award for Best Foreign Language Film
- Heist film
