= Marian Kociniak =

Polish film and television actor (1936–2016)

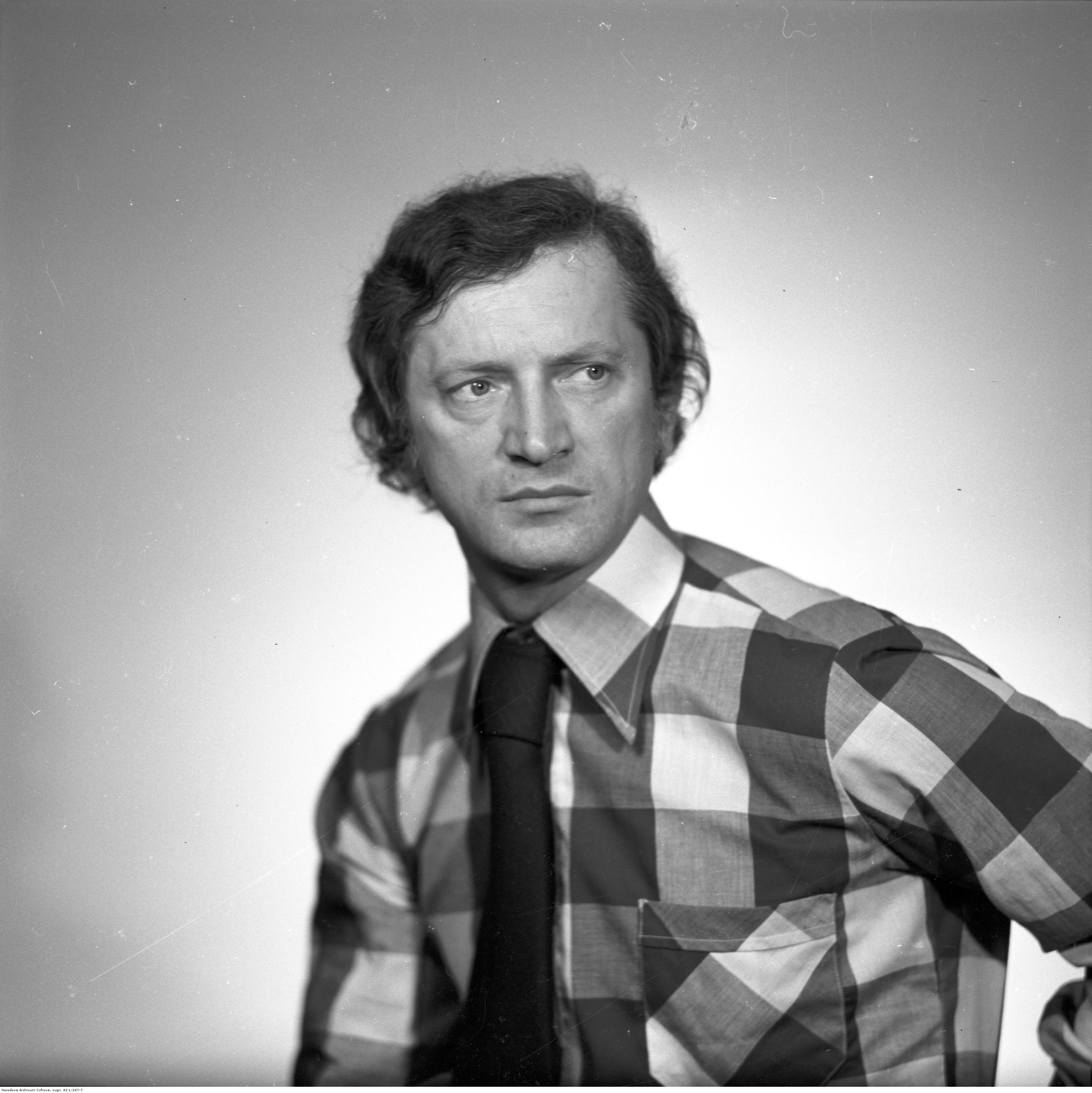
- Marian Kociniak.
- Born: 11 January 1936; Warsaw, Poland
- Died: 17 March 2016 (aged 80); Warsaw, Poland
- Resting place: Evangelical Reformed Cemetery, Warsaw, Poland
- Education: Aleksander Zelwerowicz National Academy of Dramatic Art
- Occupation: Actor
- Years active: 1959–2013
- Spouse: Grażyna Kociniak

Marian Kociniak (Polish: [ˈma.rjan kɔˈt͡ɕi.ɲak]; 11 January 1936 – 17 March 2016) was a film, television, voice and radio actor and comedian. He was best known from portraying Franciszek Dolas, a main character in the 1969 film How I Unleashed World War II. Kociniak also had main and secondary roles in films such as Morning Stars (1979), Danton (1983), Fucha, Bermuda Triangle (1987), Circus is Leaving (1987), Yesterday Goodbye (1993), Sir Thaddeus (1999), Kalipso (2000), and The Last Action (2009), as well as in television series such as Janosik (1974), Jan Serce (1981), Sukces (1995), and The Deep End (2013).

== Biography ==
Marian Kociniak was born on 11 January 1936 in Warsaw, Poland. He grew up in the district of Mokotów. During the German occupation in World War II, his home was burned down, and his family took shelter in an abandoned brick factory.

He graduated from the engine manufacturing vocational school, and in 1958, from the Aleksander Zelwerowicz National Academy of Dramatic Art in Warsaw. He was a student of Ludwik Sempoliński. From 1959 to 2010, he acted in the Ateneum Theatre, and from 2010 to 2013, in the Wola Theatre.

His film debut was in 1960, when he had a small uncredited role in Innocent Sorcerers. Kociniak became best known from portraying Franciszek Dolas, a main character in the 1969 film How I Unleashed World War II. He also had main and secondary roles in films such as Morning Stars (1979), Danton (1983), Fucha, Bermuda Triangle (1987), Circus is Leaving (1987), Yesterday Goodbye (1993), Sir Thaddeus (1999), Kalipso (2000), and The Last Action (2009), as well as in television series such as Janosik (1974), Jan Serce (1981), Sukces (1995), and The Deep End (2013).

Additionally Kociniak acted in numerous plays of Polish Television. He also appeared in episodes the Kabaret Starszych Panów comedy troupe show, and worked in Polish Radio Three. There, he co-hosted together with Andrzej Zaorski sketch comedy segments titled Kulisy srebrnego ekranu, in the radio show 60 minut na godzinę, and performed the theme song of programme Powtórka z rozrywki.

In 2003, during the 8th Festival of Stars in Międzyzdroje, Kociniak has unveiled his plaque at the Promenade of Stars walk of fame.

Throughout his career, he completely refused giving interviews. The exception was made for TVP Info in 2010, in light of the 50th anniversary of his work in the industry. In April 2010, was also published book Spełniony by Remigiusz Grzela, consisting of the interview with him. Kociniak retired from acting in 2013.

He was an honorary member of the campaign support committee of Bronisław Komorowski during the 2010 and 2015 presidential elections in Poland.

Kociniak died in a Warsaw hospital on 17 March 2016, at the age of 80. He was buried on 23 March 2016, next to his wife, at the Warsaw Evangelical Reformed Cemetery.

== Private life ==
For over 50 years he was married to film editor Grażyna Kociniak (died 2016). Together they had a daughter, Weronika, and he was also a stepfather to his wife's son, Piotr.

He was also a cousin of actor Jan Kociniak.

== Filmography ==
=== Films ===
Year	Title	Role	Notes
1960	Innocent Sorcerers	Concert attendant	Uncredited
1960	Mario i czarodziej		Television play
1961	Warszawska ulica		Television play
1961	Mistrz Pathelin		Television play
1961	Decyzje		Television play
1961	Bal manekinów		Television play
1962	The Two Who Stole the Moon	Grzegorz Nieborak	Uncredited
1962	Gangsters and Philanthropists	Restaurant client	
1962	Czerwone berety	Grzegorz Warecki	
1962	Tak miało być	Abel	Television play
1963	Wiano	Staszek's friend	
1963	Przy torze kolejowym	Man	Short film
1963	Węzeł rodzinny	Son #1	Television play
1963	Stworzenie świata	Szymek	Television play
1963	Romans Teresy Hennert		Television play
1963	Dzieje jednego pocisku	Bandit	Television play
1964	Five	Kazio	
1964	Wspólny pokój	Student	Television play
1965	Sobótki	Karol	
1965	Stara cegielni		Television play
1965	Piękna Helena	Ajax	Television play
1965	Ballada wigilijna		Television play
1966	Maria and Napoleon	Palace guard	
1966	Skinny and Others	Party member	
1966	The Barrier	Tram driver	
1966	Pożegnanie z Marią	Piotr	Television play
1966	Aszantka	Franek	Television play
1966	Godziny miłości	Feliks	Television play
1967	The Sun Rises Once Daily	Mały	
1967	Żołnierz Królowej Madagaskaru	Theatre stage manager	Television play
1967	Nominacja	Sasza	Television play
1968	Last After the God	Piotr Kwiatkowski	
1969	How I Unleashed World War II	Franciszek Dolas	Main role
1969	Bracia syjamscy	Sanor	Television play
1970	Obecność		Television play
1970	Mała ankieta	Janiak	Television play
1971	The Woodpecker	Reporter	
1971	Action Brutus	Krysiak	
1971	Gwiazda Wytrwałości	Iwanowski	
1971	Czekając na Godota	Lucky	Television play
1972	Wesele z generałem	Jać	Television play
1972	Lato w Nohant	Clesinger	Television play
1973	Blue as the Black Sea	Adam	
1973	Wszyscy moi synowe	George	Television play
1973	Samoobsługa	Ben	Television play
1973	Rewolwer na deszczu	Hugo	Television play
1973	Ktoś Nowy	Karol Kukuła	Television play
1974	Santa Claus Urgently Wanted	"Not hugged" person	
1974	Gra	Stefan Kozłowski	
1974	Janosik	Burgrave	
1974	Skamieniały las	Jason Maple	Television play
1974	Popiół i diament	Drewnowski	Television play
1974	Partia na instrument drewniany	Łaciak	Television play
1974	Niemcy	Jureś	Television play
1974	Dochodzenie	Mały	Television play
1975	Bajadera	Janusz	Television play
1975	Żywa maska	Physician	Television play
1975	Reportarz poetycki		Television play
1975	Henryk IV	Poins	Television play
1975	Babbitt	Narrator	Television play
1975	Amfitriin 38	Mercury	Television play
1976	Rzecz listopadowa	Wedding guest	Television play
1976	Opinia		Television play
1977	Króliczek	Krystian	Television play
1977	Dla szczęścia	Jan	Television play
1977	Czy Pan nie rozumie? To pomyłka!	Quinn	Television play
1978	Włamanie o północy	Thief	Television play
1978	Pamela	Al Sherwood	Television play
1978	Ich głowy	Valorin	Television play
1979	Morning Stars	Piotr Łoboda	Main role
1979	Playing with the Devil	Marcin Kabat	Television play
1979	Pechowy dzień i zbrodnia i kara	Shop assistant	Television play
1979	Brzechwa – dzieciom		Television play
1979	Bal Manekinów	Manekin 41	Television play
1979	Bal Manekinów	Ribandel	Television play
1980	Schwarzes Gold	Paul Budach	
1980	Supeł	Gustaw	Television play
1980	Król w Kraju Rozkoszy	King	Television play
1981	Molier, czyli zmowa świętoszków	La Grange	Television play
1981	Dom na granicy	Husband	Television play
1982	O istnieniu cudownych miejsc	Narrator	Documentary film; voice
1983	Danton	Jean-Baptiste Robert Lindet	
1983	Fucha	Zgred	Main role
1983	O victorii wiedeńskiej	Narrator	Documentary film; voice
1984	Love of the Charts	Jul	
1984	Sposób na życie	Dr. Grzesiewicz	Television play
1985	Szewcy	Sajetan Tempe	Television play
1985	Odwet	David Ryder	Television play
1985	Anioł na dworcu	Stranger	Television play
1987	Bermuda Triangle	Jarek	Main role
1987	Circus is Leaving	Jan Kossakowski	Main role
1988	Kantata o łożu	Husband	Television play
1989	Rififi po sześćdziesiątce	Andrzej Nowisz	
1989	Kwartet	Lena's father	Television play
1990	Polonez	Iosif Igelström	Television play
1992	Bon Appétit, My Little TV	Grandfather	
1992	Moskwa – pietruszki	Czarnowąsy	Television play
1993	Yesterday Goodbye	Roman	Main role
1993	Śmierć Tarełkina	Raspluyev	Television play
1993	Poza miastem	Cosmo Saltana	Television play
1993	Manhattan Poker	Speed	Television play
1993	Łuk Triumfalny	Morozov	Television play
1993	Elegia dla jednej pani	Man	Television play
1993	Coś w rodzaju miłości	Tom O'Toole	Television play
1994	Sokół maltański	Casper Gutman	Television play
1994	Pusta kołyska	Frost	Television play
1994	O przemyślności kobiety niewiernej	Man	Television play
1994	Na dnie	Kleszcz	Television play
1995	Zdrapka	General	Television play
1995	Przeszłość jest nieśmiertelna		Television play
1995	Grzeszki tatusia	Thomas Maddison	Television play
1995	Górski hotel	Vilem Pechar	Television play
1996	Tańczyłem	Priest	Television play
1996	Boso ale w ostrogach	Staszek's father	Television play
1999	Sir Thaddeus	Protazy	
2000	Kalipso	Henryk Roszponka	Main role
2002	Noc poślubna	Narrator	Short film; voice
2005	Król Edyp	Servant	Television play
2009	The Last Action	Kazimierz Iwanowski "Kotek"	Main role
2009	Warszawa	Antique dealer	Television play

=== Television series ===
Year	Title	Role	Notes
1965	Wyzywajem ogoń na siebja	Jan Tyma	
1965	Stawka większa niż życie	Piotr	Episode: "Wróg jest wszędzie" (no. 1)
1966	Wojna domowa	Edek	Episode: "Dzień matki" (no. 9)
1974	Janosik	Burgrave	13 episodes
1981	Jan Serce	Piotr Krukowski	8 episodes
1995	Sukces	Dydak	Main role; 9 episodes
2001	Myszka Walewska	Ryszard Tomczyk	Main role; 3 episodes
2012	Spadkobiercy	Harriet and Harry Ferguson's father	1 episode
2013	The Deep End	Professor	3 episodes

=== Video games ===
Year	Title	Role	Notes
2003	Jak rozpętałem drugą wojnę światową	Franciszek Dolas	Voice

== Awards and decorations ==
- Officer's Cross of the Order of Polonia Restituta (2001)
- Knight's Cross of the Order of Polonia Restituta (1988)
- Gold Cross of Merit (1974)
- Gloria Artis Medal for Merit to Culture (2010)
