= Na białym szlaku =

1963 film

- Directed by: Jarosław Brzozowski; Andrzej Wróbel
- Written by: Alina Centkiewicz; Czesław Centkiewicz
- Starring: Leon Niemczyk
- Release date: 1962
- Running time: 74 minutes
- Country: Poland
- Language: Polish

Na białym szlaku is a 1962 Polish drama film directed by Jarosław Brzozowski and Andrzej Wróbel.

== Cast ==
- Leon Niemczyk as Sikora
- Emil Karewicz as Oberleutnant Weber
- Ryszard Kotys as Bjorn
- Kazimierz Talarczyk as Olaf Peterson
- Bożena Kurowska
- Robert Rogalski
- Witold Pyrkosz
- Kazimierz Wilamowski
- Jerzy Krasowski as Hans
- Barbara Połomska
- Adam Pawlikowski
