= Waldemar Krzystek =

Polish film director

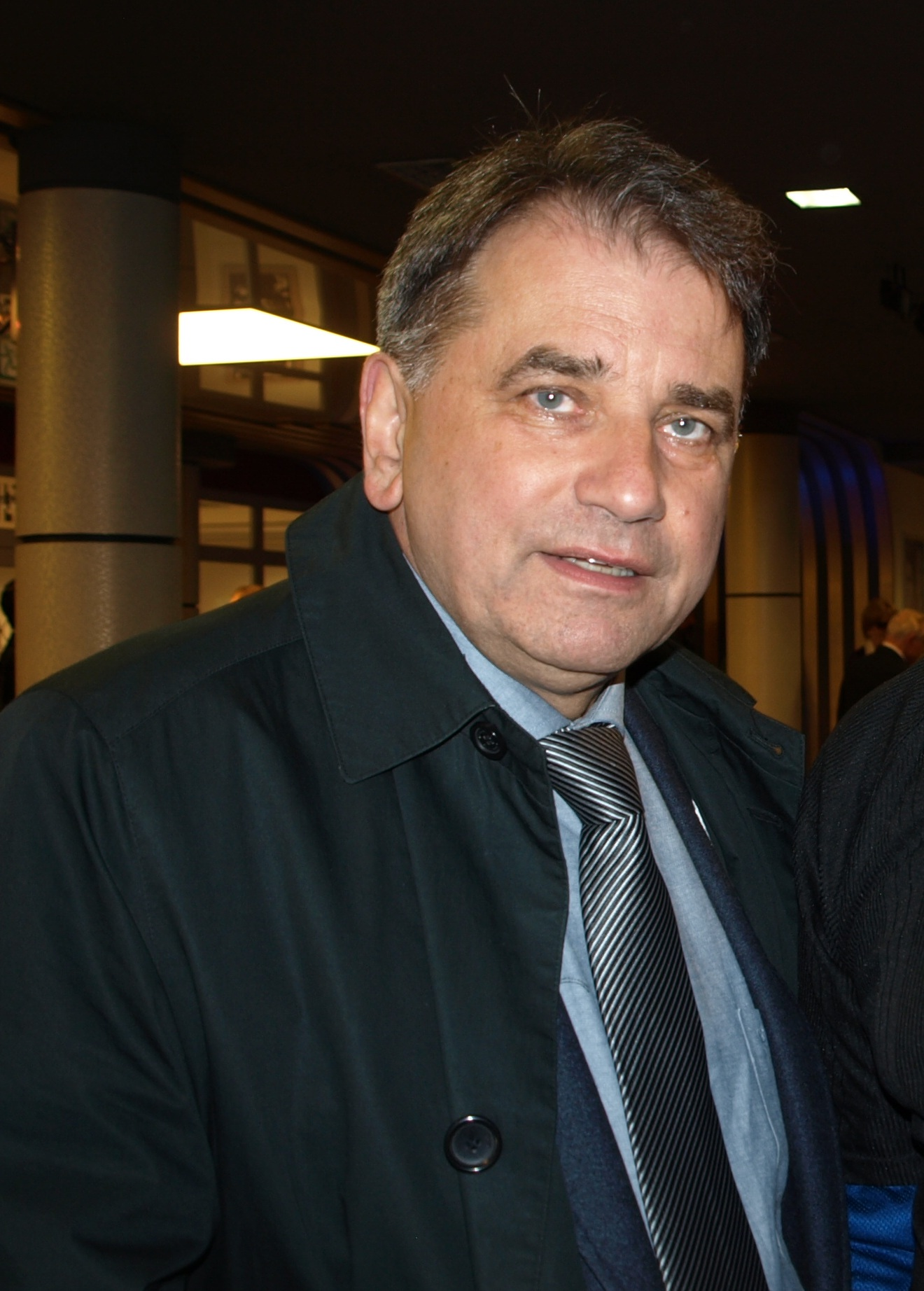
- Waldemar Krzystek in 2015
- Born: 23 November 1953 (age 72); Swobnica, Poland
- Occupations: Film director Screenwriter
- Years active: 1984–present

Waldemar Krzystek (born 23 November 1953) is a Polish film director and screenwriter. His film Ostatni prom was screened in the Un Certain Regard section at the 1990 Cannes Film Festival.

His 2008 cold war romance Little Moscow (Mała Moskwa), won him a Golden Lion at the XXXIII annual Polish Film Festival. His 2011 film 80 Million was selected as the Polish entry for the Best Foreign Language Oscar at the 85th Academy Awards, but it did not make the final shortlist.

== Filmography ==
- Powinowactwo (1984)
- W zawieszeniu (1987)
- Ostatni prom (1989)
- Zwolnieni z zycia (1992)
- Polska smierc (1995)
- Nie ma zmiluj (2000)
- Mała Moskwa (2008)
- 80 Million (2011)
- Fotograf (2014)
