= Lotna =

1959 film directed by Andrzej Wajda

- Directed by: Andrzej Wajda
- Written by: Andrzej Wajda and Wojciech Żukrowski
- Starring: Jerzy Pichelski; Adam Pawlikowski; Jerzy Moes; Mieczysław Łoza; Bożena Kurowska; Bronisław Dardziński
- Cinematography: Jerzy Lipman
- Edited by: Janina Niedźwiecka
- Music by: Tadeusz Baird
- Production company: KADR
- Release date: 1959
- Running time: 90 minutes
- Country: Poland
- Language: Polish

Lotna is a 1959 Polish war film directed by Andrzej Wajda.

== Overview ==
This highly symbolic film is both the director's tribute to the long and glorious history of the Polish cavalry, as well as a more ambiguous portrait of the passing of an era. Wajda was the son of a Polish Cavalry officer who was murdered in the Katyn massacre.

The horse Lotna represents the entire Romantic tradition in culture, a tradition that had a huge influence in the course of Polish history and the formation of Polish literature. Lotna is Wajda's meditation on the historical breaking point that was 1939, as well as a reflection on the ending of an entire era for literature and culture in Poland and in Europe as a whole. Writing of the film, Wajda states that it "held great hopes for him, perhaps more than any other." Sadly, Wajda came to think of Lotna "a failure as a film."

The film remains highly controversial, as Wajda includes a mythical scene in which Polish horsemen suicidally charge a unit of German tanks, an event that never actually happened.

== Synopsis ==
During the Second World War, Poland has been invaded by Nazi Germany. Lotna, a beautiful mare that belonged to a wealthy nobleman (Henryk Cudnowski) is given to Captain Chodakiewicz (Jerzy Pichelski), the commander of a Polish Cavalry squadron, and immediately becomes a bone of contention for everyone in the unit.

Lieutenant Wodnicki (Adam Pawlikowski), Cadet Grabowski (Jerzy Moes) and Sergeant Major Laton (Mieczysław Łoza) jealously scheme among themselves to get their hands on the horse. However, the war takes the lives of Captain Chodakiewicz and Cadet Grabowski, and Lotna falls is passed to Wodnicki. Laton feels he should get the animal and so he steals Lotna and flees amidst the abandoned supply wagons and equipment of the retreating Polish Army.

== Cast ==
- Jerzy Pichelski as Captain Chodakiewicz
- Adam Pawlikowski as Lieutenant Wodnicki
- Jerzy Moes as Cadet Grabowski
- Mieczysław Łoza as Sergeant Major Latoś
- Bożena Kurowska as Ewa
- Henryk Cudnowski as nobleman
- Irena Malkiewicz
- Bronisław Dardziński
- Wiesław Gołas

== Legacy ==
During an ad limina visit of the Polish bishops to the Vatican, Pope Francis referenced the scene in Lotna depicting an equine competition won by a priest, encouraging the Polish bishops to charge forward like the priest in the film and give witness to their faith in society. When learning that the pope had referenced his film, Andrzej Wajda replied that it was worth living as long as he did.

== See also ==
- Cinema of Poland
- List of Polish language films
- Karol Rómmel
