= Love or Leave (film) =

1977 Polish film

Kochaj albo rzuć
- Directed by: Sylwester Chęciński
- Starring: Władysław Hańcza; Wacław Kowalski
- Cinematography: Zygmunt Samosiuk
- Edited by: Krzysztof Osiecki
- Music by: Andrzej Korzyński
- Release date: 13 June 1977
- Running time: 1h 54min
- Country: Poland
- Language: Polish

Kochaj albo rzuć (Love or leave) is a 1977 Polish comedy film directed by Sylwester Chęciński. It is the third and final part of a trilogy about two quarreling peasants Kargul and Pawlak, which started with Sami swoi (All Friends Here or Our Folks; literally "only our own") (1967) and was followed by Nie ma mocnych (a Polish idiom meaning "no one can do") (1974).

== Plot ==
Kazimierz Pawlak and Władysław Kargul, two elderly peasants from Polish conservative countryside, and their granddaughter Ania receive an invitation to visit the United States of America from Kazimierz' brother John. They begin their travels on the ship TSS Stefan Batory, and end it on a United Airline Flight to the O'Hare airport in Chicago. After arriving in Chicago, it is revealed that John died a few days earlier, leaving behind not only his fortune but also an illegitimate daughter. The newly found family member makes Kargul and Pawlak change their prejudices and view of America.

== Cast ==
- Władysław Hańcza − Władysław Kargul
- Wacław Kowalski − Kazimierz Pawlak
- Duchyll Martin Smith − Shirley Gladys Wright
- Bob Lewandowski − September
- Stanley Roginski − Uplander
- Joseph Slowik − Tuner
- Anna Dymna − Ania Pawlak
- Irena Karel − The Passenger
- Maria Zbyszewska − Mania Pawlak
- Halina Buyno-Łoza − Aniela Kargul
- Kazimiera Utrata − Guest
- Andrzej Wasilewicz − Zenek Adamiec
- Jan Pietrzak − Chicago radio host
