= Aleksander Axer =

Polish mathematician

Aleksander Axer (10 October 1880 – 4 October 1948) was a Polish mathematician from Przemyśl who introduced Axer's theorem.

He died suddenly of complications from pharyngitis in Zurich, shortly before his 68th birthday.
