= Andrzej Wasilewicz =

Polish actor and film director

Andrzej Wasilewicz (10 March 1951 – 13 December 2016) was a Polish stage and film actor, and film director.

Wasilewicz was born in Białogard in 1951. In 1975, he graduated from PWST in Warsaw. His first major film role came in 1974—as Zenek, Ania's fiancé—in the film Nie ma mocnych. Since the 1980s he lived in the U.S. and studied at the Columbia University. Wasilewicz had suffered from Parkinson's disease and died from the disease on December 13, 2016, at a hospital on Long Island, New York. He was 65.

== Filmography ==
- Portfel (1970) (uncredited)
- Niebieskie jak Morze Czarne (1971) as a table tennis umpire (uncredited)
- Nie ma mocnych (1974) as Zenek
- Trzecia granica (1975) as Andrzej Bukowian
- Dziewczyna i chłopak (1977) as Tomek's coach
- Kochaj albo rzuć (1977) as Zenek
- Sprawa Gorgonowej (1977) as a police officer
- Bilet powrotny (1978) as a wedding guest
- Aria dla atlety (1979) as Abs
- Racławice 1794 (1979)
- Wolne chwile (1979) as Mikołaj
- Najdłuższa wojna nowoczesnej Europy (1979–1981) as Hans
- Miś (1980) as a son seeing his mother to the airport
- Dom (TV series) (1980) as a steam locomotive worker
- Wizja lokalna 1901 (1980) as teacher Gardo
- Alicja (1982) as a gangster
- Szczęśliwego Nowego Jorku (1997) as a "Klient" witch loppers
