= Janusz Nasfeter =

Polish film director, screenwriter and writer

Janusz Lucjan Nasfeter (15 August 1920 in Warsaw – 1 April 1998 in Warsaw) was a Polish film director, screenwriter and writer. A graduate of the National Film School in Łódź (1951). Mostly known for films addressed to children but with a universal meaning, for which he received numerous awards at the film festivals in Gdańsk, San Sebastián, Moscow, Belgrade, Venice, Tehran and many others

In the 1960s, he succeeded also in making a war film Ranny w lesie (1964), a psychological war drama Weekend z dziewczyną (1968), as well as a crime film Zbrodniarz i panna (1963) with Zbigniew Cybulski and Niekochana (1966) with Elżbieta Czyżewska.

Nasfeter was originally buried at the Służew Old Cemetery, but his remains were moved to a family grave in the Powązki Cemetery in 2018.

== Selected filmography ==
- Królowa pszczół (1977) (Queen of Bees)
- Nie będę cię kochać (1974) (I will not love you)
- Motyle (1973) (Butterflies)
- Ten okrutny, nikczemny chłopak (1972) (This Cruel, Wicked Boy)
- Abel, twój brat (1970) (Abel, Your Brother)
- Weekend z dziewczyną (1968) (Weekend with a Girl)
- Niekochana (1966) (Unloved)
- Ranny w lesie (1964) (The Wounded in the Forest)
- Zbrodniarz i panna (1963) (The Criminal and the Maiden)
- Kolorowe pończochy (1960) (Coloured stockings)
- Małe dramaty (1958) (Small Dramas)
