= Wacław Kowalski =

Polish actor

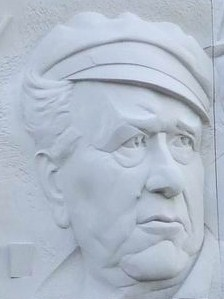
- Born: 2 May 1916; Gzhatsk, Russian Empire
- Died: 27 October 1990 (aged 74); Brwinów, Poland
- Occupation: Actor
- Years active: 1947–1983

Wacław Kowalski (2 May 1916 – 27 October 1990) was a Polish actor. He appeared in more than eighty films from 1947 to 1983.

== Selected filmography ==
Year	Title	Role	Notes
1961	The Artillery Sergeant Kalen	platoon-leader Kolanowski	
1962	The Two Who Stole the Moon	smith in Zapiecek	
1967	Sami swoi	Kazimierz Pawlak	
1970	How I Unleashed World War II	Kiedros, sergeant in French Foreign Legion	
1974	Take It Easy	Kazimierz Pawlak	
1977	Kochaj albo rzuć	Kazimierz Pawlak	
