= Leon Kruczkowski =

Polish writer, publicist and public figure (1900–1962)

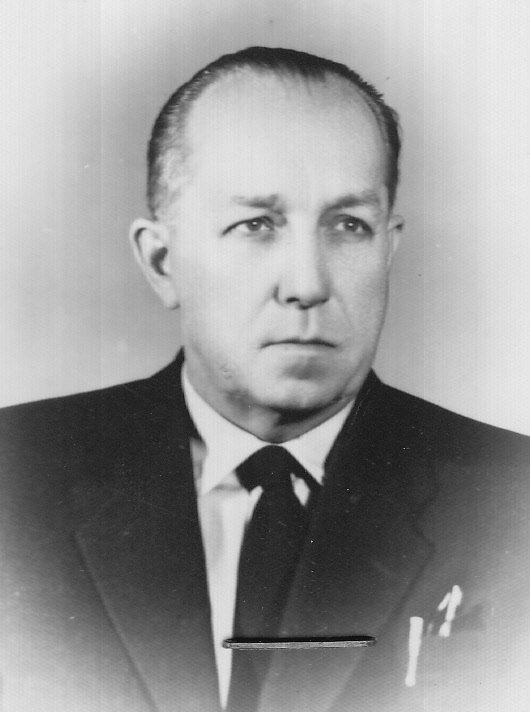

Member of the State Council of the Polish People's Republic
- In office 20 February 1957 – 1 August 1962

Personal details
- Born: 28 June 1900 Kraków, Grand Duchy of Kraków
- Died: 1 August 1962 (aged 62)
- Resting place: Powązki Military Cemetery
- Citizenship: Poland
- Party: Polish United Workers' Party
- Education: Kraków Higher School of Industry
- Occupation: Politician, writer

Leon Kruczkowski (28 June 1900 – 1 August 1962) was a Polish writer, publicist and public figure. He wrote books and dramas and was prominent in Polish theatre of the post-World War II period. His best known work is the drama Niemcy ('The Germans'), written in 1949.

A left-wing activist before World War II, Kruczkowski spent the war in German prisoner of war camps. After the war, he became active in politics of communist-ruled Poland. He was a deputy minister of culture and art in 1945–1948, member of Polish parliament (Sejm) from 1947 to 1962, and member of the Polish Council of State from 1957. He had significant influence on Polish cultural policies of the period.

== Biography ==
Kruczkowski was born on 28 June 1900 in Kraków. While completing his higher education in chemistry and technology at the Higher School of Industry in Kraków, he published his first poems around 1918 and 1919. He moved to the Dąbrowa Basin in 1926. In 1928 he published his first collection of poems, Młoty nad światem ('Hammers over the World'), and in 1932 his first novel, a "peasant response to Juliusz Słowacki's Kordian", entitled Kordian i cham ('Kordian and the Boor').

In 1933 Kruczkowski became a full-time writer, moved back to Kraków and in 1935 wrote his first play, Bohater naszych czasów ('Hero of our Times'). It was rewritten three years later as Przygoda z Vaterlandem ('An Adventure with Vaterland'), both versions notable for their strong critique of Nazism. He also wrote essays published in leftist magazines and newspapers, and political brochures: Człowiek i powszedność ('Man and Daily Reality', 1936), W klimacie dyktatury ('In the Climate of Dictatorship', 1938), Dlaczego jestem socjalistą? ('Why am I a Socialist?', 1938). He wrote two more novels, Pawie pióra ('Peacock Feathers', 1935) and Sidła ('A Trap', 1937).

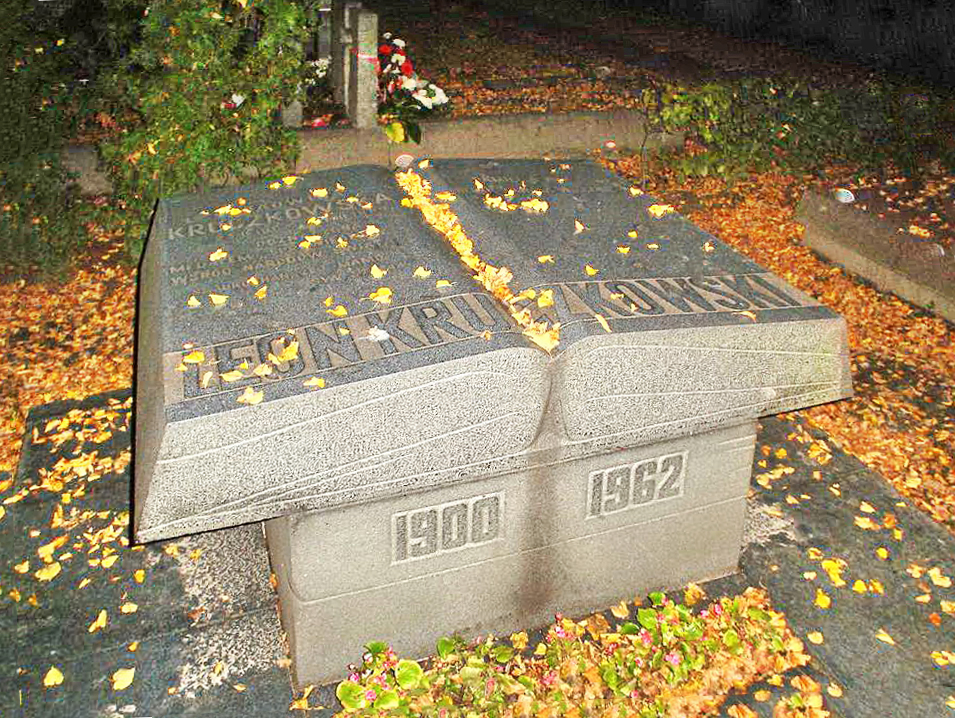
Kruczkowski's tombstone

After Nazi Germany's Invasion of Poland, in which Kruczkowski fought in the Polish Army as an officer, he was arrested and spent the war in a prisoner-of-war camp. In the camp he devoted himself to educational and cultural activities, organizing a theatre. Two of his novels, not finished before the invasion, were lost during World War II. After the war, he resumed his literary career, mainly as a dramatist. His 1948 Odwety ('Retributions') was well received, but it was his 1949 Niemcy ('The Germans'), a drama addressing the issue of Germany's moral responsibility for World War II, that gained him international recognition. It was translated into 14 languages.

In the post-war Polish People's Republic, Kruczkowski served as Undersecretary of State (Deputy Minister) in the Ministry of Culture and Art in 1945–1948 and chairman of the Main Council of the Polish Writers' Union in 1949–1956. Additionally, he was a member of the State National Council from 1945 to 1947, a deputy to the Sejm from 1947 to 1962, and from 1957 a member of the Polish Council of State.

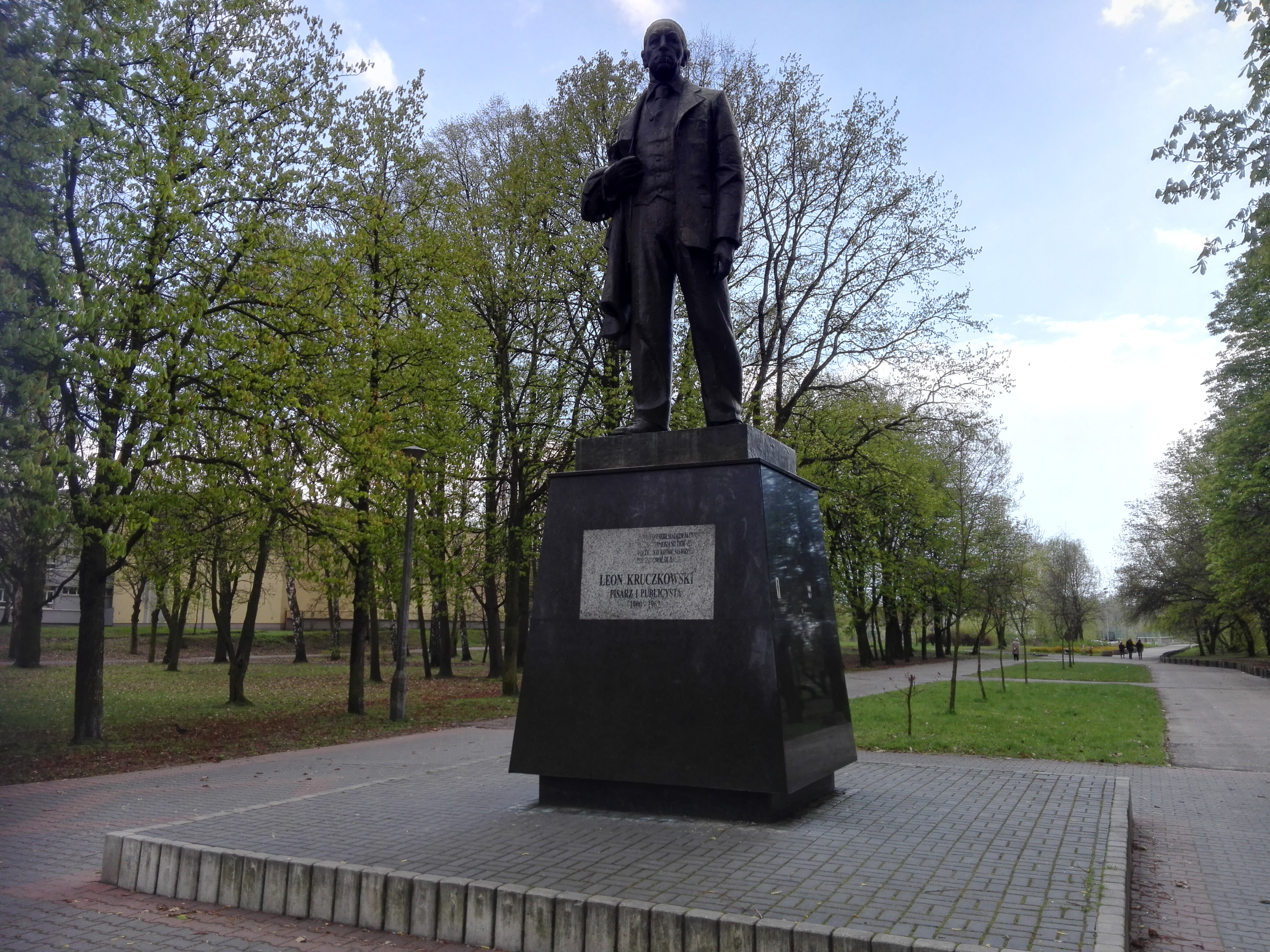
Monument to Leon Kruczkowski located in former Kruczkowski Park in Sosnowiec

He was an active and vocal supporter of the new communist order in Poland, involved in politicizing the culture and in introducing the style and doctrine of socialist realism. Recognized as a major literary figure, Kruczkowski also exerted significant influence on the cultural policy of post-war Poland.

== Honours and awards ==
=== National honours ===
- Commander's Cross of the Order of Polonia Restituta (1946)
- Order of the Banner of Labour, 1st Class (1949)
- Order of the Builders of People's Poland (1954)
- Medal of the 10th Anniversary of People's Poland (1955)

=== Foreign honours ===
- (Socialist Federal Republic of Yugoslavia) Order of Brotherhood and Unity, 1st Class (Yugoslavia, 1946)
- International Stalin Prize for Strengthening Peace Among Peoples (Soviet Union, 1953)
- Officer of the Order of the White Lion (Czechoslovakia, 1957)

== Works ==
- Młoty nad światem ('Hammers over the World', 1928), poetry anthology
- Kordian i cham ('Kordian and the Boor', 1932), novel, adapted to theater in 1935
- Pawie pióra ('Peacock Feathers', 1935), novel
- Bohater naszych czasów ('Hero of our Times', 1935), drama, rewritten as Przygoda z Vaterlandem ('An Adventure with Vaterland', 1938)
- Sidła ('A Trap', 1937), novel
- Odwety ('Retributions', 1948), drama
- Niemcy ('The Germans', 1949), drama
- Juliusz i Ethel ('Julius and Ethel', 1954), drama
- Odwiedziny ('The Visit', 1955), drama
- Pierwszy dzień wolności ('The First Day of Freedom', 1959), drama
- Śmierć gubernatora ('Death of the Governor', 1961), drama
- Szkice z piekła uczciwych ('Sketches from Hell of the Honest', 1963), short stories anthology

https://archive.org/details/leon-kruczkowski-vabaduse-esimene-paev
