= Dziś do ciebie przyjść nie mogę =

Song
- Released: 1943
- Songwriter: Stanisław Magierski

Dziś do ciebie przyjść nie mogę ("I can't come to you today") or Kołysanka ("The Lullaby") is a World War II "partisan" song from occupied Poland. Both lyrics and music were written in 1943 by Stanisław Magierski (nom de guerre "Jacek II"), a pharmacist from Lublin and a member of the anti-Nazi resistance, the Home Army. The most widely known version of the song, however, differs significantly from Magierski's original version, as the song was passed around through word of mouth. The song describes the longing of a soldier in the anti-German partisans who is unable to come see his beloved because he has to hide out in the forest.

In the 1960s the song was a basis for a theatrical play directed by Ireneusz Kanicki. While the play initially opened up in Warsaw, when it was moved to Lublin, the region in which the song originated, it was put on one hundred and eighty times and was attended by more than one hundred thousand viewers, which set a record for attendance at the Juliusz Osterwa Theatre in Lublin.
