= Anna Ciepielewska =

Polish actress (1936–2006)

- Born: 7 January 1936; Ostróg, Poland (now Ostroh, Ukraine)
- Died: 20 May 2006 (aged 70); Warsaw, Poland
- Occupation: Actress
- Years active: 1955-2004

Anna Ciepielewska (7 January 1936 – 20 May 2006) was a Polish actress. She appeared in more than forty films from 1955 to 2004.

== Filmography ==
Year	Title	Role	Notes
1955	Godziny nadziei	Giannina	Uncredited
1957	Trzy kobiety	Celina	
1957	Koniec nocy	Danusia	
1961	Mother Joan of the Angels	Sister Małgorzata	
1962	Knife in the Water	Krystyna	Voice, Uncredited
1963	Troje i las	Hania	
1963	Passenger	Marta	
1963	Przygoda noworoczna	Helena	
1964	Pieciu	Wala's Wife Maryjka	
1965	Beata	Captain Karska	
1965	Obok prawdy	Miska	
1965	Three Steps on Earth	Dr. Wysocka	(segment "Godzina drogi")
1966	Marysia i Napoleon	Chambermaid - Marta	
1967	Dluga noc	Katarzyna Katjanowa	
1968	Weekend z dziewczyna	Anna	
1970	Paragon, gola!		
1975	Orzel i reszka	Teresa	
1977	Bezkresne laki	Marta	
1977	Tanczacy jastrzab	Secretary Basia	
1980	Cma		
1982	Niech cie odleci mara	Witek's Mother	
1983	Slona róza	Hrusowa	
1983	Do góry nogami		
1988	Amerykanka		
1989	The Last Ferry	Marecka	
1992	Koniec gry	Janusz's Mother	
1992	Listopad	Sara's mother	
1992	Zwolnieni z zycia		
1992	Tak tak		
1997	Taranthriller	Matka	
1998	Spona	Cleaning Lady Wieckowska	
