= Erwin Axer =

Polish theatre director, writer and university professor

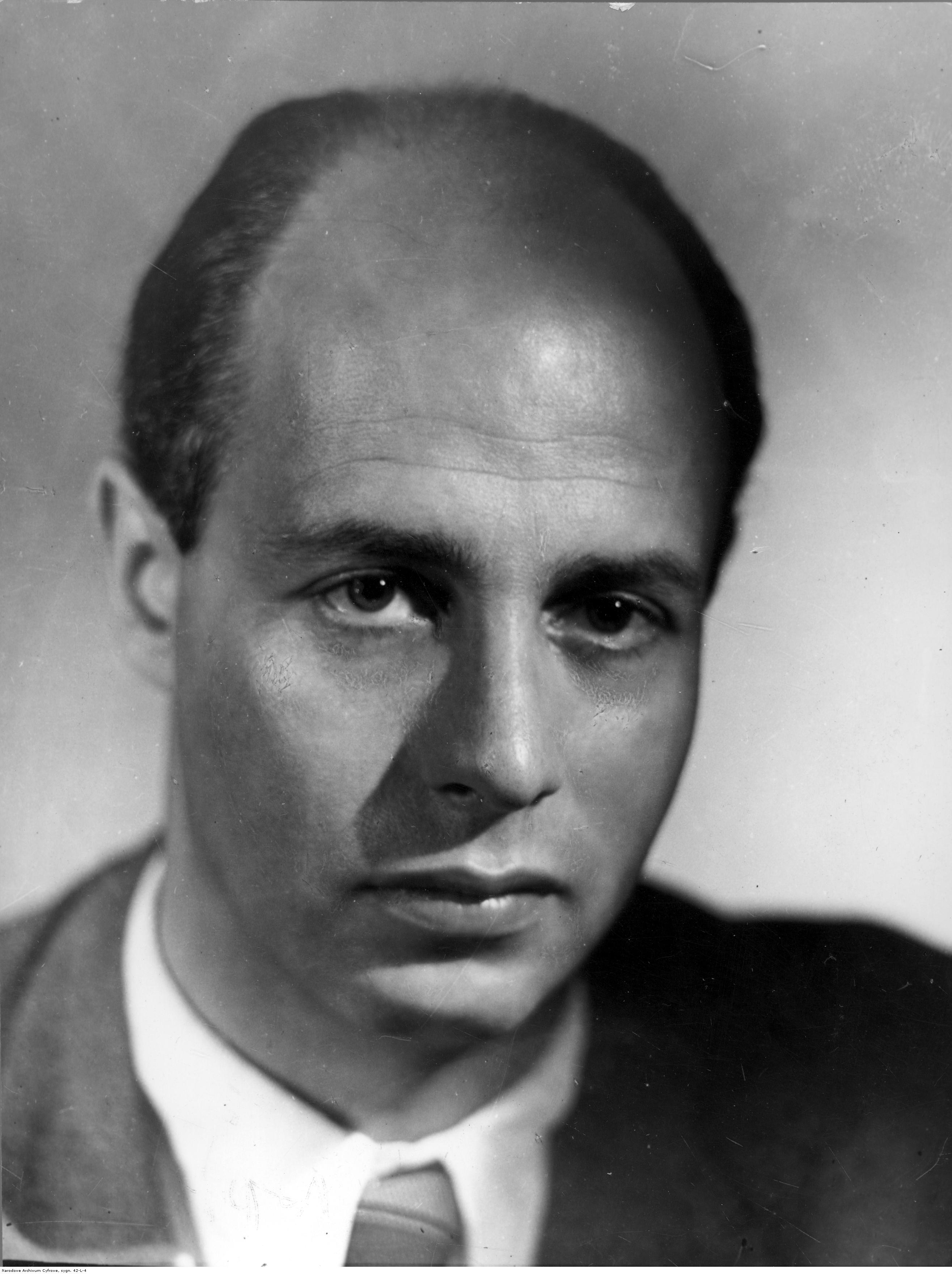
Erwin Axer

Erwin Axer (1 January 1917 – 5 August 2012) was a Polish theatre director, writer and university professor. A long-time head of Teatr Współczesny (Contemporary Theatre) in Warsaw, he also staged numerous plays abroad, notably in German-speaking countries, in the US and Leningrad (USSR). Laureate of Witkacy Prize – Critics' Circle Award (1993).

== Life and career ==
Although born in Vienna, Erwin Axer spent most of his early years in Lwów (modern Lviv, Ukraine). Born to a wealthy Jewish family of Maurycy Axer, a noted lawyer, and Ernestine née Schuster, young Erwin decided to devote his life to theatre. In late 1930s his début was Moon of the Caribbes by Eugene O'Neill. In 1938 he also staged Nędza uszczęśliwiona by Maciej Kamieński and The Tidings Brought to Mary by Paul Claudel. The following year he graduated from the State Institute of Theatrical Art and directed Miss Julie by August Strindberg.

However, the Invasion of Poland and the outbreak of World War II put his career to an end. He spent the first years of the Soviet occupation in Lwów, where he made his living acting and staging dramas in the communist-controlled Polish Dramatic Theatre, the only Polish-language theatre left open in the city. However, following the German takeover of the city and the arrest of his father, Axer moved to Warsaw.

He took part in the Warsaw Uprising of 1944 and was taken prisoner by the Germans and sent to a quarry in Germany as a slave worker. After the war he returned to Poland and in 1946 became the head of the Chamber Theatre of the Soldiers' House in Łódź, an institution that moved to Warsaw the following year and was renamed the Teatr Współczesny. Axer headed that theatre for almost 40 years and retired only in 1981, following the imposition of the Martial Law in Poland.

Between 1954 and 1957 he also headed the National Theatre, the most prestigious scene in post-war Poland. Since 1949 he was also a professor at the Warsaw-based Theatrical Academy. After 1962 Axer regularly directed plays abroad. Among the countries he visited were Germany, Switzerland, USSR, USA and the Netherlands. He was invited by Georgy Tovstonogov to direct three performances at Bolshoy Drama Theatre in Leningrad; the first of them, "The Resistible Rise of Arturo Ui" by Bertolt Brecht in 1963, was recognised as one of the best shows of the decade and had a profound influence on the next generation of Russian directors. Since 1972 he has been a collaborator of the Viennese Burgtheater.

== Bibliography ==
- Magdalena Prokopowicz (ed.): "Żydzi Polscy. Historie niezwykłe". Warszawa: Wydawnictwo DEMART, 2010. ISBN 978-83-7427-392-3.
