= All Friends Here =

1967 Polish comedy film by Sylwester Chęciński

Sami swoi
- DVD cover of color version
- Directed by: Sylwester Chęciński
- Written by: Andrzej Mularczyk
- Starring: Waclaw Kowalski; Władysław Hańcza; Zdzisław Karczewski
- Cinematography: Stefan Matyjaszkiewicz
- Edited by: Janina Niedźwiecka
- Music by: Wojciech Kilar
- Release date: 1967
- Running time: 81 minutes
- Country: Poland
- Language: Polish

All Friends Here (Polish: Sami swoi, literally "only our own"), also known as Our Folks, is a 1967 film, and a first part of a Polish comedic trilogy of movies by Sylwester Chęciński. Its follow-ups are Nie ma mocnych (a Polish idiom meaning "no one can do") (1974), Kochaj albo rzuć ("Love or Leave") (1977), and Sami swoi. Początek ("All Friends Here. The Beginning") (2024).

== The film ==
The film was black and white but was colorized in 2000 by Dynacs Digital Studios for Polish television station Polsat. The score was composed by Wojciech Kilar.

The movie was filmed mostly in Dobrzykowice near Wrocław, with some scenes at Lubomierz and surrounding areas.

It was one of the most popular Polish comedies of its times and still remains an old favorite. Lubomierz has a museum dedicated to the movies, and Toruń has a statue of the two main heroes, Kargul and Pawlak.

== The story ==
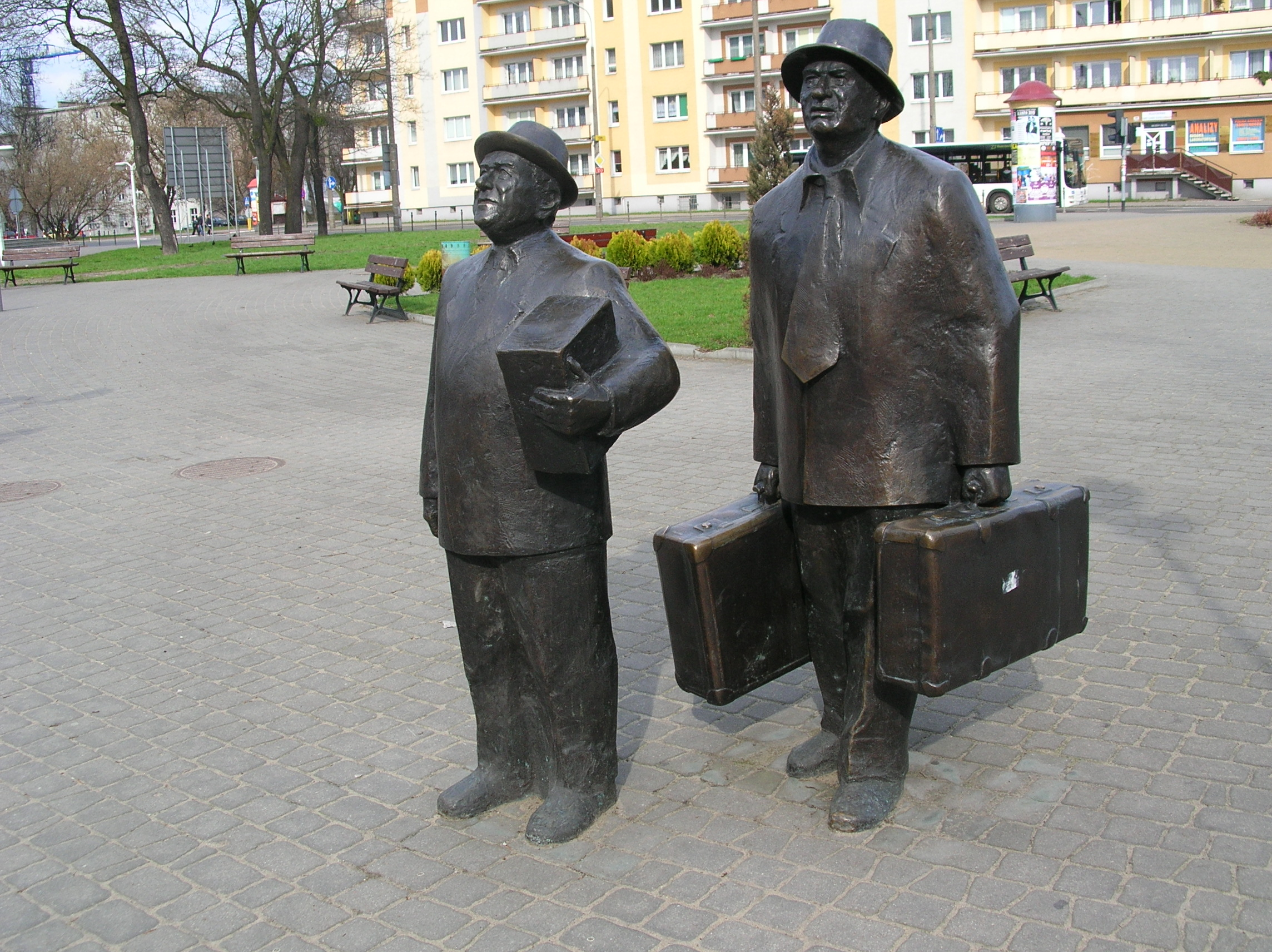
Kargul and Pawlak in Toruń

The movie is the story of the two quarreling families, who after the end of the Second World War were resettled from Kresy to the Regained Territories, after Poland's borders were shifted westwards. The bad blood between them runs to a time when one of Karguls plowed a few inches ('three finger-widths') into the Pawlak's territory, for which one of the Pawlaks hit him with a scythe and then, fearing retribution, emigrated to the United States. Years later, he comes back, and finds that both families live peacefully. His brother, Kazimierz, tells him the story of how the families came to terms, in a form of Romeo and Juliet-like marriage between Pawlak's son, Witia, and Kargul's daughter, Jadźka.

== The actors ==
- Pawlak family
  - Wacław Kowalski –
    - Kazimierz 'Kaźmirz'
    - father of Kazimierz and Jan
  - Zdzisław Karczewski – Jan 'John/Jaśko'
    - Waldemar Dyba – young Jan (dubbed by Kazimierz Dejunowicz)
  - Jerzy Janeczek – Witia
  - Maria Zbyszewska – Mania
  - Natalia Szymańska – Leonia (dubbed by Irena Malkiewicz)
  - Zygmunt Bielawski – Paweł 'Pawełek'
- Kargul family
  - Władysław Hańcza – Władysław 'Władyś' (dubbed by Bolesław Płotnicki)
  - Ilona Kuśmierska – Jadwiga 'Jadźka' (dubbed by Elżbieta Kępińska)
  - Halina Buyno-Łoza – Aniela 'Anielcia'
- Others
  - Eliasz Oparek-Kuziemski – Kokeszko
  - Aleksander Fogiel – sołtys
  - Witold Pyrkosz – 'the guy from Warsaw'
  - Kazimierz Talarczyk – Wieczorek
  - Ryszard Kotys – cats seller
  - Andrzej Mrożek – Russian soldier
  - Jan Łopuszniak – German priest
