= Edward Redliński =

Polish novelist and publicist (1940–2024)

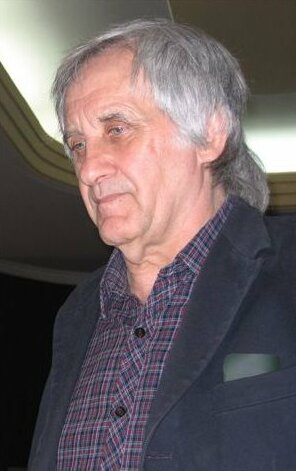
Edward Redliński, 2006

Edward Redliński (1 May 1940 – 11 July 2024) was a Polish novelist, publicist, and dramatist.

Redliński studied geodesy and cartography at the Warsaw University of Technology, and at the College of Journalism at Warsaw University. He worked as a journalist.

Author of humorous and ironic novels and stories about conflict between civilization progress and traditional provincial mentality, among others: Listy z Rabarbaru (1967), Awans (1973), Konopielka (1973), Dolorado (1985), Szczuropolacy (1994), Krfotok (1998). Edward died on 11 July 2024, at the age of 84.
