= Władysław Hańcza =

Polish actor and theatre director

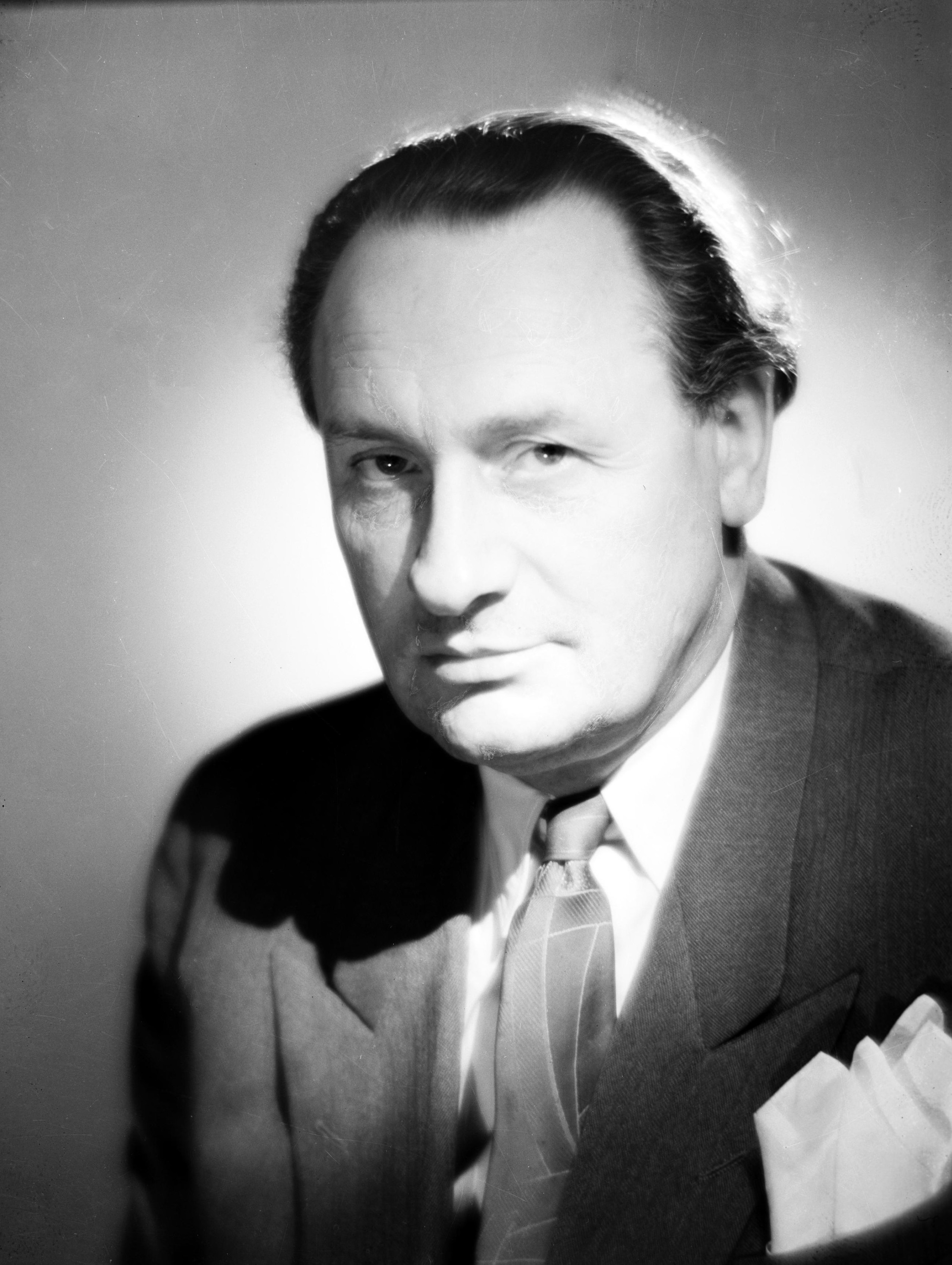
- Born: 18 May 1905; Łódź, Congress Poland
- Died: 19 November 1977 (aged 72); Warsaw, Poland
- Occupations: actor, stage director

Władysław Hańcza (18 May 1905 – 19 November 1977) was a Polish actor and theatre director.

== Education and debut ==
In 1924, he graduated high school in his hometown of Łódź. Afterwards he studied philosophy and Polish philology at the University of Poznań. In 1927, he made his actor debut in a theater in Poznań.

== Career ==
He performed in theatres in Poznań, Katowice, Toruń and Łódź, before he joined the National Theatre in Warsaw in 1939. During the German occupation in World War II, he joined an underground theater in Warsaw. In October 1944, he was deported by the Germans to a forced labour camp in Cottbus, and imprisoned there until the war ended in May 1945.

After the war he was a lecturer at the State Theatre Academy in Warsaw.

== Selected filmography ==
- Popioły (1965)
- Sami swoi (1967) as Władysław Kargul
- Colonel Wołodyjowski (1968) as old Nowowiejski
- Chłopi (1973) as Maciej Boryna
- Potop (1974) as prince Janusz Radziwiłł
- Nie ma mocnych (1974)
- Nights and Days (Noce i Dnie) (1975) as Jan Łada
- Kochaj albo rzuć (1977)
