= Halina Buyno-Łoza =

Polish actress and dancer

Halina Buyno-Łoza (12 December 1907 – 13 September 1991), also known separately with each last name, was a Polish theatre actress and dancer. She is also known for being imprisoned after making public her former role as an informant for the Polish Ministry of Public Security on her colleagues at the Municipal Theatre.

== Education and career ==
Halina Buyno-Łoza was born on 12 December 1907 in Łódź. In 1937, she graduated from the National Institute of Dramatic Art in Warsaw. Before World War II, she was an actress at the Vilnius City Theatre. After the war, she was recruited by the communist Polish government's Security Service to act as an informant for "anti-state crimes", especially among her colleagues at the Municipal Theatre. After a few years, she became worried about what would happen to her friends in the theatre industry if she continued, so she outed herself to others of her actions. In response, from 1952 to 1953, the Polish authorities sentenced her to 1.5 years in prison, but she was released after nine months as amnesty after the death of Joseph Stalin. It was reported later by other inmates of the prison that Buyno-Łoza had been physically abused by the Soviet guards in charge. She later performed at the Polish Theatre in Wrocław until her retirement in 1971.

=== Arts and film ===
She performed at the Municipal Theatre in Vilnius (1937–1939), the Municipal Theatre of Lublin (1945–1952), Theatre of Lower Silesia in Jelenia Góra (1953–1955) and the Polish Theatre in Wrocław (1955–1971). She also played roles in films. She was married to the actor Mieczysław Łoza. She died on 13 September 1991 in Wrocław She was buried in the Osobowice Cemetery in Wrocław.

Initially she played roles of everyday women – rather noisy, sometimes offensive, but always kind-hearted. Later her roles included grandmothers and neighbours, including Aniela Kargul in Sylwester Chęciński's trilogy.

== Filmography ==
Film performances
Year	Title	Role	Notes
1985	Szkoda twoich lez		"Don’t Waste Your Tears"
1983	Zasieki		
1983	Odwet		"Revenge"
1983	The Weather Forecast	Pelagia	
1983	Przekleta ziemia		"Cursed Land"
1983	Karate po polsku	Lezanowa	"Karate In Poland"
1980	Smak wody		"The Taste of Water"
1979	Wolne chwile	Porter	"Free Moments"
1978	Achilles Heel		
1978	Pejzaz horyzontalny	Homemaker 'Grandma'	"Horizontal Landscape"
1978	Granica		
1977	Kochaj albo rzuć	Aniela Kargul	"Love or Leave"
1977	Zanim nadejdzie dzien		"Before The Day Comes"
1976	Zofia	Pensjonariuszka domu starców	
1975	Koniec wakacji	Babcia Jurka	"The End of the Holiday"
1975	Urodziny Matyldy	Sasiadka Okoniowej	"Matilda's Birthday"
1974	Nie ma mocnych	Aniela Kargul	"Take It Easy"
1973	Buleczka		
1973	Sekret	Danuta's ex-landlady	"Secret"
1973	Opetanie	Sasiadka na imprezie	"Possession"
1973	Z tamtej strony teczy		"On The Other Side Of The Rainbow"
1972	Zaraza	Danko	"Plague"
1971	Motodrama	Client at Post Office (uncredited)	
1971	Kardiogram	Zona pacjenta	
