= Sylwester Chęciński =

Polish film director (1930–2021)

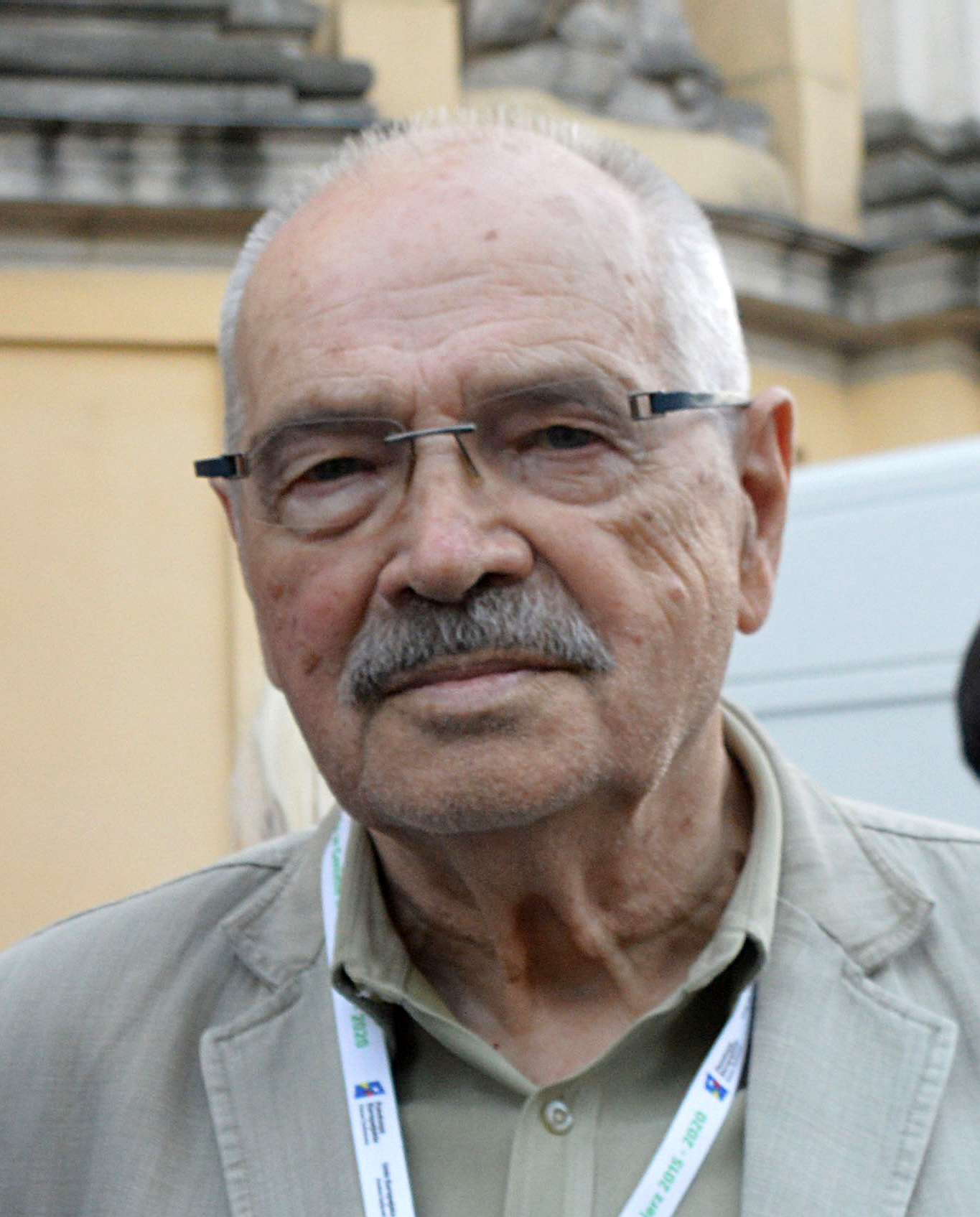
- Chęciński in 2017
- Born: May 21, 1930; Susiec, Poland
- Died: December 8, 2021 (aged 91); Wrocław, Poland
- Resting place: Grabiszyński Cemetery, Wrocław
- Education: National Film School in Łódź
- Occupations: Film director; screenwriter
- Awards: Order of Polonia Restituta; Medal for Merit to Culture – Gloria Artis; Platinum Lions; Polish Academy Life Achievement Award

Sylwester Chęciński (21 May 1930 – 8 December 2021) was a Polish film and television director. He was born in Susiec, Poland, on 21 May 1930. Chęciński died in Wrocław on 8 December 2021, at the age of 91.

== Biography ==
Chęciński was born on 21 May 1930 in Skwarki, Lublin Voivodeship. In 1950, he graduated from the 1st Secondary School of General Education named after Jędrzej Śniadeckiego in Dzierżoniów, and in 1956 the Directing Department of the State Film School in Łódź.

He is best known for the trilogy All Friends Here, Take It Easy and Love or Leave. He directed his first film Historia żółtej ciżemki in 1961. From 1976 to 1980, he was the deputy artistic director of the film group "Iluzjon", and in the years 1988–1991 the deputy artistic director of the film group "Kadr". For lifetime achievement, he received "Platinum Lions" at the 39th Gdynia Film Festival (2014) and the Polish Academy Life Achievement Award (2017).

Chęciński died on 8 December 2021, in Wrocław. On 18 December, after the mass in the Cathedral of St. John the Baptist in Wrocław, he was buried at the Grabiszyński Cemetery in Wrocław.

== Selected filmography ==
- 1961: Historia żółtej ciżemki
- 1964: Agnieszka 46
- 1965: Katastrofa
- 1967: Sami swoi
- 1969: Tylko umarły odpowie
- 1970: Legenda
- 1971: Diament radży
- 1971: Pierwsza miłość
- 1973: Droga
- 1974: Nie ma mocnych
- 1977: Kochaj albo rzuć
- 1978: Roman i Magda
- 1980: Bo oszalałem dla niej
- 1982: Wielki Szu
- 1991: Calls Controlled
- 2006: Przybyli ułani
