= Ewa Krasnodebska =

Polish actress (born 1925)

- Born: Ewa Krasnodębska; 9 July 1925 (age 100); Warsaw, Poland
- Occupation: Actress
- Years active: 1949–2014
- Spouse: Jan Andrzej Zakrzewski (m. 1949; died 2007)
- Awards: Gloria Artis Medal for Merit to Culture

Ewa Krasnodebska (born Ewa Krasnodębska; 9 July 1925) is a Polish actress, known for her extensive career in theatre, film and television from 1949 to 2014.

== Early life ==
Born 9 July 1925 in Warsaw, Poland, she was the only child of Marian Krasnodębski, an economist and senior official at the Mutual Insurance Institution, and Maria (née Badowska), a graduate of the Academy of Fine Arts. Her maternal family had strong artistic traditions. Her grandfather, Adam Badowski, was a renowned painter and professor at the Academy of Fine Arts and her grandmother Maria (née Wąsowska) Badowska (later Rydygier), was a distinguished pianist and professor too at the Higher School of Music in Warsaw.

During her early childhood, she lived in Marcelin, a manor located in the Sielce district of Warsaw. The family later moved to Hrubieszów and then to Mława in the early 1930s. She completed her first year of secondary school in Mława before the outbreak of World War II. In the summer of 1939, they moved in with a relative on Wspólna Street. After her father's return from the eastern front, the family resettled in Mława.

== Career ==
Krasnodebska began her professional acting career at the Polish Theatre in Wrocław from 1949 to 1955, later she performed at the Polish Theatre in Warsaw from 1951 to 1955, the Dramatic Theatre in Warsaw from 1955 to 1958, and the National Theatre in Warsaw from 1958 to 1959. In addition to her stage work, she appeared in several films, including Five Boys from Barska Street (1954), Nikodem Dyzma (1956) and Awantura o Basie (1959). Later in her career she appeared in Before Twilight (2008) and Foreign Body (2014).

== Personal life ==
Krasnodebska was married to journalist and diplomat Jan Zakrzewski. During his diplomatic postings, she spent several years abroad, including in France and the United States. In France she produced a series of interviews with prominent international film stars of Polish Television. Her time in the United States inspired her to write a collection of reports and essays titled Jak odkrywałam Amerykę (How I Discovered America), published in 1983.

In recognition of her contributions to Polish culture, she was awarded the Gloria Artis Medal for Merit to Culture on 22 December 2008. She turned 100 on 9 July 2025.

== Filmography ==
- Foreign Body (2014) - Róza Nilska
- Fenomen (2010) - Aurelia
- Jeszcze nie Wieczór (2008) - Marilyn
- Zbrodniarz, który ukradl zbrodnie (1969) - Kerner's mother
- The Tender Age (1968)
- Zejscie do piekla (1968) - Ewa Boer
- Television Theater (1955–1966) - Charlotta Bell/Barbara
- Marysia i Napoleon (1966) - Anetka Potocka
- Tarpany (1962)
- Awantura O Basie (1959) - Stanislawa Olszanska
- Tinko (1957) - Frau Clary
- Nikodem Dyzma (1956) - Nina Kunicka
- Zaczarowany rower (1955) - Teacher
- Piatka z ulicy Barskiej (1954) - Maria Radziszewska
- Za wami pójda inni... (1949) - Anna

== See also ==
- List of centenarians (actors, filmmakers and entertainers)
