= Katarzyna Łaniewska =

Polish actress (1933–2020)

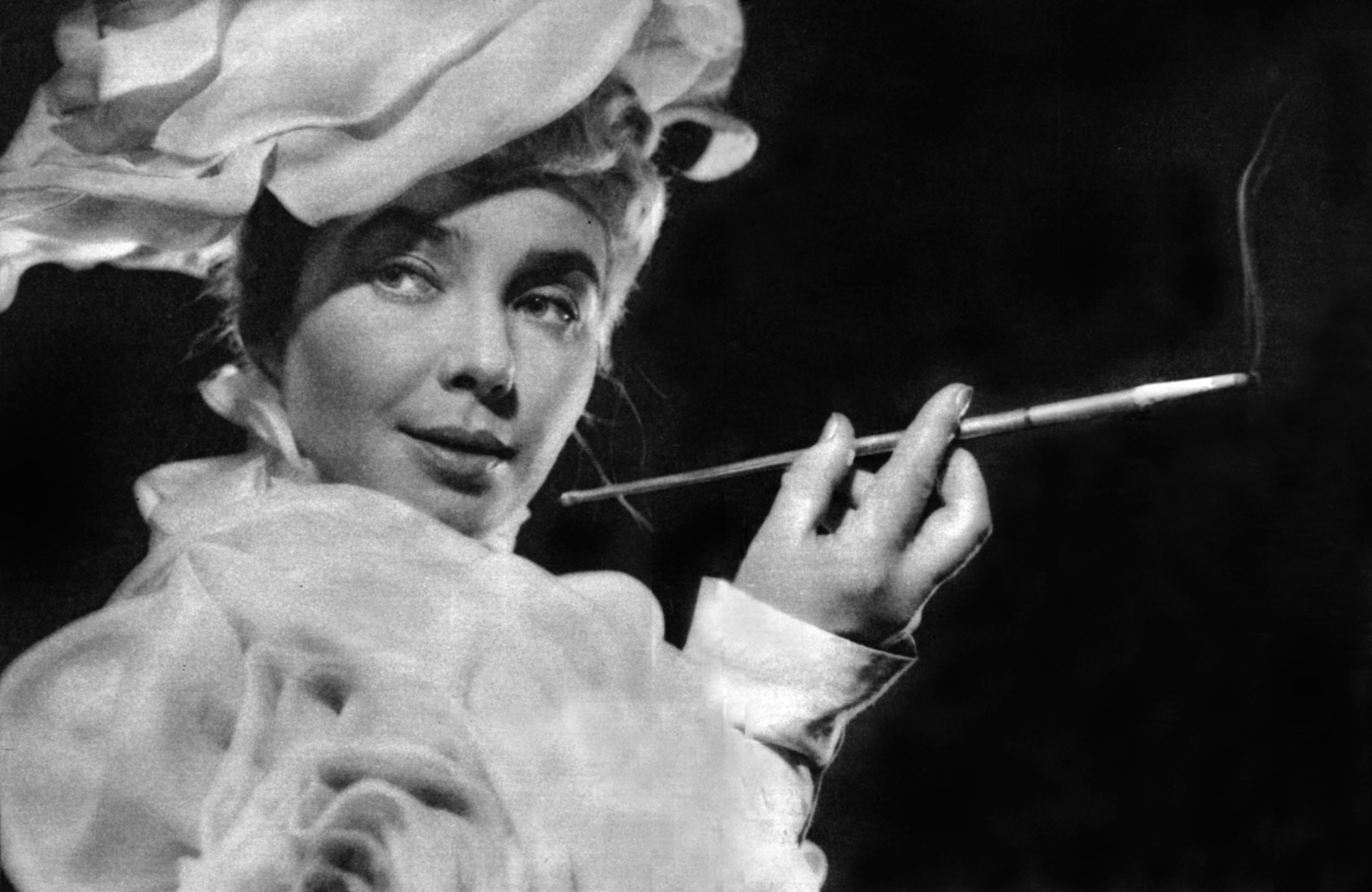
- Katarzyna Łaniewska in 1968
- Born: Katarzyna Janina Łaniewska-Błaszczak; 20 June 1933; Łódź, Poland
- Died: 7 December 2020 (aged 87); Warsaw, Poland
- Education: Theatre Academy in Warsaw
- Occupations: Actress, political activist
- Years active: 1953–2020
- Spouses: Ignacy Gogolewski (m. 1954; div. 1964) Andrzej Błaszczak (m. 1984; died 2018)

Katarzyna Janina Łaniewska-Błaszczak (20 June 1933 – 7 December 2020) was a Polish theatre and film actress, opposition activist in the Polish People's Republic, and a political activist since 1989.

== Biography ==
Both of Katarzyna Łaniewska's parents came from Łódź. Her father was an activist of the co-operative movement and a Polish legionnaire during World War I, who was considered a "dangerous element" by the Nazis and murdered at Auschwitz after he was denounced by a colleague of Belarusian origin. Along with her mother and siblings, she survived the Warsaw Uprising, and was sent to the transit camp in Pruszków. Łaniewska and her family returned to Warsaw on 17 January 1945.

After the war, she joined the "harcerstwo" (polish version of Scouting). In 1955, she graduated from the Theatre Academy in Warsaw, and made her debut in the same year. She was president of the Warsaw branch of the Union of Polish Stage Artists (ZASP) and from 1992 to 2006 served on the Skolimowska Commission of ZASP Board.

By September 2013, she was a columnist of the weekly "W Sieci".

=== Political activities ===
During her studies, she belonged to the socialist Union of Polish Youth, but as she said, "it is not true, as some are trying to insinuate that I managed the ZMP. It was not like [that].". She then belonged to the Polish United Workers' Party.

By the end of the seventies, she became involved with the anti-communist opposition. In 1980, she co-founded a branch of Solidarity at the Ateneum Theatre. She participated in organizing patriotic concerts and the distribution of underground publications. She worked with Jerzy Popiełuszko during this period.

In the Polish parliamentary elections in 2011, Łaniewska was a nonpartisan candidate to the Senate on behalf of the Law and Justice party in Warsaw. She received nearly 100 thousand votes (nearly 31%) and lost to the Civic Platform party's Barbara Borys-Damięcka with almost 197 thousand. She regularly engaged in activities supporting the Law and Justice Party, and was one of the main speakers on behalf of the organizers of the "March of Freedom and Justice" on 13 December 2015.

=== Personal life ===
After her third year of studies, she married Ignacy Gogolewski, with whom she had a daughter, Agnieszka. The marriage broke up after ten years. From 1984 until his death in 2018, her second husband was Andrzej Błaszczak.

== Awards ==
- 1966 – Cross of Merit (Poland)
- 1966 – Nagroda CRZZ
- 1967 – Badge of the 1000th anniversary of the Polish State
- 1970 – Badge for her services for Warsaw
- 1970 – Order of Polonia Restituta
- 1975 – Medal of Merit for National Defence
- 1975 – Badge of Merit by the FJN
- 1998 – Order of Polonia Restituta
- 1999 – Cultural Activist of Merit for publishing the second circulation during the period of martial law* 2006 – Medal for Merit to Culture – Gloria Artis
- 2007 – Order of Polonia Restituta (for "outstanding achievements in business for democratic transformation in Poland, for her involvement in the struggle for freedom of expression and free media, for achievements undertaken for the benefit of the country and social work").

== Theatres ==
- Polish Theatre in Warsaw – 1955–59 and 1983–95
- Drama Theatre in Warsaw – 1959–62 and 1966–77
- National Theatre, Warsaw in Warszawie – 1962–66
- Ateneum Theatre – 1977–83

== Filmography ==
Year	Title	Role	Series
1953	Trzy opowieści	Maryna	political film, staging: Czesław Petelski
1955	Trzy starty	Basia, girlfriend of Walczak	sports film, staging: Czesław Petelski
1956	Nikodem Dyzma	girl next to Poniatowski Bridge	comedy film, staging: Jan Rybkowski
1956	Pożegnanie z diabłem	Bartoszkówna, daughter of mrs. Bartoszek	film sensacyjny, staging: Wanda Jakubowska
1959	Tysiąc talarów	Aniela, girlfriend of Wiesiek	comedy film, staging: Stanisław Wohl
1959	All About Eve	Eva Harrington (Polish dubbing)	film dramatyczny, dubbing and staging: Romuald Drobaczyński
1960	Rok pierwszy	waitress	film wojenny, staging: Witold Lesiewicz
1963	Mój drugi ożenek	Jadźka Kłysowa	film obyczajowy, staging: Zbigniew Kuźmiński
1964	Spotkanie ze szpiegiem	Basia Giedrowska	film sensacyjny, staging: Jan Batory
1964	Przerwany lot	bride	film psychologiczny, staging: Leonard Buczkowski
1965	Trzy kroki po ziemi	mother of sick child	film dramatyczny, staging: Jerzy Hoffman, Edward Skórzewski
1965	Miejsce dla jednego	Sidorowa	film wojenny, staging: Witold Lesiewicz
1965	Dzień ostatni, dzień pierwszy. Nad Odrą	Magda	film obyczajowy, staging: Bohdan Poręba
1966	Sublokator	Kazimiera	comedy film, staging: Janusz Majewski
1968	Molo	Andrew's mother	film psychologiczny, staging: Wojciech Solarz
1969	Zbrodniarz, który ukradł zbrodnię	actress from Dramatic Theatre	film kryminalny, staging: Janusz Majewski
1969	Nowy	Stenia	comedy film, staging: Jerzy Ziarnik
1970	Doktor Ewa	teacher Perkowska (odcinki: 3, 4)	serial telewizyjny, staging: Henryk Kluba
1970	Album polski	wife of Mazur	film obyczajowy, staging: Jan Rybkowski
1970	Abel, twój brat	Eugenia Matulakowa, mother of Karol	film młodzieżowy, staging: Janusz Nasfeter
1971	Złote Koło	Bartoszewska	film kryminalny, staging: Stanisław Wohl
1971	Trochę nadziei	news reporter	film obyczajowy, staging: Julian Dziedzina
1972	Gruby	mother of Gruby (odcinki: 1, 2, 3, 5, 7)	serial telewizyjny, staging: Wojciech Fiwek
1973	Wielka miłość Balzaka	woman's voice (rola Julii Doncourt)	serial telewizyjny, staging: Wojciech Solarz
1974	Urodziny Matyldy	Jadwiga Okoniowa, beaten employee	film psychologiczny, staging: Jerzy Stefan Stawiński
1974	Tylko się jeździ	mother of Michał	film obyczajowy, staging: Leokadia Migielska
1974	Święty Mikołaj pilnie poszukiwany	mrs Halina, head of an orphanage	comedy film, staging: Krzysztof Gradowski
1974	Koniec babiego lata	Kozłowa, mother of Józek	film obyczajowy, staging: Ewa Kruk
1974	Awans	Grzybicha, mother of Marian	comedy film, staging: Janusz Zaorski
1975	Czterdziestolatek	Katarzyna Maliniakowa (odcinek: 8)	serial telewizyjny, staging: Jerzy Gruza
1976	Motylem jestem, czyli romans 40-latka	Katarzyna Maliniakowa	comedy film, staging: Jerzy Gruza
1978	Ty pójdziesz górą - Eliza Orzeszkowa	Franciszka Pawłowska, mother of Eliza Orzeszkowa	film biograficzny, staging: Leszek Orlewicz
1979	Ja, Klaudiusz (serial 1976)	Kamilla (Polish dubbing)	serial telewizyjny, dubbing staging: Izabella Falewiczowa
1979	Godzina "W"	mother of Jacek	film wojenny, staging: Janusz Morgenstern
1980	Grzechy dzieciństwa	washer girl	film młodzieżowy, staging: Krzysztof Nowak-Tyszowiecki
1980	Dzień Wisły	fugitive	film wojenny, staging: Tadeusz Kijański
1981	Mężczyzna niepotrzebny!	mother of Małgosia	film psychologiczny, staging: Laco Adamík
1981	Fik-Mik	cloakroom woman, Kasia	film obyczajowy, staging: Marek Nowicki
1982	Przesłuchanie	head of an orphanage	film psychologiczny, staging: Ryszard Bugajski
1982	Popielec	Hladiczka	serial telewizyjny, staging: Ryszard Ber
1986	Tulipan	mother of Jurek (odcinek: 1)	serial telewizyjny, staging: Janusz Dymek
1987	Słońce w gałęziach	woman	film psychologiczny, staging: Ludmiła Niedbalska
1987–91	Smerfy	Hogata (Polish dubbing)	serial animowany, dubbing and staging: Maria Piotrowska
1988	Pożegnanie cesarzy	Hanka, daughter of Tomasz	film dramatyczny, staging: Roman Załuski
1988	Kogel-mogel	Solska	comedy film, staging: Roman Załuski
1989	Galimatias, czyli kogel-mogel II	Solska	comedy film, staging: Roman Załuski
1990	Amerykańska opowieść	Mame (Polish dubbing)	film animowany, dubbing and staging: Barbara Sołtysik
1990	Kacze opowieści	mrs Dziobek (Polish dubbing)	serial animowany, dubbing and staging: Maria Piotrowska, Miriam Aleksandrowicz
1990	Kacze opowieści. Poszukiwacze zaginionej lampy	mrs Dziobek (Polish dubbing)	film animowany, dubbing and staging: Maria Piotrowska
1990	W labiryncie	Robakowa, the kidnapper's mother	serial telewizyjny, staging: Paweł Karpiński
1990	Pogrzeb kartofla	Mazurkowa	film obyczajowy, staging: Jan Jakub Kolski
1990	Korczak	worker in an orphanage Korczaka	film biograficzny, staging: Andrzej Wajda
1990	Urodziny Kaja	Magdalena's mother	comedy film, staging: Lone Scherfig
1991	Niech żyje miłość	Wanda Korebowa	film, staging: Ryszard Ber
1992	Pierścionek z orłem w koronie	woman	film wojenny, staging: Andrzej Wajda
1993	Nowe przygody Arsena Lupin	wife of majordomus (odcinek: La tabatiere de l'empereur)	serial telewizyjny, staging: Alain Nahum
1993	Dwa księżyce	Wojtalikowa	film poetycki, staging: Andrzej Barański
1993	Czterdziestolatek. 20 lat później	Katarzyna Maliniakowa (odcinek: 5)	serial telewizyjny, staging: Jerzy Gruza
1994	Dzielny Agent Kaczor	director of an orphanage Kwasi (Polish dubbing)	serial animowany, dubbing and staging: Maria Piotrowska
1994	Ptaszka	Klimowa, sąsiadka Lipeckich	film obyczajowy, staging: Krystyna Krupska-Wysocka
1994	Królestwo Zielonej Polany	voice	film animowany, staging: Barbara Sołtysik, Krzysztof Kiwerski
1995	Jeszcze bardziej zgryźliwi tetrycy	Mamme (Polish dubbing)	film dramatyczny, dubbing and staging: Elżbieta Jeżewska
1996	101 Dalmatians	the nanny (Polish dubbing)	film animowany, dubbing and staging: Ewa Złotowska
1996	Maszyna zmian. Nowe przygody	woźna (odcinek: 3)	serial telewizyjny, staging: Andrzej Maleszka
1997	Taekwondo	aunt of Michał	film kryminalny, staging: Moon Seung-wook
1997	W krainie Władcy Smoków	Elin (odcinki: 16, 17, 18, 26)	serial telewizyjny, staging: Noel Price
1997	Świat królika Piotrusia i jego przyjaciół	(Polish dubbing)	serial animowany, dubbing and staging: Barbara Sołtysik
1997	Historie miłosne	matka Filipa	film obyczajowy, staging: Jerzy Stuhr
1997	Dom	wife of Sochejka (odcinek: 17)	serial telewizyjny, staging: Jan Łomnicki
1997	Królestwo Zielonej Polany. Powrót	głos	film animowany, staging: Barbara Sołtysik, Krzysztof Kiwerski
1997–2001	Klan	Helena Małek, mother of Grażyna Lubicz	serial telewizyjny, staging: różni
1998	Miodowe lata	neighbour (odcinek: 13)	serial telewizyjny, staging: Maciej Wojtyszko
1999	Mickey: Bajkowe święta	(Polish dubbing)	film animowany, dubbing and staging: Jerzy Dominik
1999	Tygrysy Europy	teacher	serial telewizyjny, staging: Jerzy Gruza
2000–12	Plebania	Józefina Lasek, the priest's housekeeper	serial telewizyjny, staging: różni
2001	Przedwiośnie (film)	servant Gajcowa	film kostiumowy, staging: Filip Bajon
2002	Przedwiośnie (serial telewizyjny)	servant Gajcowa (odcinki: 1, 3)	serial telewizyjny, staging: Filip Bajon
2003	101 dalmatyńczyków II. Londyńska przygoda	the nanny (Polish dubbing)	film animowany, dubbing and staging: Joanna Wizmur
2004	City	housekeeper	film obyczajowy, staging: Maciej Odoliński
2004–10	Ziarno	granny	program religijny, staging: Józef Mika
2012	Ojciec Mateusz	moter of Fabisiak (odcinek: 107)	serial telewizyjny, staging: Wojciech Nowak
2014	Na dobre i na złe	Maria Szewczyk (odcinek: 559)	serial telewizyjny, staging: Agnieszka Smoczyńska
2016	Smoleńsk	Anna Walentynowicz	film drama series, staging: Antoni Krauze

== Bibliography ==
- Nota biograficzna w Encyklopedii Solidarności
