= Three Stories =

Three Stories may refer to:

- "Three Stories" (House), an episode of the TV series House
- Three Stories (1997 film), a Russian-Ukrainian comedy film
- Three Stories (1953 film), a Polish drama film
