= Paluszkiewicz =

Paluszkiewicz is a Polish surname. Notable people with the surname include:

- Janusz Paluszkiewicz (1912–1990), Polish actor
- Xavier Paluszkiewicz (born 1972), French politician
