= Three Stories (1953 film) =

1953 film by Czesław Petelski

- Directed by: Konrad Nalecki; Ewa Petelska; Czesław Petelski
- Written by: Bohdan Czeszko; Ewa Petelska; Czeslaw Petelski; Andrzej Wajda
- Cinematography: Zbigniew Czajkowski; Jerzy Lipman; Stefan Matyjaszkiewicz; Czeslaw Swirta
- Edited by: Joanna Rojewska
- Music by: Tomasz Kiesewetter
- Production companies: Panstwowa Wyzsza Szkola Filmowa, Telewizyjna i Teatralna; Wytwórnia Filmów Fabularnych
- Release date: 24 April 1953
- Running time: 99 minutes
- Country: Poland
- Language: Polish

Three Stories (Polish: Trzy opowiesci) is a 1953 Polish drama film directed by Konrad Nalecki, Ewa Petelska and Czesław Petelski. It is an anthology film, with three separate stories by different directors and casts. It was made in the style of socialist realism, at a time when this Stalinist method was at its height in Polish and Eastern European cinema.

The film's sets were designed by Wojciech Krysztofiak.

== Cast ==
- Marian Rułka as Wladek Kulesza (segment "Cement")
- Zygmunt Listkiewicz as Stefan 'Franek' Korsak (segment "Cement")
- Adam Kwiatkowski as Wacek (segment "Cement")
- Ignacy Gogolewski as Derka (segment "Cement")
- Władysław Staszewski as Molenda (segment "Cement")
- Henryk Dudziński as Lt. Malewicz (segment "Cement")
- Juliusz Lubicz-Lisowski as Engineer (segment "Cement")
- Wiktor Sadecki as Nowak (segment "Cement")
- Szczepan Baczyński as Director (segment "Cement")
- Roman Kłosowski as Boy-Scout (segment "Cement")
- Leon Luszczewski as Old Man (segment "Cement")
- Marian Stanisławski as Boy-Scout (segment "Cement")
- Antoni Wichura as Worker (segment "Cement")
- Julian Wroczyński as Railwayman (segment "Cement")
- Teresa Szmigielówna as Nurse (segment "Cement")
- Lech Pietrasz as Jacek Kowalski (segment "Jacek")
- Tomasz Zaliwski as Jedrek (segment "Jacek")
- Bogumił Kobiela as Grzes (segment "Jacek")
- Jan Bratkowski as Stefan Makowski (segment "Jacek")
- Antoni Lewek as Kuzma (segment "Jacek")
- Jerzy Kaczmarek as Hooligan (segment "Jacek")
- Ryszard Karpiński as Party Boy (segment "Jacek")
- Zbigniew Korepta as Party Boy (segment "Jacek")
- Stanisław Michalski as Adam (segment "Jacek")
- Roman Polanski as Genek 'The Little' (segment "Jacek")
- Irena Szramowska as Party Girl (segment "Jacek")
- Ryszard Ostromecki as Party Boy (segment "Jacek")
- Ferdynand Matysik as Adam (segment "Sprawa konia")
- Kazimierz Sus as Kazik Martyniak (segment "Sprawa konia")
- Katarzyna Laniewska as Maryna (segment "Sprawa konia")
- Wanda Szczepańska as Wierzbicka (segment "Sprawa konia")
- Józef Pilarski as Wojciech Wierzbicki (segment "Sprawa konia")
- Kazimierz Opaliński as Nowicki (segment "Sprawa konia")
- Janina Draczewska as Bobrowa (segment "Sprawa konia")
- Jerzy Antczak as Rafal (segment "Sprawa konia")
- Włodzimierz Kwaskowski as Karolak (segment "Sprawa konia")
- Stanisław Libner as Clerk (segment "Sprawa konia")
- Jan Machulski as Boy-Scout (segment "Sprawa konia")

== Bibliography ==
- Mark Betz. Beyond the Subtitle: Remapping European Art Cinema. University of Minnesota Press, 2009.
