= Lewek =

Lewek is a surname. Notable people with the surname include:

- Antoni Lewek (1940–2010), Polish Roman Catholic priest, theologian, and academic
- Kathryn Lewek (born 1983), American opera singer
- Michał Lewek (1878–1967), Polish Roman Catholic priest and activist
