= Before Twilight =

- Directed by: Jacek Bławut
- Written by: Jacek Bławut; Stanisław Józefowicz
- Produced by: Anna Mazurkiewicz
- Cinematography: Wojciech Staroń
- Edited by: Jarosław Kamiński, Jacek Bławut
- Release dates: 16 September 2008 (Gdynia Polish Film Festival); 15 May 2009 (Poland)
- Running time: 96 minutes
- Country: Poland
- Language: Polish

Before Twilight (Polish: Jeszcze nie wieczór) is a 2008 Polish comedy drama film directed by Jacek Bławut.

The film is about a group of old retired theatre actors in a retirement home for actors who aim to regroup and stage Goethe's Faust. The film stars a number of esteemed veteran Polish actors including Irena Kwiatkowska and Roman Kłosowski, who plays Nostradamus.

The film, produced in 2008, was featured at the 2008 Polish Feature Film Festival where it won a Silver Lion award for director Jacek Bławut and picked up several other awards. It was later released theatrically in Poland on 15 May 2009.

The Gothenburg Symphony Orchestra were invited to perform part of the soundtrack.

== Plot ==
Goethe's Faust will be staged by a group of renowned retired actors. The Retirement Home for Actors' daily routine is disrupted by their efforts to realize the ideal, revealing the delight of returning to the stage.

== Cast ==
- Nina Andrycz as herself
- Maria Białkowska as Zosia
- Sonia Bohosiewicz as Malgorzata
- Stefan Burczyk as Sodolski
- Wieńczysław Gliński as himself
- Witold Gruca as himself
- Lech Gwit as Henryk
- Robert Jurczyga as Czarek
- Fabian Kiebicz as Fred
- Roman Kłosowski as Nostradamus
- Ewa Krasnodębska as Marilyn
- Irena Kwiatkowska as herself
- Bożena Mrowińska as Renata
- Jan Nowicki as Jerzy
- Kazimierz Orzechowski as himself
- Antoni Pawlicki as Student
- Zofia Perczyńska as Matylda
- Marek Sitarski as Gardener Stefan
- Witold Skaruch as John
- Anna Grażyna Suchocka
- Danuta Szaflarska as Barbara
- Teresa Szmigielówna as Teresa
- Beata Tyszkiewicz as Róza
- Zofia Wilczyńska as Dorota
- Bohdan Wróblewski as Tyka

The idea was to gather an all-star cast of veteran actors, including those who starred in movies or stage plays as early as before World War II. Unfortunately the movie suffered from such a long pre-production phase that many of the actors already cast had passed before the shooting started, with such notable names as Leon Niemczyk, Gustaw Holoubek, Lidia Wysocka, Irena Malkiewicz, Zdzisław Mrożewski. This led to major changes in the script.

== See also ==
- List of Polish films of the 2000s
