= Karol Chodura =

Polish cinematographer and assistant director

- Born: 9 September 1921; Cieszyn, Poland
- Died: 22 March 2001 (aged 79); Warsaw, Poland
- Education: National Film School in Łódź
- Occupations: Cinematographer, First Assistant Director
- Years active: 1945–1989
- Parent: Emil Chodura

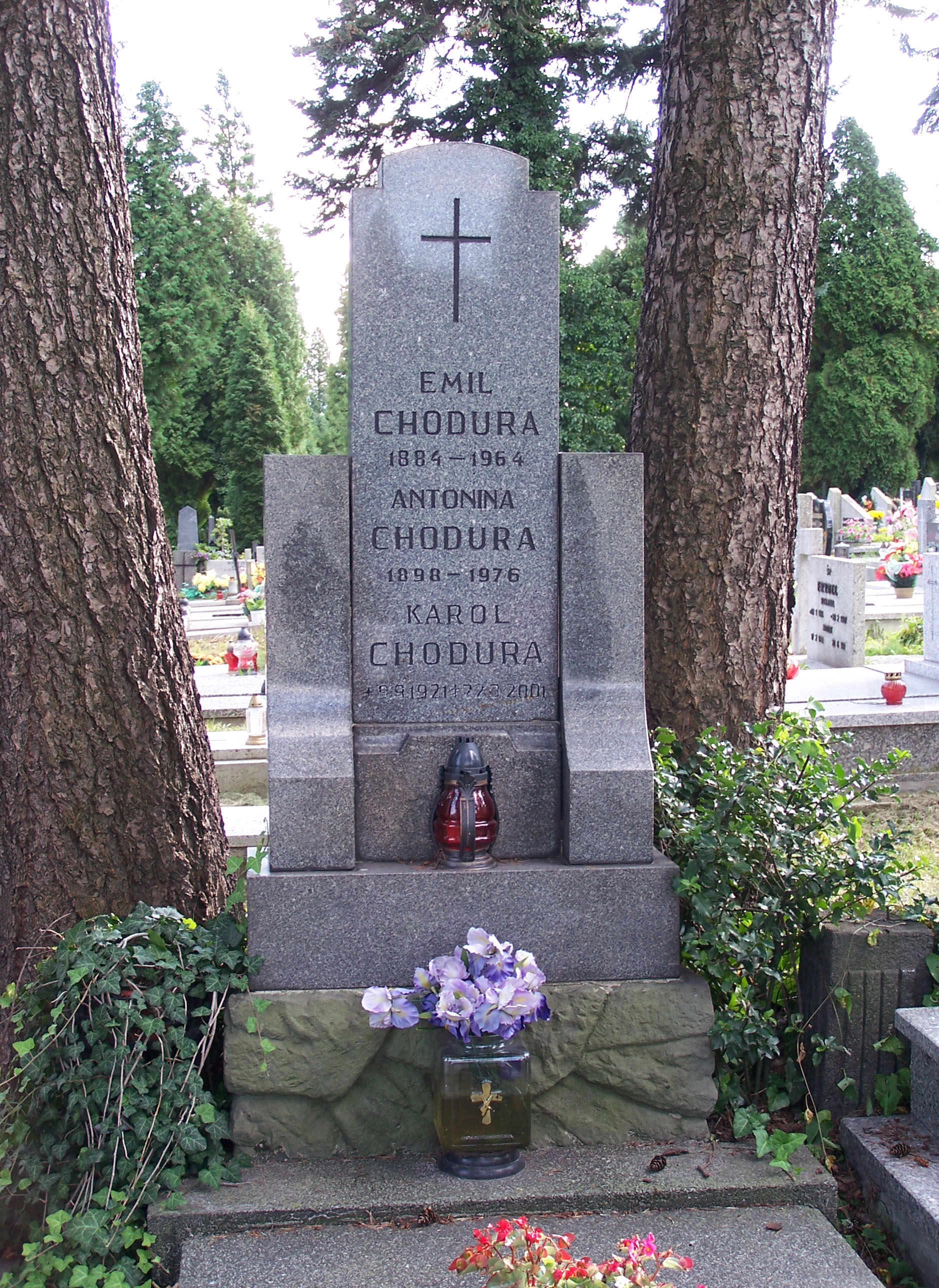
Grave of Karol Chodura at the Communal Cemetery in Cieszyn

Karol Chodura (9 September 1921 - 22 March 2001) is a Polish cinematographer and first assistant director. He was a graduate of National Film School in Łódź.

== Filmography ==
=== Cinematographer ===
- Little Dramas (1960)
- The Wrecks (1957)
- Five Boys from Barska Street (1954)
- Peace Will Overcome (1951) (documentary)

=== Camera operator ===
- Boomerang (1966)
- The Last Stage (1947)
- Forbidden Songs (1947)

=== First assistant director ===
- On the Silver Globe (1988)
- Smaller Sky (1980)
- Die Buddenbrooks (1979)
- Man – Woman Wanted (1973)
- Knights of the Teutonic Order (1960)
