= Hotel klasy lux =

- Directed by: Ryszard Ber
- Written by: Michał Jagiełło
- Cinematography: Zdzisław Kaczmarek
- Edited by: Alina Faflik
- Music by: Piotr Marczewski
- Release date: 1979
- Country: Poland
- Language: Polish

Hotel klasy lux is a 1979 film directed by Ryszard Ber and written by Michał Jagiełło, based on Jagiełło's novel of the same title.

== Cast ==
Source.

- Ignacy Gogolewski as Satała, former municipal secretary of the PZPR (Polish United Workers' Party)
- Maciej Góraj as Tadeusz Sobol, municipal secretary of the PZPR
- Krzysztof Kolberger as Michał Wojtan, a journalist
- Piotr Garlicki as Piotr Komorowski, hotel director
- Zygmunt Hübner as "The Old Man" ("Stary"), a PZPR secretary
- Wacław Ulewicz as Klonowicz, a long-serving party official
- Emilia Krakowska Irena, Wojtan’s lover
- Henryk Bista as Henryk Jakubik, director of the hotel construction project

== Bibliography ==
- Lubelski, Tadeusz (2008). "Kino partyjnej kontrofensywy". Historia kina polskiego. Twórcy, filmy, konteksty. Katowice: Videograf II. pp. 414–415.
