= Małgosia Piekarska =

Polish actress (born 1954)

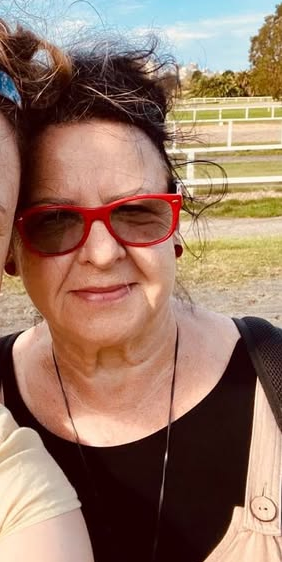
- Maggie Piekarska-Narkiewicz (before 2022)
- Born: 14 June 1954; Poland
- Died: 8 August 2022 (aged 68); Australia
- Other name: Małgosia or Maggie

Małgorzata Piekarska (14 June 1954 – 8 August 2022) was a Polish actress. She was cast in five movies during the late 1950s and early 1960s, among which her most popular role is the main character in "Awantura o Basię" movie from 1959. At those times, Piekarska did couple of "kind-of social commercials". She has lived in Australia for most of her life.

== Filmography ==
1963 - Kryptonim nektar as Zuzka Siennicka
1962 - Spotkanie w Bajce

1960 - Szatan z siódmej klasy as Basia Cisowska
1960 - Marysia i krasnoludki as Marysia
1959 - Awantura o Basię as Basia Bzowska
