= Karol Adwentowicz =

Polish actor and theater director (1871–1958)

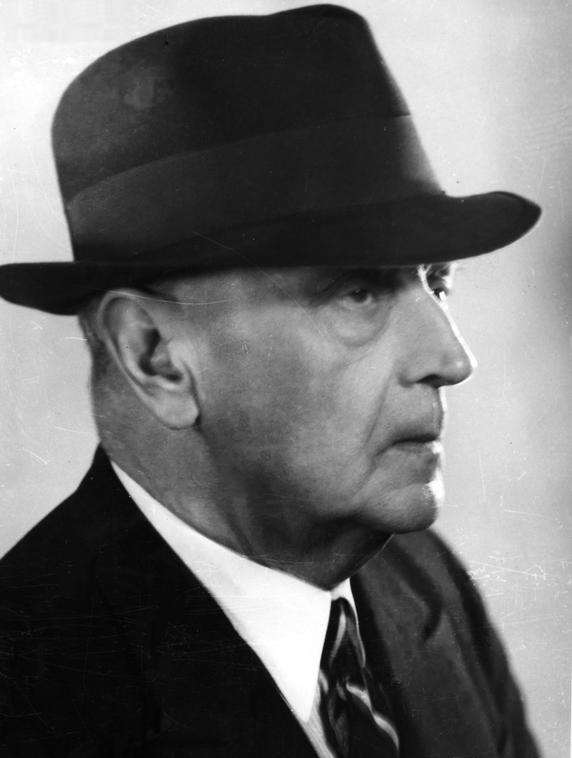
- Born: Karol Adwentowicz; 19 October 1871; Waligora, Poland
- Died: 19 July 1958 (aged 86); Warsaw, Poland
- Occupation: Actor

Karol Adwentowicz (19 October 1871 – 19 July 1958) was a Polish actor and theater director. Adwentowicz fought in the Polish Legions in World War I, and upon the return of Poland's sovereignty, embarked on a hugely successful touring career across the country. During the Nazi occupation of Poland he was imprisoned in Pawiak. He died in Warsaw, two years after the Polish October.

Adwentowicz directed plays and performed in several theaters both before and during the war, including at the Słowacki Theatre in Kraków in 1912 commissioned by Ludwik Solski. In the interwar Poland he ran the experimental Ateneum Theatre in Warsaw along with Stefan Jaracz (1933–34 season), but also founded the Teatr Kameralny in the city. Adwentowicz was one of the most recognized dramatic actors in contemporary Poland, particularly for his role as Hamlet.

== Filmography ==
Year	Film	Role	Notes
1912	Pomszczona krzywda		
1934	Przeor Kordecki – obrońca Częstochowy	Augustyn Kordecki	
