= Five Boys from Barska Street =

1954 Polish film

- Directed by: Aleksander Ford
- Written by: Aleksander Ford; Kazimierz Koźniewski
- Based on: Piątka z ulicy Barskiej by Kazimierz Koźniewski
- Starring: Aleksandra Śląska
- Cinematography: Karol Chodura; Jaroslav Tuzar
- Edited by: Halina Kubik; Wieslawa Otocka
- Release date: 27 February 1954
- Running time: 108 minutes
- Country: Poland
- Language: Polish

Five Boys from Barska Street (Polish: Piątka z ulicy Barskiej) is a 1954 Polish drama film directed by Aleksander Ford, based on the 1952 novel of the same name by Kazimierz Koźniewski. It was awarded the International Prize at the 1954 Cannes Film Festival.

== Plot ==
Five young men have lost their ideals during the Nazi occupation. They then decided to make a living by stealing. After they have been caught and convicted they decided to become a legitimate crime organisation. In the process they get themselves in a lot of trouble including getting unwittingly involved in terrorism activities.

== Cast ==
- Aleksandra Śląska - Hanka
- Tadeusz Janczar - Kazek Spokorny
- Andrzej Kozak - Jacek Siwicki
- Tadeusz Łomnicki - Lutek Kozłowski
- Marian Rułka - Zbyszek Moczarski
- Włodzimierz Skoczylas - Franek Kruk
- Mieczysław Stoor - Marek Kozioł
- Jadwiga Chojnacka - Kazek's Aunt
- Maria Kierzkowa - Edwardowa
- Ewa Krasnodebska - Maria Radziszewska
- Zofia Malynicz - Radziszewska
- Hanna Skarzanka - Judge
- Natalia Szymanska - Koziołowa
- Ludwik Benoit - Wojciechowski
