= Awantura o Basię (disambiguation) =

Awantura o Basię (Argument About Basia) is a Polish young adult novel.

Awantura o Basię may also refer to:

- Awantura o Basię (1959 film), Polish 1959 film
- Awantura o Basię (1995 film), Polish 1985 film
- Awantura o Basię (TV series), Polish 1997 TV film series
