= Aleksandra Śląska =

Polish actress (1925–1989)

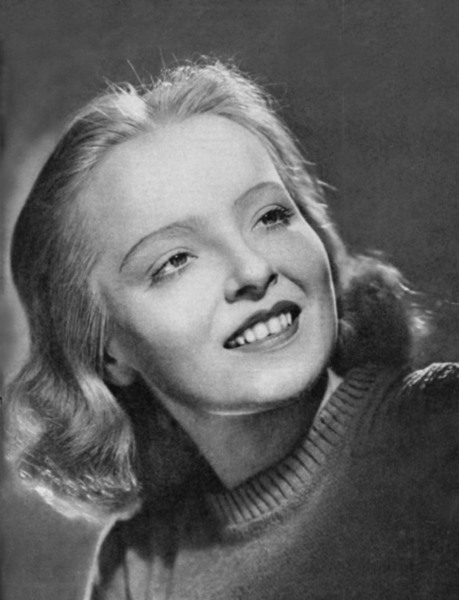
- Born: Aleksandra Wąsik; 4 November 1925; Katowice, Poland
- Died: 18 September 1989 (aged 63); Warsaw, Poland
- Occupation: Actress
- Years active: 1946–1989

Aleksandra Śląska (4 November 1925 – 18 September 1989) was a Polish film actress. She appeared in 18 films between 1948 and 1983. Born in Katowice, Upper Silesia, she left for Warsaw after World War II. She was buried in the Powązki Cemetery in Warsaw.

== Filmography ==
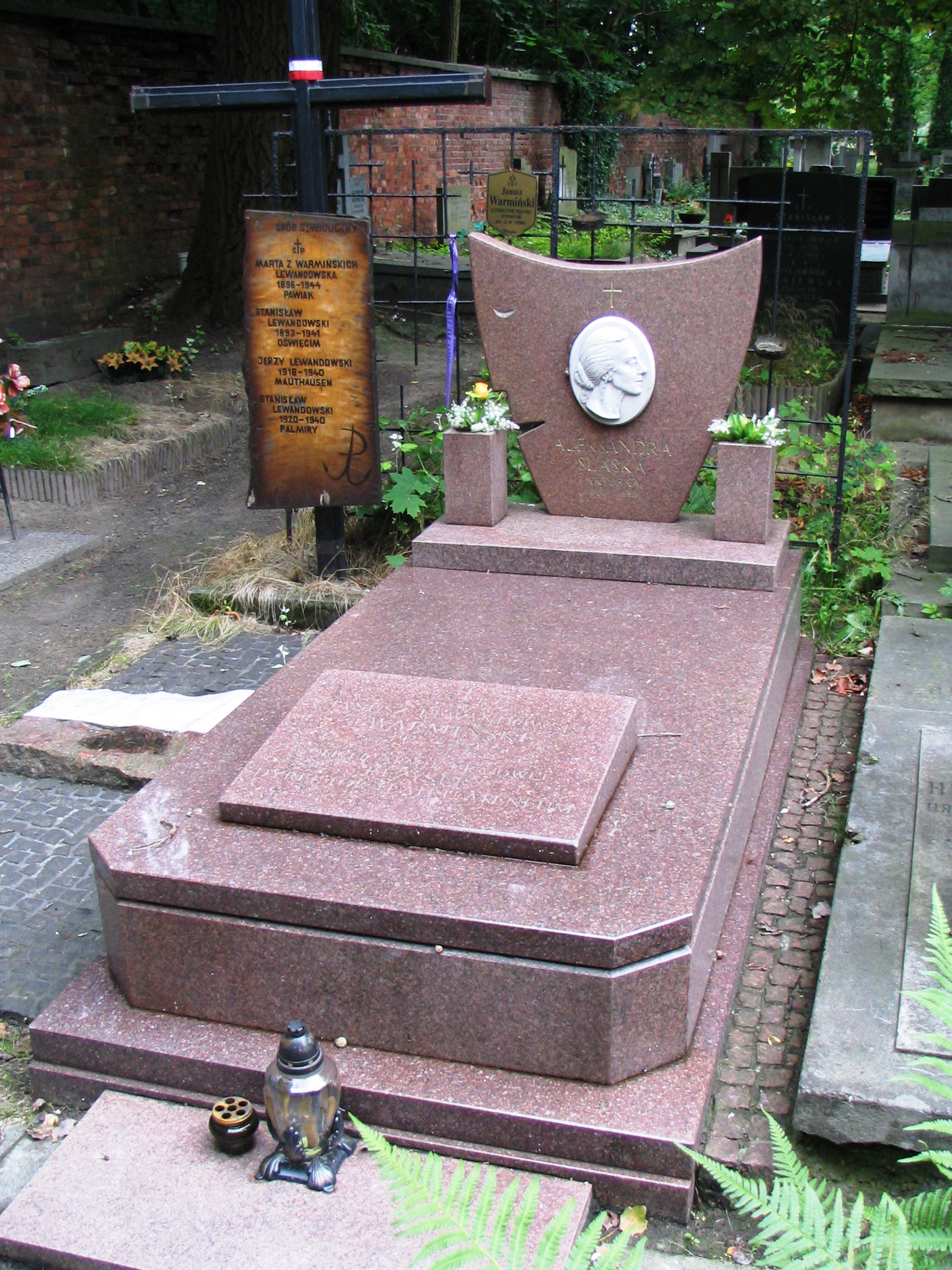
Śląska's grave in the Powązki Cemetery, Warsaw

- The Last Stage (1948, directed by Wanda Jakubowska) as Superintendent of the Women's Block
- Dom na pustkowiu (1949, directed by Jan Rybkowski) as Basia
- The Sonnenbrucks (1951, directed by Georg C. Klaren) as Fanchette
- Youth of Chopin (1952, directed by Aleksander Ford) as Konstancja Gladkowska
- Autobus odjezdza 6.20 (1954, directed by Jan Rybkowski) as Krystyna Poradzka
- Five Boys from Barska Street (1954, directed by Aleksander Ford) as Hanka
- Pętla (aka The Noose) (1958, directed by Wojciech Jerzy Has) as Krystyna
- Rok pierwszy (1960, directed by Witold Lesiewicz) as Dorota
- Historia wspólczesna (1961, directed by Wanda Jakubowska) as Jadwiga Bielas
- Spotkanie w "Bajce" (aka Meeting in the Fable) (1962, directed by Jan Rybkowski) as Teresa
- Ich dzien powszedni (1963, directed by Aleksander Ścibor-Rylski) as Nitka
- Passenger (1963, directed by Andrzej Munk) as Liza
- Mansarda (1963, directed by Konrad Nałęcki) as Maria
- Boleslaw Smialy (1972, directed by Witold Lesiewicz) as Queen
- Królowa Bona (1980-1982, TV Series, directed by Janusz Majewski) as Queen Bona Sforza
- Epitafium dla Barbary Radziwiłłówny (1983, directed by Janusz Majewski) as Queen Bona Sforza d'Aragon

== Awards and decorations ==
=== Decorations ===
- Order of the Banner of Labour, 2nd class (1963)
- Knight's Cross of the Order of Polonia Restituta (19 July 1954)
- Medal of the 10th Anniversary of People's Poland (1955)
- Badge of the Millennium of the Polish State (1967)
- Badge of the honorary title "Meritorious for National Culture" (1989)
- "Meritorious Cultural Activist" badge (1967)
- Honorary badge "For Merits to Warsaw" (1966)

=== Awards ===
- 1950 – State Artistic Award, 3rd class, in the cinematography category, for her performance as the protagonist of the film Dom na pustkowiu
- 1954 – Distinction at the Cannes Film Festival for Piątka z ulicy Barskiej
- 1955 – State Prize of Poland, 2nd class, in the film category, for her film roles during the preceding ten years
- 1964 – State Prize, 2nd class, for outstanding acting achievements, particularly for her roles as Inga in First Day of Freedom, Joanna in The Prisoner of Altona, and in the film The Passenger
- 1964 – Award from the Committee for Radio and Television for her performances in Jerzy Broszkiewicz's television play Skandal w Hellbergu and the melodrama Pomyłka, proszę się wyłączyć
- 1967 – Capital City of Warsaw Award
- 1967 – Best Actress award at the 4th International Television Festival in Prague, for her role as Joanna in the film Czarna suknia
- 1968 – Award from the Committee for Radio and Television for her performance in the television production Mazepa
- 1975 – Złoty Ekran award for her roles in the television theatre productions Hedda Gabler and Sława i chwała
- 1978 – Theatre Award from the weekly Przyjaźń for her role as Arkadina in Anton Chekhov's The Seagull at the Stefan Jaracz Ateneum Theatre in Warsaw
- 1982 – First-class award (collective) from the chairman of the Committee for Radio and Television for acting achievements, particularly for her portrayal of the historical figure Bona Sforza in the television series Queen Bona
- 1985 – Award at the 11th Opole Theatre Festival for the title role in Witkacy's The Mother at the Stefan Jaracz Ateneum Theatre in Warsaw
- 2 December 2013 – Posthumously awarded the title "Heroine of Polish Cinema" on the initiative of the Union of Polish Stage Artists (ZASP)
