= A Generation =

- Directed by: Andrzej Wajda
- Written by: Bohdan Czeszko
- Produced by: Ignacy Taub
- Starring: Tadeusz Łomnicki; Urszula Modrzyńska; Roman Polanski
- Cinematography: Jerzy Lipman
- Edited by: Czesław Raniszewski
- Music by: Andrzej Markowski
- Production company: KADR
- Release date: 25 January 1955
- Running time: 83 minutes
- Country: Poland
- Language: Polish

A Generation (Polish: Pokolenie) is a 1955 Polish film directed by Andrzej Wajda. It is based on the novel Pokolenie by Bohdan Czeszko, who also wrote the script. It was Wajda's first film and the opening installment of what became his Three War Films trilogy set in the Second World War, to be followed by Kanał and Ashes and Diamonds.

== Plot ==
A Generation is set in Wola, a working-class section of Warsaw, in 1942 and tells the stories of two young men at odds with the German occupation of Poland. The young protagonist, Stach (Tadeusz Łomnicki), is living in squalor on the outskirts of the city and carrying out wayward acts of theft and rebellion.

After a friend is killed attempting to heist coal from a German supply train, he finds work as an apprentice at a furniture workshop, where he becomes involved in an underground communist resistance cell. He is guided first by a friendly journeyman there, who in turn introduces Stach to the beautiful Dorota (Urszula Modrzyńska). An outsider, Jasio Krone (Tadeusz Janczar), the temperamental son of an elderly veteran, is initially reluctant to join the struggle but finally commits himself, running relief operations in the Jewish ghetto during the uprising there.

== Cast ==
- Tadeusz Łomnicki as Stach Mazur
- Urszula Modrzyńska as Dorota
- Tadeusz Janczar as Jasio Krone
- Janusz Paluszkiewicz as Sekuła
- Ryszard Kotys as Jacek (credited as Ryszard Kotas)
- Roman Polanski as Mundek

== Production ==
“For us, it was a film of tremendous importance. The whole Polish cinema began with it. It was a marvelous experience. The whole crew was very young. Wajda was very young, very sincere...We believed in what we were doing - this was something utterly new in Poland...” —Filmmaker and actor Roman Polanski on A Generation in Hadelin Trinon, 1964

“A Generation featured the first documented use of squibs to simulate bullet impacts in films. For the first time, audiences were presented with a realistic representation of a bullet impacting an on-camera human being, complete with blood spatter. The creator of the effect, Kazimierz Kutz, used a condom with fake blood and dynamite.

The first film of Wajda's “famous war trilogy”, A Generation, was his debut directorial effort at age twenty-seven. Under the influence of the Italian neorealists, Wajda and his production team routinely shot outdoor sequences in less than optimal light and weather conditions, violating earlier Polish production precepts. Wajda recalled:

As we saw it, the studio footage was only meant to round off what we shot on location. For the first time in a Polish film, you saw scenes played in the rain or under a cloudy sky; all this had, for aesthetic or technical reasons, previously been anathema.”

Because at the time it wasn't possible to adapt machine guns to shoot blanks, all shots of automatic weapons were done with live ammunition shot into sandbags off-screen.

A Polish film production executive reviewing the completed film was troubled by some of the brutal depictions of violence, and additionally, that the hero is portrayed as a disaffected proletariat. Despite these objections, A Generation was approved for release. It opened in Warsaw on January 25, 1955.

== Critical Assessment ==
Though Wajda would soon be recognized as a leading figure in the Polish Film School, the reaction to his debut picture was “generally cool.” The influence of neorealism was widely noted disapprovingly as a departure from Polish “orthodox cinematic treatments."

Bohdan Czeszko’s autobiographical novel Pokolenie, on which the film is based, concerns his activity in the armed resistance associated with the communist Polish Workers' Party (PPR) against Nazi occupation forces during World War II. Wajda, a member of the PPR since 1948, had at the time of his application to the Łódź Film School in 1950 declared: “Beside talent and a sense of reality, a film director must have a Marxist attitude towards life and art.”

Historians Dorota Niemitz and Stefan Steinberg write:

Many artists, including Wajda, were attracted for a time to socialism and Marxism. However, they faced the difficulty of having to overcome both the Stalinist and nationalist ideological pressures of their time...In line with these convictions, Wajda made his directing debut with Generation, about young Communist partisans in Nazi-occupied Warsaw. The partisans are presented in a positive light as opposed to the forces of the pro-bourgeois AK (Home Army)...Wajda was widely criticized by some for accommodating himself to the Stalinist regime.”

Biographer Boleslaw Michalek notes that “in one of the tenants” of the late Stalinist era A Generation depicts Polish nationalists “collaborating almost overtly” with the German occupiers. He adds:

Neither one side or the other [among film critics] were able to see beyond the moods of the moment and recognize the abiding values of A Generation: the depth of the human concern and the freshness and power with which it is communicated. Nor did it dawn on them that from it would come an original artistic growth of great significance.

== DVD ==
A box set of the Three War Films was released by The Criterion Collection. A Generation includes an exclusive interview with the director and film critic Jerzy Płażewski, as well as Wajda's 1951 film school short Ceramics from Iłża (Ceramika Iłżecka), production photos, publicity stills, posters, and original artwork by the director and an essay by film scholar Ewa Mazierska.

== Sources ==
- Michałek, Bolesław (1973). The Cinema of Andrzej Wajda. Tantivy Press, A. S. Barnes and Company. ISBN 978-0-498-01325-6 – via Internet Archive.
