= Kanał =

1957 Polish film

- Polish theatrical release poster
- Directed by: Andrzej Wajda
- Written by: Jerzy Stefan Stawiński
- Starring: Teresa Iżewska; Tadeusz Janczar; Wieńczysław Gliński; Tadeusz Gwiazdowski; Stanisław Mikulski; Emil Karewicz; Maciej Maciejewski; Vladek Sheybal
- Cinematography: Jerzy Lipman
- Edited by: Halina Nawrocka
- Music by: Jan Krenz
- Production company: KADR
- Release date: 1957
- Running time: 95 minutes
- Country: Poland
- Languages: Polish, German

Kanał (Polish pronunciation: [ˈkanaw], The Sewer) is a 1957 Polish war drama film directed by Andrzej Wajda. It was the first film made about the 1944 Warsaw Uprising, telling the story of a group of Polish resistance fighters and civilians trying to escape the Nazi onslaught through the city's sewer system during the fall of the Mokotów district.

Adapted by the uprising veteran Jerzy Stefan Stawiński for the film's screenplay from his own short story, Kanał was the second film of Wajda's War Trilogy, preceded by A Generation and followed by Ashes and Diamonds. The film was the winner of the Special Jury Award at the 1957 Cannes Film Festival.

== Plot ==
It is 25 September 1944, during the last days of the Warsaw Uprising. The film's opening narration tells the viewers to watch closely its characters, for these are the final hours of their lives.

Lieutenant Zadra leads a group of 43 AK soldiers and civilians to a new position amidst the ruins of the now-isolated Mokotów district of Warsaw. The composer Michał manages to telephone his wife and child in another part of the city. Before the line goes dead, she tells him that the Germans are clearing the building and that they are coming for her.

The next morning, Warrant Officer Korab finds the-second-in-command, Lieutenant Mądry, and messenger girl Halinka in bed together (Halinka later reveals that Mądry is her first lover). A German assault is stopped, but Korab is wounded while disabling a Goliath tracked mine.

A model of sewer tunnel segment at the Warsaw Uprising Museum. The writing on the wall warns of the Germans above.

Surrounded by the enemy, Zadra is ordered to retreat through the sewers to the Downtown. Now down to 27 fit to travel, including Korab, they descend into darkness and begin to slog through the filth among rotting corpses and constant threat of German attacks from the surface.

Stokrotka, their guide, asks Zadra to let her help Korab, claiming that the others can find their way easily enough; Zadra consents. However, the pair fall further and further behind. When they reach the designated exit at Wilcza Street, Korab is too weak to climb the upward sloping tunnel, so she decides that they should head in the direction of the river, and drives him on, not letting him stop. Finally, they see sunlight. By this time, Korab is half-blind and at the end of his strength. He cannot see that the exit is closed off by metal bars and they are trapped. Stokrotka finally reveals her feelings for him, kissing him before telling him that he can rest now.

The main group follows Zadra for a while, but they become lost without Stokrotka. Finally, when Zadra tells Sergeant Kula to order them onward after a brief rest, they remain where they are. Kula lies and tells Zadra they are following in order to get him to keep going. Eventually, the only remaining soldier following Zadra and Kula is the mechanic Smukły.

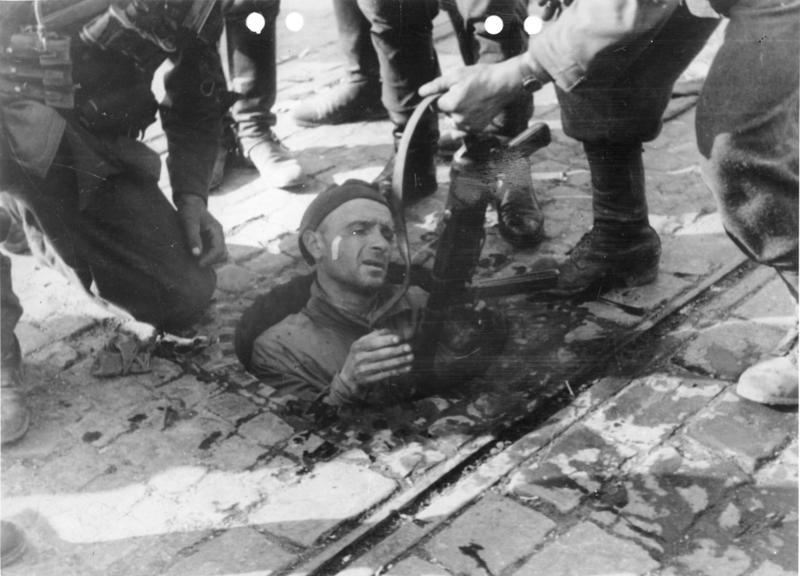
German archival photo of an unidentified insurgent coming out of a Puławska Street manhole and being disarmed by Nazi Schupo policemen prior to his summary execution on 27 September 1944.

Meanwhile, Mądry, Halinka and Michał are also lost in the underground labyrinth. Eventually, Michał loses his mind and wanders away, playing an ocarina. Upon reaching a dead end, Mądry cries out that he has somebody to live for. When Halinka asks who, he tells her that he has a wife and child. She asks him to turn off his flashlight, and then shoots herself. Mądry finds an exit that is not blocked, but as soon as he has climbed out of the sewer he is disarmed by the awaiting Germans and placed into the courtyard along with others who have come through the same manhole. Despondent, he kneels beside the bodies of others who have already been executed.

Zadra, Kula and Smukły also miss the designated exit but find another - however, it is booby trapped. Smukły manages to disarm two grenades but is killed by the third trap. The two survivors emerge exhausted from the sewer to find themselves in a deserted part of the ruined city. When Zadra tells Kula to bring up the rest of the men, Kula admits he lied and that they have left them behind a long time ago. The enraged Zadra shoots Kula dead and, in a daze, heads back down into the sewer.

== Cast ==
- Teresa Iżewska as "Stokrotka" (Daisy)
- Tadeusz Janczar as Chorąży "Korab"
- Wieńczysław Gliński as Lt. "Zadra" (Splinter)
- Tadeusz Gwiazdowski as Sgt. "Kula" (Ball)
- Stanisław Mikulski as "Smukły" (Slim)
- Emil Karewicz as Lt. "Mądry" (Wise)
- Maciej Maciejewski as "Gustaw"
- Vladek Sheybal as Michał, the composer (credited as Władysław Sheybal)
- Teresa Berezowska as Halinka

== Production and release ==
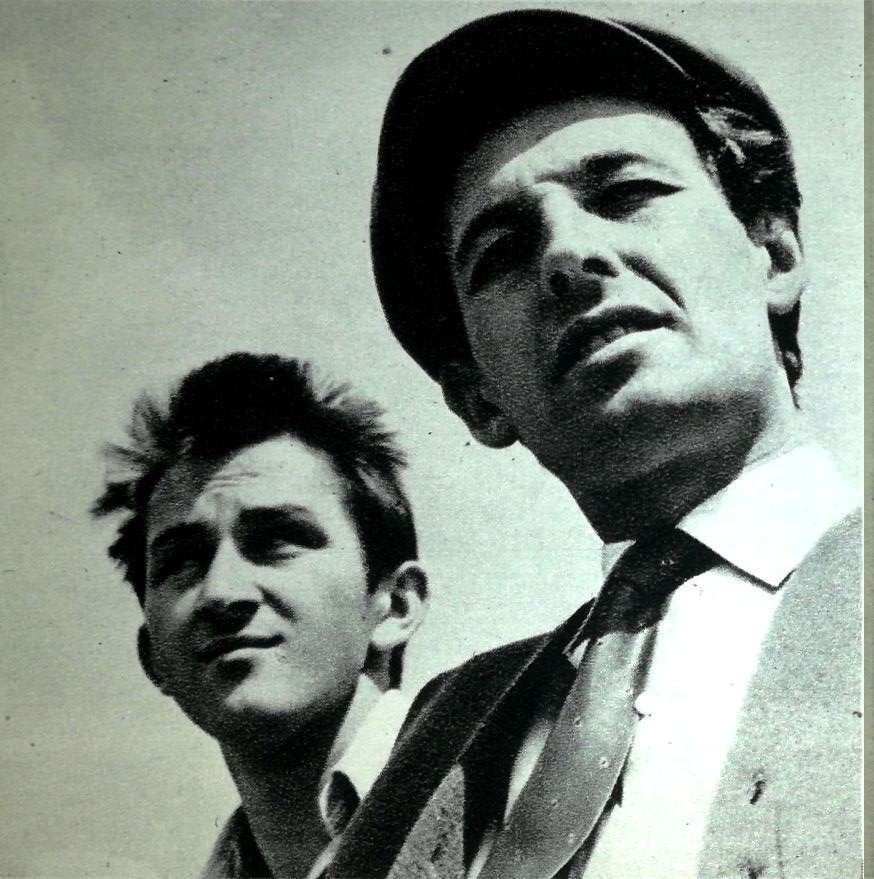
Kazimierz Kutz (assistant director) and Andrzej Wajda (main director) during the filming of Kanał

The story and script were written by Jerzy Stefan Stawiński who himself survived the sewers as an officer of the Polish resistance Armia Krajowa (Home Army) during the uprising. The film was produced by Zespół Filmowy "Kadr" at Wytwornia Filmow Fabularnych (Feature Film Studio) in Łódź. It is largely free of the overt communist propaganda that characterised its predecessor, A Generation, being released after the fall of the Bierut regime after the death of Stalin.

Kanal premiered in Warsaw on April 20, 1957. In April 2019, a restored version of the film was selected to be shown in the Cannes Classics section at the 2019 Cannes Film Festival.

== Reception ==
Kanał earned Wajda the Special Jury Prize at the 1957 Cannes Film Festival. On Rotten Tomatoes, the film holds an approval rating of 100% based on 8 reviews, with a weighted average rating of 8.1/10.

While Wajda's debut film A Generation (1955) received a measured critical response, Kanal provoked widespread controversy and debate among Poles as to its merits. Donota Niemitz and Stefan Steinberg of World Socialist Web Site wrote that "the film was not received favorably in Poland. The futile death of the uprising's heroes, covered in dirt and excrement, did not correspond to the idealized picture of the nation's martyrs." Critic Leon Buko in Dziennik Polski complained, "This whole Warsaw, this whole Rising wallows in filth, in the gutters of history…" Aleksander Jackiewicz, of the Trybuna Ludu wrote: "Maybe Kanał will mark the beginning of the truth being told about history, about ourselves, about a whole generation. Perhaps it will prove to be art as a warning, art of purgation, a triumph of the heroism of life over the heroism of death." Biographer Bolesław Michałek adds that "Jackiewicz placed emphasis on the skeptical note in the film, its confrontation with the legend of the Warsaw Rising, and by and large this was how reviewers hailed Kanał as a landmark in Polish cinema."

== Legacy in Japan ==
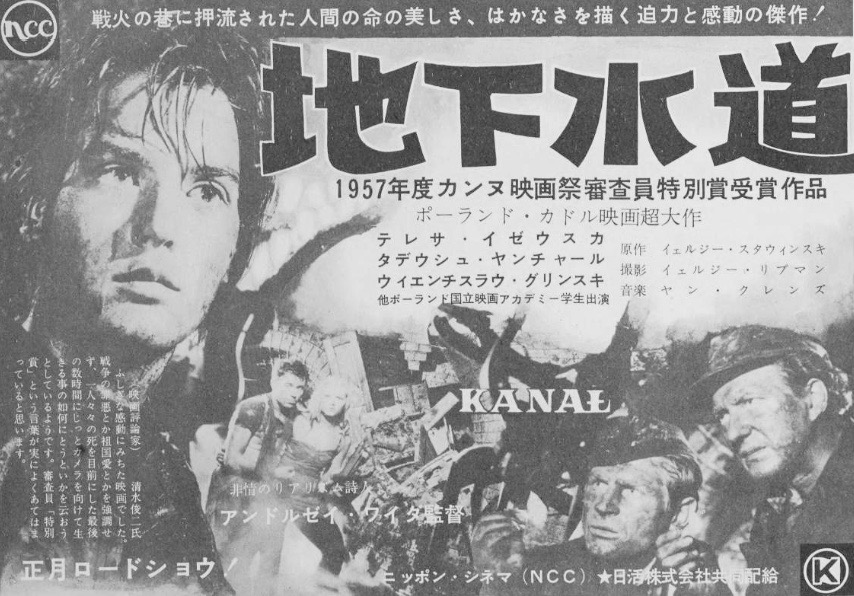
Japanese 1958 theatrical poster

Japanese video game designer Hideo Kojima described it as one of his favourite films that "had a big influence on Metal Gear." Gamera Rebirth is a 2023 Japanese television series with an episode titled after "Kanal" as a homage. Mamoru Oshii's films and screenplays such as Jin-Roh: The Wolf Brigade and Avalon were inspired by Wajda's films, including Kanał.

== Analysis ==
=== Themes ===
One of the principal themes in Kanał is "Polish heroism" and the notion that Poles have historically been prone to "acts of courage as futile as they [were] desperate." Wajda initially considered referencing some celebrated - and semi-suicidal - cavalry charges in Polish history, including those during the Napoleonic era's Battle of Samosierra, the Charge of Rokitna in World War I and the legend of the Charge at Krojanty, reputedly on German tanks in 1939. These were to be presented in a pre-credit sequence of but ultimately were abandoned. Michałek observes: "Here we have a definite comment 'on Polish heroism', an implicit critique of 'Polishness', the lack of political and social common sense, the propensity for disproportionately high sacrifices. According to this line of thinking, national history was one long chain of foolhardiness. 'Historic manifestations of romanticism and heroism' were deemed anachronistic in post-war Poland and challenged by appeals to 'reason' and 'political common sense'. Despite these political exposures, Wajda's romantic, sensual style endows the characters in Kanał with 'heroic dimensions'."

The descent into the sewers has been compared to Dante's depiction of the souls damned in his Inferno, and acknowledged as such by Wajda. Michałek writes: "Kanał is permeated by a virtually unrelieved mood of despair, bitterness and resignation. The whole structure is pivoted on the idea that there is no way out, no hope, no chance of deliverance. As in Dante, there is only a succession of narrowing circles of torment."

=== Political assessment ===
The historical subject that Wajda addressed in Kanał was one of the most politically and socially charged topics in post-war Poland. Michałek wrote: "One must bear in mind that the events in question were charged with controversy. The outbreak of the Rising on August 1, 1944 was ordered by the Home Army leaders in agreement with the Government-in-Exile in London, but no clear understanding was made with the command of the approaching Soviet armies … when a deadlock was reached at the Soviet front, a war of attrition was mounted [by the Nazis] against the insurgents … Gradually, the remorseless German assault forced the insurgents to withdraw to Mokotów. After two months of fighting, the Home Army command surrendered... the price paid for the Rising was several hundred thousand dead and the immolation of the homes of over one million people." Michałek added that "Wajda's treatment of the Warsaw Rising and the retreat through the sewers had a definite and deliberate historical and social edge." In 2016, Niemitz and Steinberg opined the film was "an honest and valuable attempt to portray the complexity of Polish contemporary history and politics."

By the mid-1950s, two fundamental perceptions had become established among Poles regarding the event. One was a popular romantic image of gallant young martyrs who died defending the homeland. The second was official skepticism as to the purity of the high-command's motives in committing men and women patriots to a doomed endeavor.

Wajda, responding to these dual social outlooks, attempted to synthesis these in Kanał. Polish critic Krzysztof Teodor Toeplitz commented on the contrasting "heroic dimensions" of the characters in Kanał and the "latent skepticism" concerning the 1944 uprising: "Like all artists approaching this subject, Wajda has succumbed to certain pressures. On the one hand there was the rational pressure against delivering an 'apologia' for the Rising and, on the other hand, the emotional pressure against taking a merciless criticism of the Rising. The film stopped halfway." Wajda also managed to address the controversial topic of the lack of Soviet Union support for the Polish AK partisans, particularly in the Warsaw Uprising. The topic was not allowed to be openly discussed in communist Poland, where censors would remove such discussion, but "they could not censor the silence", in the context of the movie scene where some civilians, hidden in the canals, await aid from the advancing Red Army, but instead notice the sudden silence, as the Russian artillery stops firing - an implied reference to the abandonment of the inconvenient Polish partisans by the Soviets.

== See also ==
- Cinema of Poland
- List of Polish language films

== Sources ==
- Michałek, Bolesław (1973). The Cinema of Andrzej Wajda. Tantivy Press, A. S. Barnes and Company. ISBN 978-0-498-01325-6 – via Internet Archive.
