= Alina Faflik =

Polish film editor (1929–2017)

- Born: 11 December 1929
- Died: 27 December 2017 (aged 88)
- Occupation: Film editor

Alina Faflik (11 December 1929 – 27 December 2017) was a film editor.

== Biography ==
She was a member of Stowarzyszenie Filmowców Polskich.

== Filmography ==
Source.

- Trzy straty (1955)
- Szczęściarz Antoni (1960)
- Knights of the Teutonic Order (1960)
- Milczące ślady (1961)
- Mężczyźni na wyspie (1962)
- Mój drugi ożenek (1963)
- Godzina pąsowej róży (1963)
- Zakochani są między nami (1964)
- Banda (1964)
- Walkover (1965)
- Zawsze w niedziele (1965)
- Zejście do piekła (1966)
- Piekło i niebo (1966)
- Pan Wołodyjowski (1969)
- Nie ma róży bez ognia (1974)
- The Doll (TV series; 1977)
- Hotel klasy lux (1979)
