= Urszula Modrzyńska =

Polish actress (1928–2010)

- Urszula Modrzyńska in Polish film Nikodem Dyzma (1956)
- Born: Urszula Modrzyńska; 23 February 1928; Srebrniki
- Died: 11 December 2010 (aged 82); Łódź, Poland
- Occupations: Stage and film actor

Urszula Modrzyńska (Polish pronunciation: [urˈʂula mɔdˈʐɨj̃ska]; 23 February 1928 – 11 December 2010) was a Polish stage and film actress.

== Career ==
Modrzyńska began her career on stage on October 4th 1949 in a performance of Okno w lesie at the Ziemi Pomorskiej Theater in Grudziądz, followed by a performance of Wiosna w Norwegii in the same theater the next year. She began performing at the Jaracz Theatre when she moved to Łódź in 1954. In 1961, Kazimierz Dejmek invited her to perform as Irina in a production of Three Sisters at the Łódź Nowy Theater, where she would continue performing for the rest of her career.

She was a part of many productions for Teatrze Telewizji (a Polish channel which broadcasts live television plays), including William Shakespeare's As You Like It in 1963 and Dama pikowa by Alexander Pushkin in 1964. She also had a role in the 1970 live radio performance of Jak wam się podoba Penelopa by Ludwik Morstin.

Modrzyńska had several film roles during the 50s and 60s, the most notable of which being Dorota in Andrzej Wajda's 1955 film Pokolenie by and Jagienka in Krzyżacy by Aleksander Ford in 1960. In addition to her film roles, she performed in several smaller roles in TV series.

In the 1970s she played only smaller parts in movies by young directors, as in Droga w świetle księżyca by Witold Orzechowski (1972), Rozmowa by Piotr Andrejew (1974), and Zdjęcia Próbne by Agnieszka Holland, Paweł Kędzierski and Jerzy Domaradzki (1976), concentrating on her theater work at Nowy Theater in Łódź. Her final show was a production of Zmierzchu at the Nowy Theater in January of 1984.

== Personal life ==
Not much is known about Modrzyńska's personal life, as she kept much out of the public eye. She was married to the actor and director Zbigniew Józefowicz, with whom she had a son named Stanislaus. Immediately after her 1984 production of Zmierzchu, she retired from acting due to an unknown illness which she had been dealing with since 1961. She died on 20 December 2010 in Łódź and was buried at the Doły Municipal Cemetery.

== Stage ==
Year	Title	Role	Notes	Ref(s)
1949	Okno w lesie	Wali		
1950	Wiosna w Norwegii	Sigrid		
1952	Ruchome piaski	Halin		
1953	Grzec	Anna Jaskrowiczówna		
1958	Henry IV	Lady Percy		
1958	Wesele	Bride		
1960	Kordian	Wioletta		
1961	Three Sisters	Irina	First performance at the Nowy Theater	
1962	The Tempest	Iris		
1963	Cyrano de Bergerac	Roksan		
1965	Faust	Marta		
1978	Zwłoce	Rosabert		

== Filmography ==
Year	Title	Role	Notes	Ref(s)
1954	Niedaleko Warszawy	Wanda Bugajówna		
1955	A Generation	Dorota		
1956	Nikodem Dyzma	Zula		
1957	Wraki	Teresa		
1957	Spotkania	Jane		
1958	Deszczowy lipiec	Anna		
1959	Ostatni strzal	Magda		
1960	Knights of the Teutonic Order	Jagienka Zychówna		
1961	Dzis w nocy umrze miasto	Zofia		
1963	Wielka, wieksza i najwieksza	Hanka, mother of Iki		
1969	Przygoda z piosenka	Mascotte		
1973	Jezioro osobliwosci	Mother Michael		
1977	Zdjecia próbne	Anka's mother		
1982	W obronie wlasnej	Lover of Maria's father	(final film role)	

== Television ==
Year	Title	Role	Notes	Ref(s)
1959	Cienie		TV play	
1959	Przy trakcie	Maria Egorovna	TV play	
1960	Warszawianka	Anna	TV play	
1962	Maskarada		TV play	
1963	As You Like It		TV play	
1963	Uczciwa dziewczyna	Bettina	TV play	
1964	Dama pikowa	Liza	TV play	
1966	Niewiarygodne przygody Marka Piegusa	Mrs. Okulusowa	Episode: Przygoda druga czyli niesamowite i niewiarygodne udreki które nawiedzily mnie w klasie	
1969	Zamach		TV play	
1970	Doktor Ewa	Dzidki's mother	Episode: Przeoczenie	
1972	Droga w świetle księżyca	Wandzia's servant	Television film	
1974	Rozmowa	Teacher	Television film	
1974	Siedem stron świata	Mother Czarka	2 episodes	
1975	Lato	Maja	TV play	
1979	Detektywi na wakacjach	Tourist	3 Episodes	
1979	Niewdzięczność	Patient Renata	Television film	
1981	Fantazja dur-moll	Witch's wife	Television film	
1984	Obszar swobody	Klara	TV play	
