= Krzysztof Chamiec =

Polish actor

- Born: 2 February 1930; Andruha, Poland (now Zelene, Ukraine)
- Died: 11 October 2001 (aged 71); Skolimów, Poland
- Occupation: Actor
- Years active: 1962–2001

Krzysztof Chamiec (2 February 1930 – 11 October 2001) was a Polish actor. He appeared in more than 45 films and television shows between 1962 and 2001.

== Selected filmography ==
- Panienka z okienka (1964)
- The First Day of Freedom (1964)
- Walkover (1965)
- Zamach stanu (1981)
