= Teresa Szmigielówna =

Polish actress

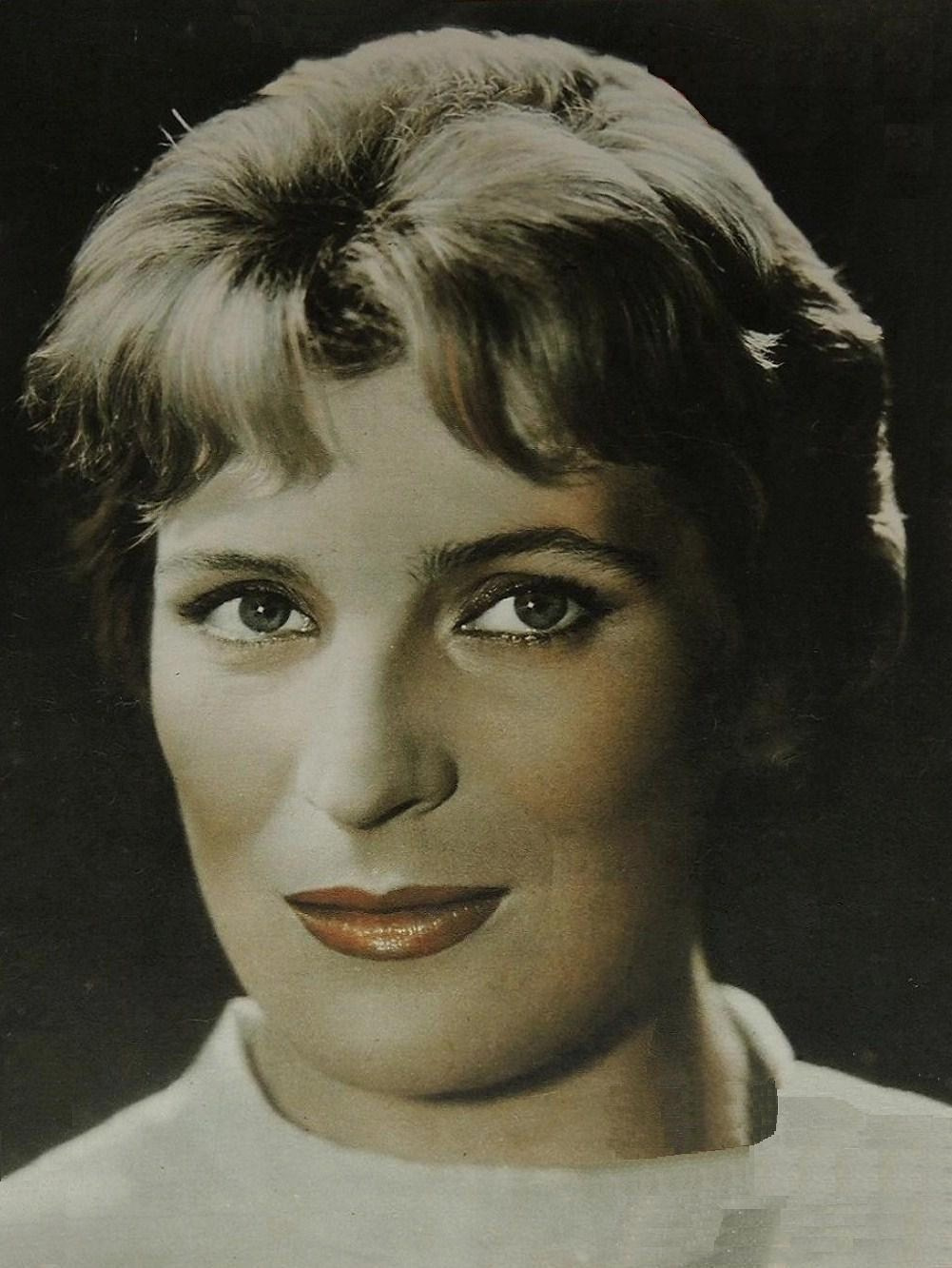
- Teresa Szmigielówna (1959)
- Born: 9 October 1929; Kobalówce, Tarnopol Voivodeship, Poland
- Died: 24 September 2013 (aged 83); Konstancin-Jeziorna, Poland
- Occupation: Actress
- Years active: 1951–2012

Teresa Szmigielówna (9 October 1929 – 24 September 2013) was a Polish actress. She appeared in more than sixty films from 1951 to 2012.

== Filmography ==
Year	Title	Role	Notes
1951	Warsaw Premiere		
1953	Three Stories	Nurse	(segment "Cement")
1954	Celuloza	Zocha	
1955	Kariera	Irena Hulewicz	
1956	Podhale w ogniu	Halszka Radocka	
1958	Noose	Kuba's old love	
1959	Night Train	Lawyer's Wife	
1959	Sygnaly	Malgorzata	
1960	Innocent Sorcerers	Nurse Teresa	
1961	Szczesciarz Antoni	Julia Grabczyk	
1961	Droga na zachód	Station Agent	
1963	Pamietnik pani Hanki	Halszka Kornilowska	
1965	Three Steps on Earth	Nurse	(segment "Godzina drogi")
1966	Jutro Meksyk	Wanda	
1966	Wieczór przedswiateczny	Technician in telephone-exchange	
1966	Pieklo i niebo	Ignacy's Girlfriend	Uncredited
1966	Barrier	Woman Crying in the Hospital	Uncredited
1966	Marysia i Napoleon	Guest at the ball	Uncredited
1968	Ostatni po Bogu	Hulewicz's wife	
1969	Molo	Marta	
1969	Zbrodniarz, który ukradl zbrodnie	Prosecutor	
1970	Prawdzie w oczy	Prokurator	
1972	Uciec jak najblizej	Saleswoman	
1976	Jaroslaw Dabrowski	Waleria Piotrowska	
1976	Krótkie zycie	Kruczkowska	
1976	Zagrozenie		
1977	Szarada	zona Piotra	
1978	Granica		
1978	Akwarele	Mother	
1979	Camera Buff		
1980	Zamach stanu	Aleksandra Pilsudska	
1980	Levins Mühle	Frau German	
1983	The Turning Point	Polnische Frau	
1983	On, ona, oni		
1984	Haracz szarego dnia	Zofia Karolak	
1984	Na strazy swej stac bede	Madejowa	
1985	Szkoda twoich lez	Helena	
1985	Kobieta w kapeluszu	Szyszkowska	
1989	Penelopy		
1989	Stan strachu		
1990	Korczak		
2001	Przedwiosnie	Aunt Aniela	
2003	The Foreigner	Old French Woman	
2003	Powiedz to, Gabi	Zofia	
2003	Warszawa	Neighbour	
2005	Rh+	Old woman	
2006	Who Never Lived	Guest	
2008	Before Twilight	Teresa	
2009	Miasto z morza		
2012	Mój rower	Jadwiga	
2012	Piata pora roku	Roman's Mother	(final film role)
