= Mieczysław Kalenik =

Polish actor (1933–2017)

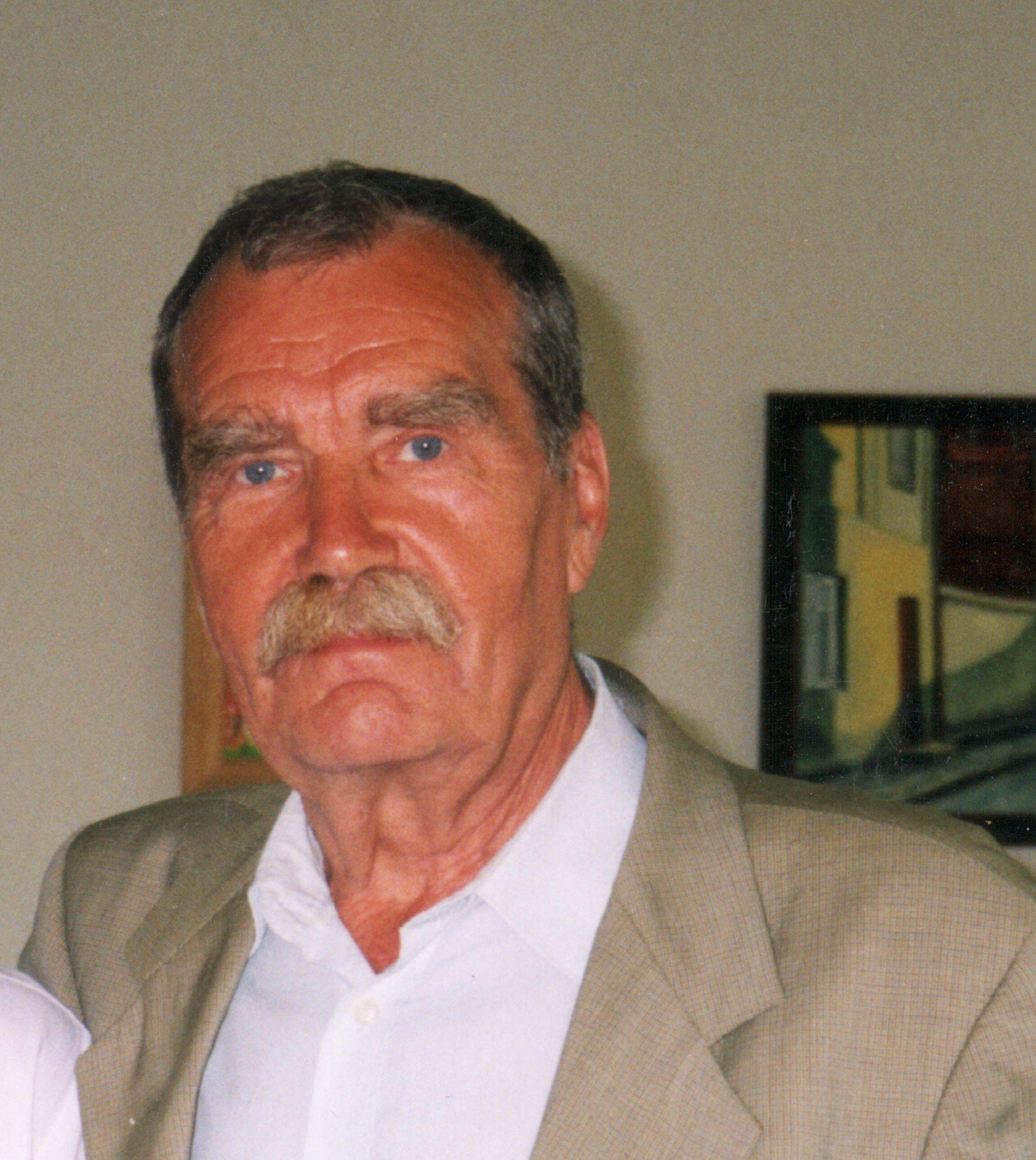
Mieczysław Kalenik

Mieczysław Kalenik (1 January 1933 – 16 June 2017) was a Polish actor.

== Selected filmography ==
- Knights of the Teutonic Order (1960)
- The First Day of Freedom (1964)
- Stawka większa niż życie (television; 1968)
- Tecumseh (1972)
- Czterdziestolatek (television; 1975)
- Kazimierz Wielki (1975)
- Jarosław Dąbrowski (1976)
- Pan Tadeusz (1999)
