= Maciej Maciejewski =

Polish actor

- Born: 1 October 1914; Augustów, Suwałki Governorate, Congress Poland, Russian Empire
- Died: 17 May 2018 (aged 103); Warsaw, Poland
- Occupation: Actor
- Years active: 1938–2008

Maciej Maciejewski (1 October 1914 – 17 May 2018) was a Polish screen and stage actor.

== Personal life ==
Maciej Maciejewski was born in Augustów. He made his debut in 1938 in Halka. He was employed at the Polish Theatre in Warsaw. Maciejewski turned 100 in October 2014. Maciejewski died in Warsaw in May 2018 at the age of 103.

== Filmography ==
- 1951: Youth of Chopin
- 1953: Żołnierz zwycięstwa
- 1954: Pod gwiazdą frygijską
- 1955: Podhale w ogniu
- 1957: Kanał
- 1957: The Real End of the Great War
- 1960: Rzeczywistość
- 1970: Epilog norymberski
- 1984: Polonia Restituta
- 1988: A Short Film About Killing
- 1998: Klan
- 2000: Egoiści
- 2002: Samo życie

=== Polish dubbing ===
- 1959: 12 Angry Men as Juror #6
- 1971: Elizabeth R as Gardiner
- 1986: Peter the Great as Patriarch Adrian of Moscow

== See also ==
- List of centenarians (actors, filmmakers and entertainers)
