= Tadeusz Gwiazdowski =

Polish actor (1918–1983)

- Born: 1 September 1918; Hamborn, Germany
- Died: 12 December 1983 (aged 65); Gdynia, Poland
- Occupation: Actor
- Years active: 1956–1981

Tadeusz Gwiazdowski (1 September 1918 – 12 December 1983) was a Polish actor. He appeared in more than 30 films and television shows between 1957 and 1981.

== Filmography ==
Year	Title	Role	Notes
1956	Nikodem Dyzma	Gabrys	
1957	Kanał	Sgt. 'Kula'	
1957	Trzy kobiety		
1957	Skarb kapitana Martensa	Antoni	
1957	Kapelusz pana Anatola	Militiaman Migdal	
1958	Noose	Supt. Zenek	
1958	Wolne miasto	German Seaman	
1959	Night Train	Train Controller	
1959	The Eagle	Boatswain Bryt	
1963	Ostatni kurs	Kazik Górski	
1964	Zona dla Australijczyka	Red Bus Driver	
1964	Wilczy bilet	Zakrzewski	
1964	Echo		
1965	Banda	majster w Stoczni Gdanskiej	
1966	Jutro Meksyk	Chairman	
1968	Ostatni po Bogu	Officer at the New Year's Ball	
1969	Skok	Teresa's Father	
1970	Prom	bosman na holowniku 'Bosman	
1972	Seksolatki	mezczyzna w mieszkaniu znajomego Danki	
1973	Z tamtej strony teczy		
1974	Drzwi w murze	Porcelain Dog Seller	
1976	Kazimierz Wielki		
1980	Wizja lokalna 1901		
1980	Levins Mühle	Pfarrer	
1981	Man of Iron	Shipyard Worker	
