= Teresa Iżewska =

Polish actress (1933–1982)

- Born: 8 April 1933; Warsaw, Poland
- Died: 26 August 1982 (aged 49); Gdańsk, Poland
- Burial place: Łostowic Cemetery, Gdańsk, Poland
- Occupation: Actress
- Years active: 1957–1982

Teresa Iżewska (8 April 1933 – 26 August 1982) was a Polish actress. She appeared in ten films between 1957 and 1982.

She was buried at the Łostowicki cemetery in Gdańsk.

== Selected filmography ==
- Kanał (1957)
- Rancho Texas (1959)
- Baza ludzi umarlych (1959) - Translated: "Depot of the Dead" - Written by: Marek Hłasko
- Nafta (1961)
- Spotkanie w "Bajce" (1962)
- Mansarda (1963)
- Kryptonim Nektar (1963)
- Rozwodów nie bedzie (1964)
- Podróz za jeden usmiech (TV Mini Series) (1972)
- Odwet (1983)
