= Jadwiga Chojnacka =

Polish actress (1900–1992)

- Born: 11 October 1900; Warsaw, Congress Poland
- Died: 23 December 1992 (aged 92); Warsaw, Poland
- Occupation: Actress
- Years active: 1948-1989

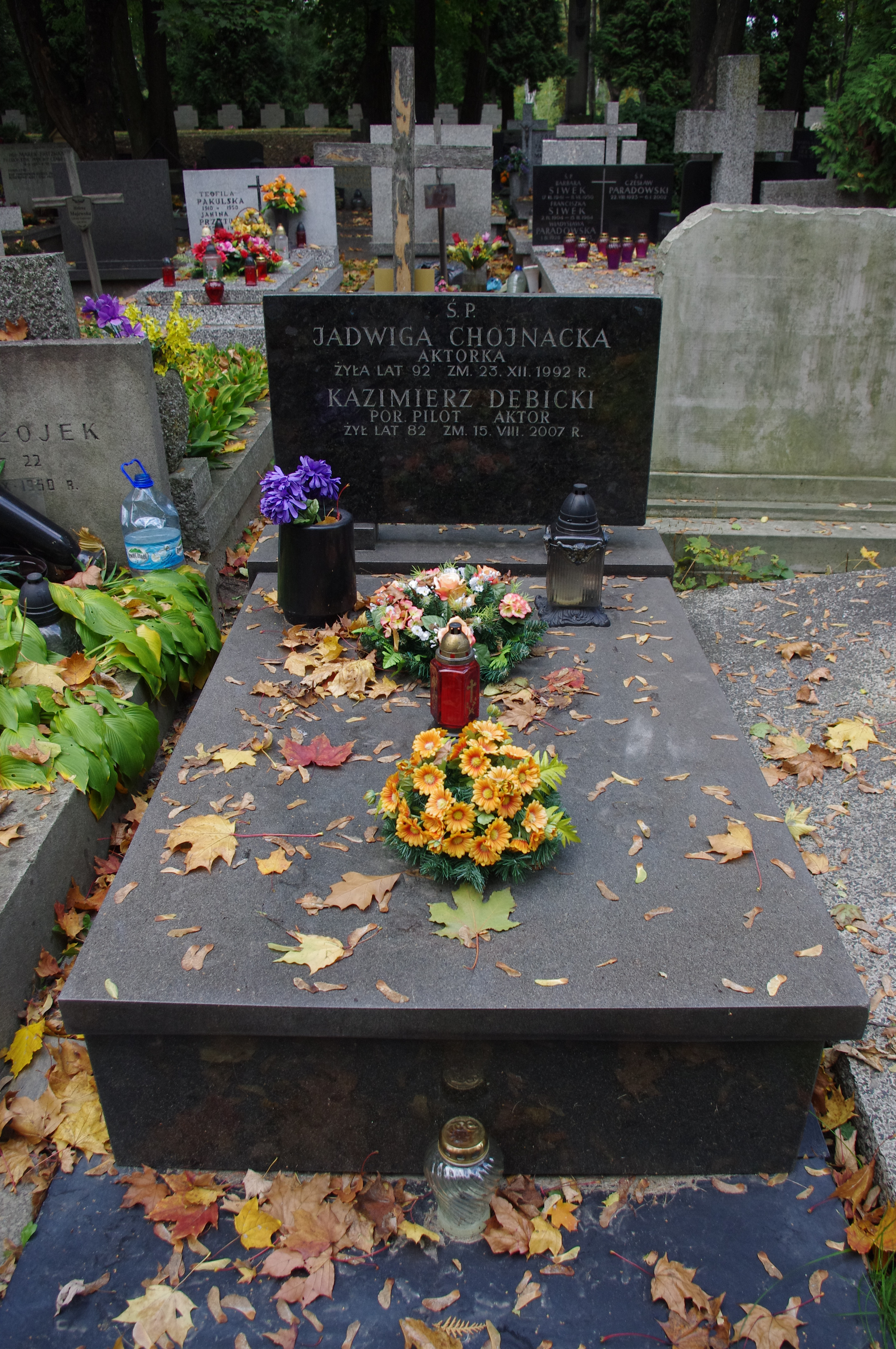
Grave of Kazimierz Dębicki and Jadwiga Chojnacka at the Powązki Military Cemetery in Warsaw

Jadwiga Chojnacka (11 October 1900 – 23 December 1992) was a Polish film actress. She appeared in more than 30 films between 1948 and 1989.

== Selected filmography ==
- Five Boys from Barska Street (1954)
- Tonight a City Will Die (1961)
- Panienka z okienka (1964)
- Copernicus (1973)
- The Story of Sin (1975)
