= Tadeusz Wieżan =

Cinematographer, screenwriter and playwright (1929–1982)

- Born: 1 September 1929; Vilnius
- Died: 29 November 1982 (aged 53); Warsaw
- Occupations: Cinematographer, screenwriter, playwright

Tadeusz Wieżan (1 September 1929 – 29 November 1982) was a cinematographer, screenwriter and playwright.

== Biography ==
In 1954 he graduated in cinematography from the Łódź Film School. He was teacher and vice-dean of the Faculty of Cinematography of the Łódź Film School.

== Filmography ==
As cinematographer

- Miasteczko (1958)
- Lunatycy (1959)
- Rzeczywistość (1960)
- Decyzja (1960)
- Kryptonim Nektar (1963)
- Mam tu swój dom (1963)
- The First Day of Freedom (1964)
- Śmierć w środkowym pokoju (1965; short film)
- Głos ma prokurator (1965)
- Cała naprzód (1966)
- Ja gorę! (1967; short film)
- Ślepy tor (1967)
- Poradnik matrymonialny (1967)
- Szach i mat! (1967; short film)
- Człowiek z M-3 (1968)
- Zaliczenie (1968; short film)
- Rzeczpospolita babska (1969)
- Szkice warszawskie (1969)
- Kolumbowie (1970; TV series)
- Doktor Ewa (1970; TV series)
- Kocie ślady (1971; TV film)
- Hubal (1973)
- Ile jest życia (1974; TV series)
- Na tropach Bartka (1982)

As screenwriter

- Brylanty pani Zuzy (1971)
- Ballada o ścinaniu drzewa (1972)

Source.

== Plays ==
- Och, jaki piękny świat
- Zakręt
- Nasze kawalerskie
- Jak nie ja, to kto?
- Prezes
- Simanioki

Source.

== Accolades ==
- Minister of National Defence Award for Kolumbowie (1970)
