= Kolumbowie (TV series) =

- Written by: Roman Bratny
- Directed by: Janusz Morgenstern
- Starring: Jan Englert; Władysław Kowalski; Jerzy Matałowski
- Composer: Jerzy Matuszkiewicz

Production
- Cinematography: Tadeusz Wieżan
- Editors: Krystyna Rutkowska, Elżbieta Kurkowska

Kolumbowie is a 1970 mini-series directed by Janusz Morgenstern, written by Roman Bratny, based on Bratny's novel Kolumbowie. Rocznik 20.

== Production ==
The series was shot in Warsaw and Gdańsk.

== Cast ==
Source.

- Jan Englert as Zygmunt
- Władysław Kowalski as Jerzy
- Jerzy Matałowski as Stanisław Skiernik "Kolumb"
- Krzysztof Machowski as „Czarny Olo”
- Marek Perepeczko as „Malutki”
- Karol Strasburger as „Siwy”
- Jerzy Trela as lieutenant Jerzy Jagiełło „Florian” and his brother Władysław (two roles)
- Alicja Jachiewicz as „Niteczka”
- Bożena Kowalczyk as Baśka
- Halina Golanko as „Ałła”

== List of episodes ==
Source.

1. Śmierć po raz pierwszy
2. Żegnaj Baśka
3. A jeśli będzie wiosna
4. Oto dziś
5. Śmierć po raz drugi
