= Stanisław Niwiński =

Polish actor

- Born: 8 May 1932; Warsaw, Poland
- Died: 4 May 2002 (aged 69); Warsaw, Poland
- Occupation: Actor
- Years active: 1961–1992

Stanisław Niwiński (8 May 1932 – 4 May 2002) was a Polish actor. He appeared in more than 45 films and television shows between 1961 and 1992.

== Selected filmography ==
- Spotkanie w "Bajce" (1962)
- Black Wings (1963)
- Katastrofa (1965)
- Hubal (1973)
