= Jerzy Matałowski =

Polish actor

- Born: Jerzy Matałowski; 1 February 1948; Straubing, Germany
- Died: 1 December 2013 (aged 65); Warsaw, Poland
- Occupation: Actor
- Years active: 1969–2013
- Spouse: Dorota

Jerzy Matałowski (1 February 1948 – 1 December 2013) was a Polish film, stage and television actor.

Born in Straubing, Germany, Matałowski graduated from the National Film School in Łódź, Poland in 1970. He was most noted for his role in the television series Czarne chmury, which was first broadcast in 1973.

Jerzy Matałowski died on 1 December 2013, aged 65, in Warsaw.

== Filmography ==
- Kolumbowie (TV series; 1970)
