= Noose (1958 film) =

Noose (Pętla)
- Directed by: Wojciech Jerzy Has
- Screenplay by: Marek Hłasko, Wojciech Jerzy Has
- Based on: Pętla by Marek Hłasko
- Starring: Gustaw Holoubek; Aleksandra Śląska; Teresa Szmigielówna; Tadeusz Fijewski; Stanisław Milski
- Cinematography: Mieczyslaw Jahoda
- Edited by: Zofia Dwornik
- Music by: Tadeusz Baird
- Production company: Studio Filmowe Iluzjon
- Release date: 20 January 1958
- Running time: 96 minutes
- Country: Poland
- Language: Polish

Noose (Polish: Pętla) is a Polish film released in 1958, directed by Wojciech Jerzy Has, and starring Gustaw Holoubek. The film is an adaptation of a short story by Marek Hłasko, and follows a day in the life of an alcoholic.

== Plot ==
Kuba Kowalski (Gustaw Holoubek) is an alcoholic who spends most of his day in his room with a bottle of vodka for company and a noose dangling from the ceiling. His ruminations are periodically interrupted by his girlfriend Krystyna (Aleksandra Slaska) banging on the door.

== Cast ==
- Gustaw Holoubek as Kuba Kowalski
- Aleksandra Śląska as Krystyna
- Teresa Szmigielówna as Kuba's old love
- Tadeusz Fijewski as Władek
- Stanisław Milski as Rybicki
- Władysław Dewoyno as Electrician Władek
- Tadeusz Gwiazdowski as Supt. Zenek
- Juliusz Grabowski as Waiter
- Marian Jastrzębski as Tailor
- Emil Karewicz as Waiter Gienek
- Roman Kłosowski as Electrician Janek
- Ignacy Machowski as Sergeant
- Helena Makowska-Fijewska as Barmaid
- Igor Przegrodzki as Kuba's friend
- Zygmunt Zintel as Harmonist Poldei

== Release ==
Released on 20 January 1958, the film is Has's debut feature film and regarded as one of the most interesting film adaptations of Marek Hłasko's work and actor Gustaw Holoubek's first great work. The film's cynical vision ensured that communist authorities in Poland did not give it permission to be shown abroad.

== See also ==
- Cinema of Poland
- List of Polish language films
