= Michał Jagiełło (writer) =

Writer and politician (1941–2016)

- Born: 23 August 1941; Janikowice
- Died: 1 February 2016 (aged 74); Zakopane
- Occupation: Writer

Michał Jagiełło (23 August 1941 – 1 February 2016) was a writer, poet, screenwriter, mountaineer and politician.

== Biography ==
He was the son of Piotr Jagiełło and Marianna née Janus, farmers. In 1964 he graduated in Polish studies from the Jagiellonian University. From 1964 to 1974, he lived in Zakopane, where he served as the head of the Tatra Volunteer Search and Rescue (GOPR) group from 1972 to 1974. In 1975, he moved to Warsaw. From 1966 to 1981 he was a member of the Polish United Workers' Party. From December 1980, he was deputy head of the Culture Department of the Polish United Workers' Party Central Committee. Following the declaration of martial law, he resigned from the party. In 1989, he was appointed undersecretary of state at the ministry of culture in the cabinet of Tadeusz Mazowiecki. He held this post in successive governments until 1997. He was director of the National Library from 1998 to 2007. His remainings were buried at the New Cemetery in Zakopane.

== Books ==
=== Short stories ===
- Obsesja. Wydawnictwo Literackie. 1978.
- Świetlista obręcz. Czytelnik. 1979.
- Trójkątna turnia. Iskry. 1996.
- Za granią grań. Iskry. 1998.

=== Novels ===
- Hotel klasy Lux. Czytelnik. 1978.
- Bez oddechu. Czytelnik. 1981.
- Studnia. Czytelnik. 1985.

=== Poetry ===
- Goryczka, słodyczka, czas opowieści, wiersze. Wydawnictwo Adam Marszałek. 2007.
- Sosna i pies. Poemat z zagrody. Iskry. 2008.
- Ciało i pamięć. Wiersze. Iskry. 2010.

== Filmography (as screenwriter) ==
- 1979: Hotel klasy lux

== Accolades ==
- Gold Cross of Merit (1980)
- Officer's Cross of the Order of the Lithuanian Grand Duke Gediminas (1997)
- Officer's Cross of the Order of Polonia Restituta (1998)
- Commander's Cross of the Order of Polonia Restituta (2009)
- Gold Gloria Artis Medal for Merit to Culture

== Bibliography ==
- Kto jest kim w polityce polskiej. Warszawa: Polska Agencja Informacyjna. 1993. p. 110. ISBN 83-223-2645-9.
