= Bolesław Śmiały (film) =

1971 Polish film

- Directed by: Witold Lesiewicz
- Starring: Ignacy Gogolewski
- Music by: Wojciech Kilar
- Release date: 1971
- Country: Poland
- Language: Polish

Bolesław Śmiały is a Polish historical film about Bolesław II the Generous. It was released in 1971.

== Cast ==
- Ignacy Gogolewski − as Bolesław II Śmiały
- Jerzy Kaliszewski − as Stanisław ze Szczepanowa
- Aleksandra Śląska
- Maria Ciesielska
- Zdzisław Mrożewski
- Kazimierz Opaliński
- Michał Pawlicki
- Kazimierz Meres
- Mieczysław Voit
- Piotr Fronczewski
- Jerzy Zelnik
- Krzysztof Machowski
- Andrzej Zaorski
- Maciej Englert
- Mieczysław Stoor
- Alicja Raciszówna
- Jerzy Goliński
- Czesław Lasota
- Henryk Bąk
- Halina Gryglaszewska
- Tadeusz Schmidt
- Maciej Góraj
