= Wilcza Street, Warsaw =

Street in Warsaw

Coordinates: 52°13′29″N 21°00′54″E

Wilcza Street
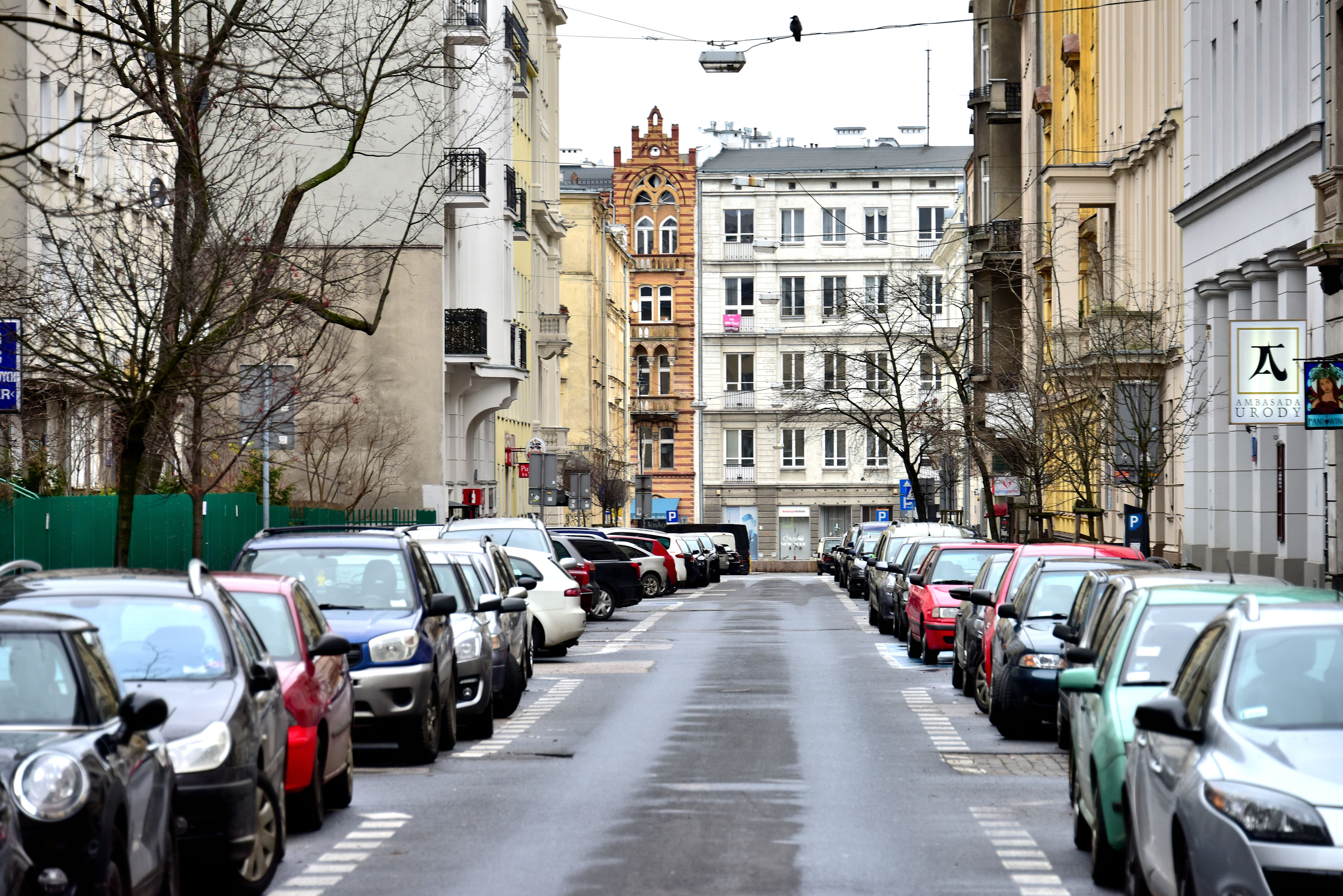
- Wilcza with its historical tenements on both sides
- Interactive map of Wilcza Street
- Length: 1,200 m (3,900 ft)
- Location: South Downtown, Warsaw
- East end: Ujazdów Ave.
- Major junctions: Mokotowska St. Krucza St. Marszałkowska St. Poznańska St. Emilii Plater St.
- West end: Koszykowa St.

Wilcza (lit. Wolf Street) is a street in Warsaw's city centre. It links Koszykowa Street in the south-eastern part of the borough with the Three Crosses Square at the Royal Route. Initially, at least since 14th century, the street was just a road running along by the fields belonging to the vogts of old Warsaw, much to the south of the city's limits.

As the family of Wilk (Polish word for wolf) dominated the office of the city's vogt throughout the 15th century, the road started to be referred to by their name, initially in the form of Wilcze or Na Wilczem (Wilks' or At the Wilks, respectively). With time the real etymology became obscure and the name started to be associated with the literal meaning of the surname rather than the surname itself. In 1770 the name was officially approved by the Naming Commission.

== History ==
The old rural road ran through the land of the Warsaw village heads (wójtowie), who in the 15th century were the Wilk family. Therefore, the land was called Wilcza (meaning “of the Wilks”) or Na Wilczem. The street’s name, given in 1770, comes directly from the name of that property. Another old name for this street was Kałęczyńska.

Around 1765, the owner of these lands, Grand Crown Marshal Franciszek Bieliński, divided up (parcelated) the Wilcza estate and laid out a street through its center.

After 1860, the street became lined with houses and tenement buildings, and in 1881 it was extended to Wielka Street (now Poznańska Street), and later to Koszykowa Street.

The street’s buildings were damaged during the Siege of Warsaw in September 1939.

Wilcza Street is one of the few streets in downtown Warsaw that has preserved pre-war buildings along long stretches on both sides.

== Buildings ==
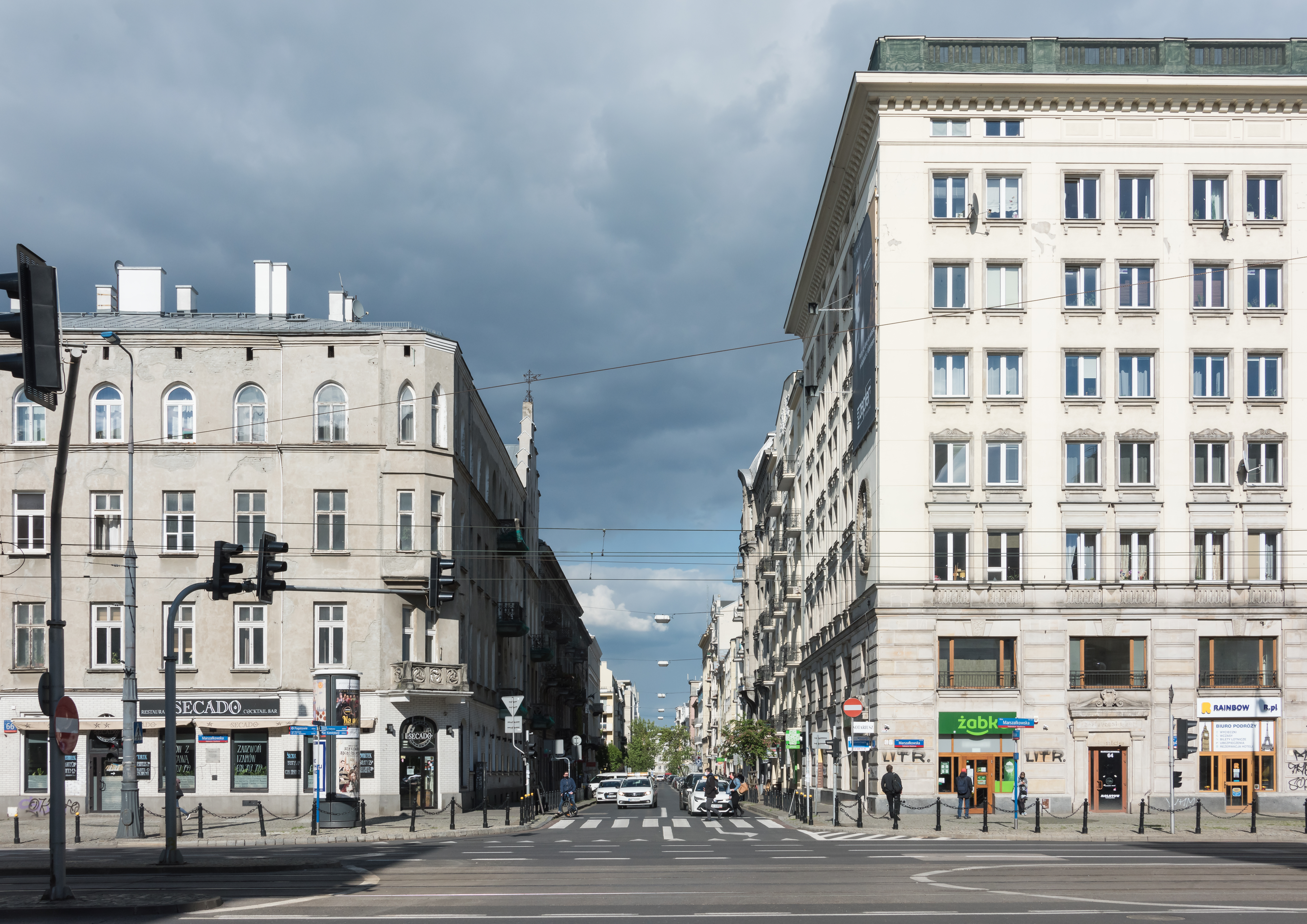
Wilcza Street at Marszałkowska Street in Warsaw

9A Wilcza Street is on the register of monuments in Poland. The building was constructed between 1923 and 1925 to a design by Gustaw Trzciński who was one of the early instigators of reinforced concrete construction in Poland.

- 7 Wilcza Street – Roman Catholic Chapel of Our Lady of Perpetual Help
- 21 Wilcza Street – Warsaw-Śródmieście Police Station
- 30 Wilcza Street – Syrena Squat
- 31 Wilcza Street – Polish Catholic Church Center named after Bishop Francis Hodur
- 31 Wilcza Street – Polish Catholic Chapel of Divine Mercy
- 46 Wilcza Street – Office of the Ombudsman for Small and Medium-Sized Entrepreneurs
- 53 Wilcza Street – Primary School No. 1 named after Gustaw Morcinek
- 64 Wilcza Street – Museum and Institute of Zoology of the Polish Academy of Sciences
- 71 Wilcza Street – Horowitz Tenement House
- 73 Wilcza Street – Nobu Hotel Warsaw

== In fiction ==
In Andrzej Wajda's 1956 film, Kanał, members of the Home Army seek an exit from the sewers to Wilcza Street.
