= Mieczysław Stoor =

Polish actor

- Born: 5 September 1929; Bojanowo, Poland
- Died: 5 October 1973 (aged 44); Krasnik Lubelski, Poland
- Occupation: Actor
- Years active: 1954–1973

Mieczysław Stoor (5 September 1929 – 5 October 1973) was a Polish film actor. He appeared in 37 films between 1954 and 1973.

== Selected filmography ==
- Boleslaw Smialy (1972)
- Landscape After the Battle (1970)
- Jak rozpętałem drugą wojnę światową (1970)
- The First Day of Freedom (1964)
- Five Boys from Barska Street (1954)
