= Bohdan Wróblewski =

Polish graphic designer (1931–2017)

Bohdan Wróblewski (born 8 June 1931 – 31 May 2017) was a Polish graphic designer. In 1957, he graduated from the Academy of Fine Arts in Warsaw where he studied under the great Polish illustrator Jan Marcin Szancer. He deals with functional graphics. He is the author of countless illustrations, which tell the story of the development of technology, especially that of military and civil aviation, automobiles and railways. He draws with extraordinary precision, only by hand, with the use of gouache and ink. He has created numerous illustrations for books for children and adolescents, as well as graphics in lexicons, encyclopediae and guides. He has published a few richly illustrated original albums, e.g. "Jaki znak twój? – orzeł biały" ("What's your emblem? – Eagle in white" - a reference to a patriotic rhyme for children) about the iconography related to the Polish emblem and the history of Polish military. He has cooperated with the editors of popular Polish satirical, specialist and children's

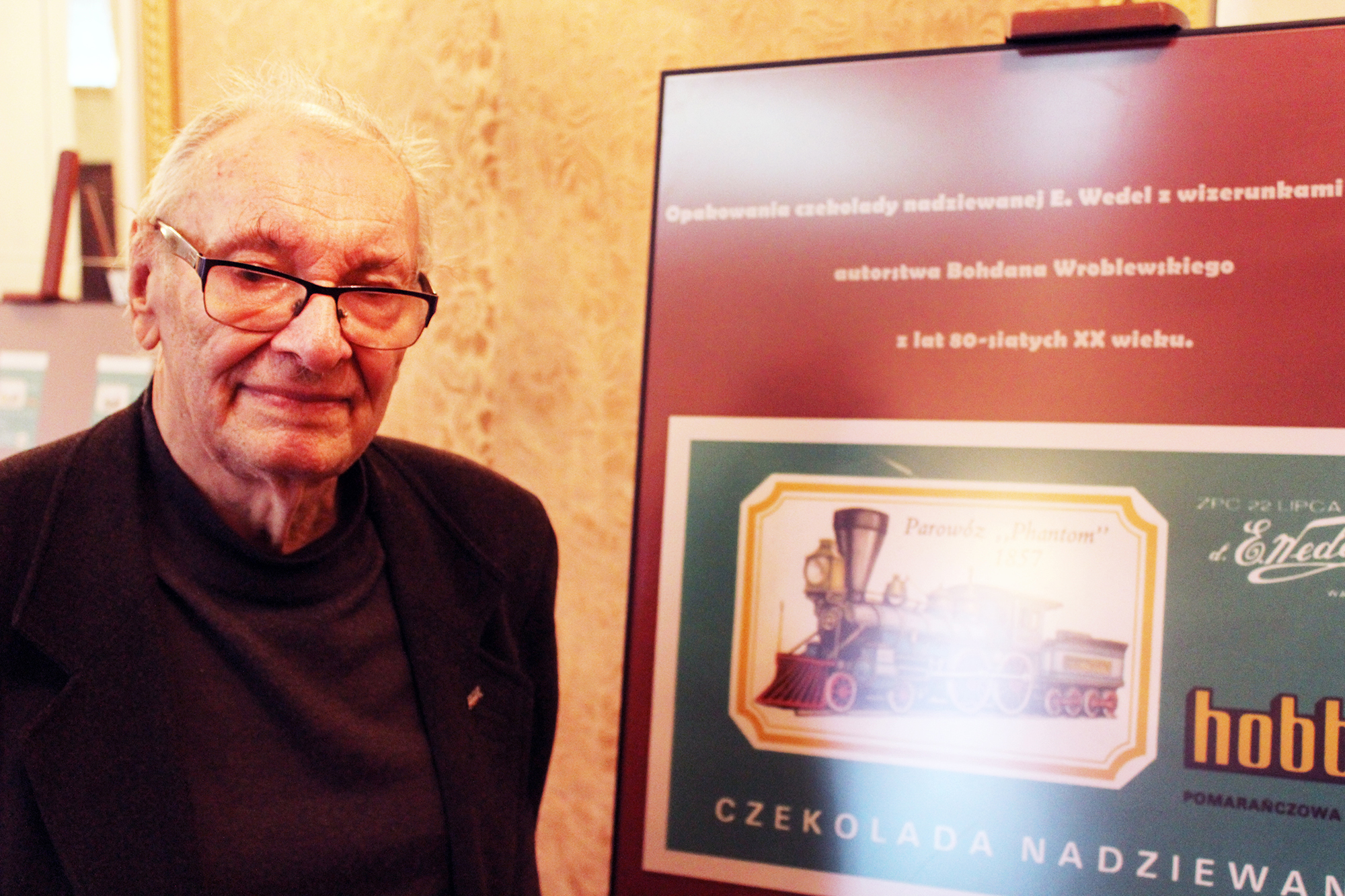
Bohdan Wróblewski

periodicals. He is the forefather of Polish photography and advertising graphics. He designed and directed advertisement footage in the 70s and 80s for advertising campaigns of brands such as LOT Polish Airlines or Polski Fiat outside of Poland. He is the author of the cult package design of E. Wedel's Confectionery Plant chocolate and a few series of stamps for Poczta Polska (Polish Post). He is also the forerunner of Polish paper toys. In private, he is known as a peerless storyteller. In 2002, Bohdan Wróblewski was awarded the Silver Cross of Merit, a Polish award given in recognition of services done to the state.

== Selected publications ==
- Smoki: 5 modeli papierowych Bohdana Wróblewskiego. [tekst: Przemysław J. Olszewski, Wydawnictwo Znakomite, 2015, ISBN 9788394260033] (in Polish)
- Praga gada: o pokoju. [red. albumu Przemysław J. Olszewski, Wydawnictwo Fundacji Animacja, 2014, ISBN 9788364293016] (in Polish)
- Od A do Z. [tekst: Janusz Minkiewicz. Wydawnictwo Dwie Siostry, 2009. ISBN 9788360850961] (in Polish)
- Jaki znak twój? - orzeł biały . [tekst i il.: Bohdan Wróblewski, ZP Grupa, 2007, ISBN 9788392660644] (in Polish)
- Air force uniforms : Canada, United States of America. [text by: Andrzej Gałązka, il. Piotr Głowacki - emblems and badges, Bohdan Wróblewski - uniforms, Bellona, 1996, ISBN 8311084289]
- Wolny mustang [tekst: Ernest Thompsohn Seton, przekł. z ang. Jan Sokolicz-Wroczyński, Egross, 1992, PB 1992/6765] (Polish translation of English original)
- Okulary. [tekst: Julian Tuwim, Nasza Księgarnia, 1979, ISBN 8310077289] (in Polish)
- O piracie Rum-Barbari i o czymś jeszcze. [tekst: Adam Bahdaj, Biuro Wydawnicze "Ruch", 1971, PB 1971/4041] (in Polish)
- Mój czerwony latawiec [tekst: Alois Mikulka; z czes. przeł. Hanna Kostyrko, Nasza Księgarnia, 1966, PB 1966/7814] (in Polish)
- Tadek Niejadek [tekst: Wanda Chotomska, Biuro Wydawnicze "Ruch", 1960, PB 1960/1491] (in Polish).
