= Zofia Wilczyńska =

Polish politician (1942–2024)

Member of the Sejm
- In office 14 October 1993 – 18 October 2005
- In office 4 July 1989 – 25 October 1991

Personal details
- Born: 24 May 1942 German-occupied Ukraine
- Died: 15 June 2024 (aged 82)
- Party: PZPR; SLD
- Education: Pomeranian University in Słupsk
- Occupation: Schoolteacher

Zofia Wilczyńska (24 May 1942 – 15 June 2024) was a Polish politician. A member of the Polish United Workers' Party and the Democratic Left Alliance, she served in the Sejm from 1989 to 1991 and again from 1993 to 2005.

Wilczyńska died on 15 June 2024, at the age of 82.
