= Spotkanie w "Bajce" =

- Directed by: Jan Rybkowski
- Written by: Jan Rybkowski; Michael Tonecki
- Produced by: Film Polski
- Starring: Aleksandra Śląska; Gustaw Holoubek; Andrzej Łapicki
- Cinematography: Mieczyslaw Jahoda
- Music by: Wojciech Kilar
- Release date: 19 December 1962
- Running time: 72 minutes
- Country: Poland
- Language: Polish

Spotkanie w "Bajce" (Café From The Past) is a 1962 Polish psychological drama film directed by Jan Rybkowski. Also known as Meeting in the Fable, it was produced by Film Polski, and starred Aleksandra Śląska, Gustaw Holoubek, Andrzej Łapicki and Teresa Izewska. The writers Jan Rybkowski and Michal Tonecki developed it from a story Tonecki had originally written as a radio play.

Set in post-war Poland, the story is a marital triangle involving Victor a famous pianist, Teresa, and her husband Doctor Paul from whom she is separated. The three meet after fifteen years in a café called Fable (Bajce). The film was entered in the 3rd International Film Festival of India held in Delhi, India, from January 8–21, 1965.

== Cast ==
- Aleksandra Śląska as Teresa
- Gustaw Holoubek as Paul
- Andrzej Łapicki as Victor
- Teresa Iżewska as Eve
- Maria Wachowiak - waitress
- Mieczyslaw Pawlikowski - President of MRN
- Mieczyslaw Fogiel - MRN employee
- Beata Barszczewska as Christie, daughter Teresa
- Magdalena Zawadzka - the daughter of the President of the MRN
- Stanisław Niwiński - truck driver
