= The First Day of Freedom =

1964 Polish film

- Directed by: Aleksander Ford
- Written by: Bohdan Czeszko; Leon Kruczkowski
- Starring: Tadeusz Łomnicki
- Cinematography: Tadeusz Wieżan
- Edited by: Miroslawa Garlicka
- Release date: 21 December 1964
- Running time: 89 minutes
- Country: Poland
- Language: Polish

The First Day of Freedom (Polish: Pierwszy dzień wolności - Italian: Il Tramonto degli Eroi) is a 1964 Polish drama film directed by Aleksander Ford. It was entered into the 1965 Cannes Film Festival.

== Cast ==
- Tadeusz Łomnicki - Lt. Jan
- Beata Tyszkiewicz - Inga Rhode
- Tadeusz Fijewski - Dr. Rhode
- Ryszard Barycz - Michal
- Krzysztof Chamiec - Hieronym
- Roman Kłosowski - Karol
- Mieczysław Stoor - Pawel
- Elżbieta Czyżewska - Luzzi Rhode
- Aldona Jaworska
- Mieczysław Kalenik - Otto
- Zdzislaw Lesniak - The Oddball
- Mieczyslaw Milecki
- Kazimierz Rudzki
- Vsevolod Sanayev - (as Wsewolod Sanejew)
- Mikhail Pugovkin
