= Przeor Kordecki – obrońca Częstochowy =

1934 Polish film

Przeor Kordecki – obrońca Częstochowy is a Polish historical film. It was released in 1934.
