= Ignacy Gogolewski =

Polish actor (1931–2022)

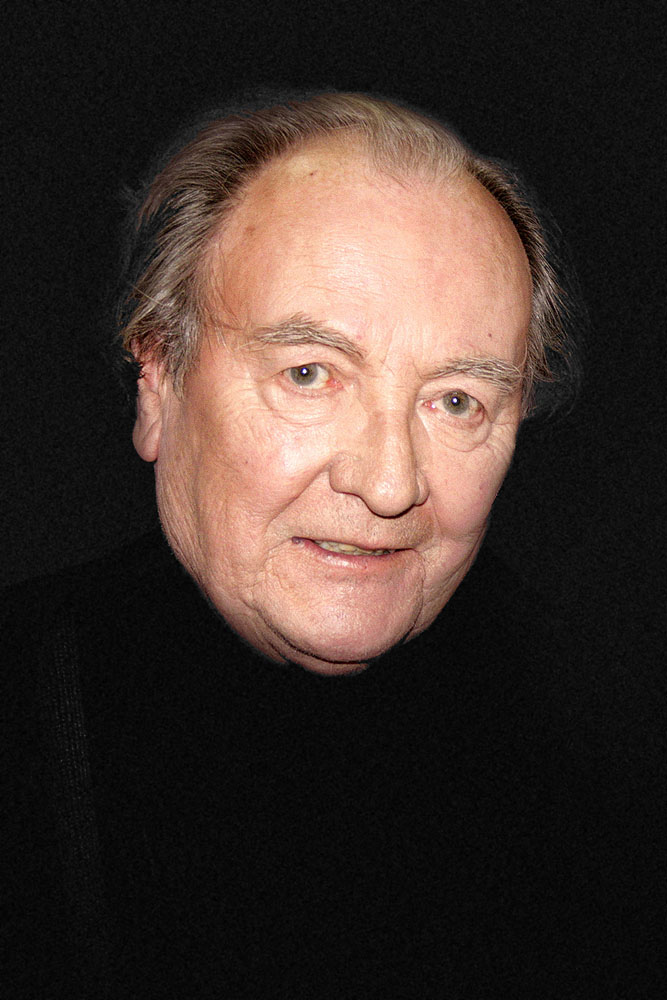
- Gogolewski in 2010
- Born: 17 June 1931; Ciechanów, Warsaw Voivodeship, Poland
- Died: 15 May 2022 (aged 90)
- Occupation: Actor
- Years active: 1953–2022
- Spouse: Katarzyna Łaniewska (m. 1954; div. 1964)

Ignacy Gogolewski (17 June 1931 – 15 May 2022) was a Polish film actor. He appeared in more than 30 films.

== Filmography ==
- Three Stories (1953)
- Zaczarowany rower (1955)
- Tonight a City Will Die (1961)
- The Codes (1966)
- Stawka większa niż życie (1967)
- Boleslaw Smialy (1972)
- Zamach stanu (1980)

== Death ==
Gogolewski died on 15 May 2022 at the age of 90.
