= Marian Rułka =

Polish theatre and film actor

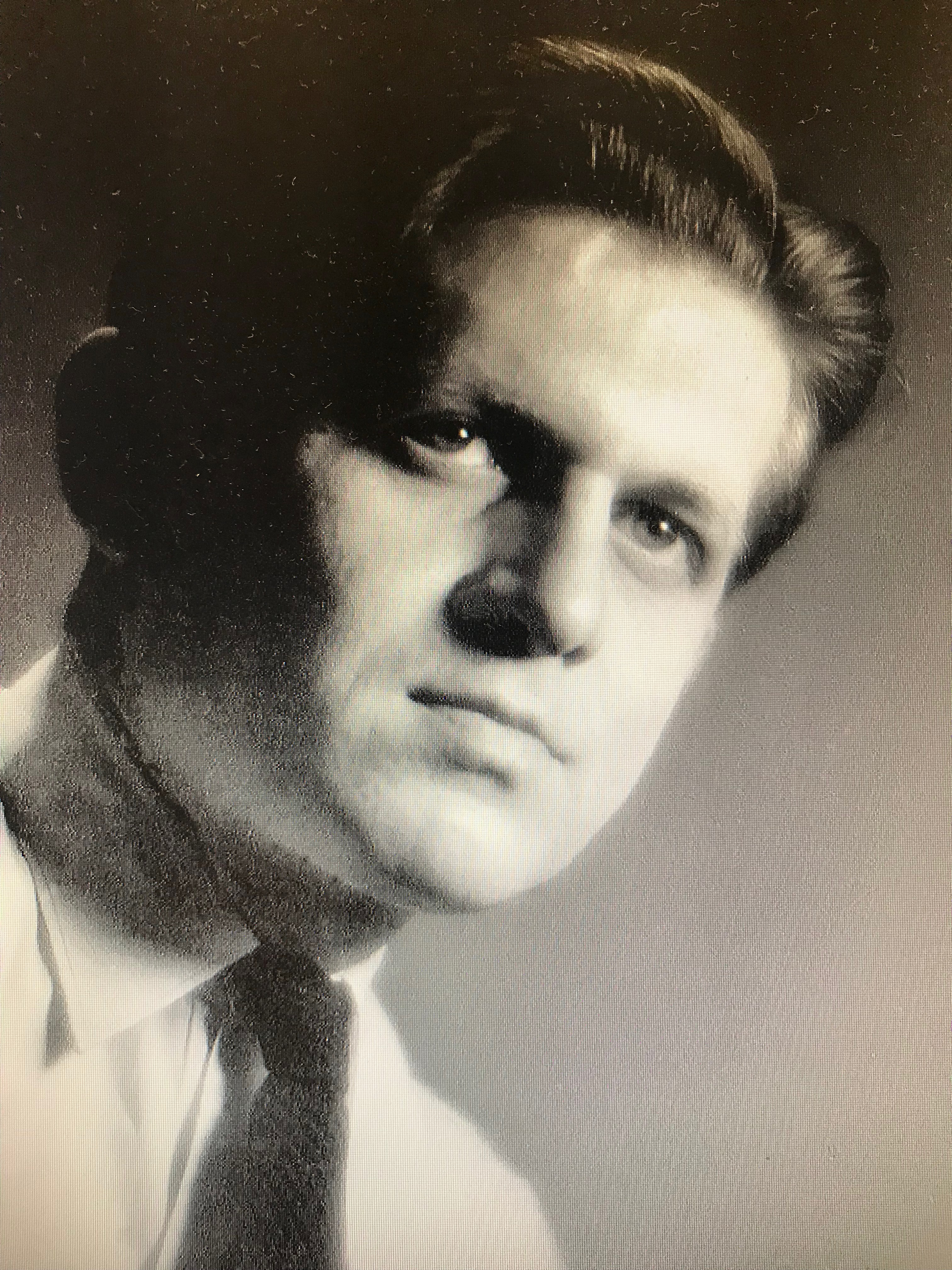
Marian Rułka

Marian Rułka (22 July 1929, Lublin – 13 November 1983, Warsaw) was a Polish theatre and film actor. In 1952 he graduated from The Aleksander Zelwerowicz National Academy of Dramatic Art in Warsaw. He has worked in the Ateneum Theatre, the Juliusz Osterwa Theatre in Lublin, the Wola Theatre in Warsaw, and National Theatre in Warsaw.
