= Janusz Paluszkiewicz =

Polish actor

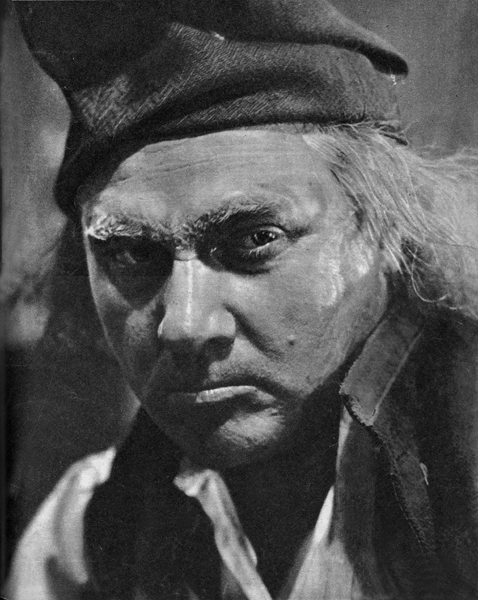
- in Friedrich Wolf's play "Beaumarchais" 1950
- Born: 20 March 1912; Łódź, Russian Empire (now Łódź, Poland)
- Died: 19 February 1990 (aged 77); Glowno, Poland
- Occupation: Actor
- Years active: 1952–1988

Janusz Paluszkiewicz (20 March 1912 – 19 February 1990) was a Polish actor. He appeared in more than 50 films and television shows between 1952 and 1988.

== Filmography ==
Year	Title	Role	Notes
1952	Gromada	Comrade Krychal	
1955	A Generation	Sekula	
1957	Man on the Tracks	Krokus	
1957	Pozegnanie z diablem	Guide	
1959	Café pod Minoga	German soldier	
1960	Tysiac talarów	Bombasinski	
1960	Knights of the Teutonic Order	Royal Marshal	
1961	Ostroznie, Yeti!	Receptionist in the Prison	
1961	Husband of His Wife	Porter	Uncredited
1961	Rzeczywistosc	Communist Gawalek	
1961	Swiadectwo urodzenia		(segment "Kropla krwi")
1962	Rodzina Milcarków		
1964	Nieznany		
1964	Przerwany lot		
1966	Miejsce dla jednego	Cyprian	Uncredited
1966	Pieklo i niebo	Forester	
1967	Westerplatte	Sgt. Leonard Piotrowski	
1969	Samotnosc we dwoje	Forester Józef	
1970	Szkice warszawskie	Stankiewicz	
1974	Drzwi w murze		
1975	Awans	Blazej Zakala	
1975	Nights and Days	Banasiak	
1975	Opadly liscie z drzew	Piorun	
1976	Partita na instrument drewniany	Sawmill Owner Laciak	
1976	Motylem jestem, czyli romans czterdziestolatka	Workman	Uncredited
1977	Gdzie woda czysta i trawa zielona		
1978	Wszyscy i nikt	Priest	
1979	Bilet powrotny	Gosc na weselu	
1980	Gwiazdy poranne	Janek's Father	
1980	Zielone lata		
1982	Rys	Sacristan Józef	
1983	Punkty za pochodzenie	Wladek's Uncle	
1983	Pastorale heroica	Karas	
1983	Pensja pani Latter	Mielnicki	
1984	Dom swietego Kazimierza	Colonel Gradowski	
1986	W cieniu nienawisci	Priest	
1986	Zielone kasztany	Grandfather Stanislaw	
1987	Aniol w szafie	Józef, Maniek's Father	
