= Knights of the Teutonic Order (film) =

1960 Polish film

- Theatrical release poster by Polish artist Roman Cieślewicz
- Directed by: Aleksander Ford
- Screenplay by: Aleksander Ford; Jerzy Stefan Stawiński
- Based on: The Knights of the Cross by Henryk Sienkiewicz
- Produced by: Zygmunt Król
- Starring: Grażyna Staniszewska; Urszula Modrzyńska; Mieczysław Kalenik; Aleksander Fogiel
- Cinematography: Mieczysław Jahoda
- Edited by: Mirosława Garlicka, Alina Faflik
- Music by: Kazimierz Serocki
- Production company: Zespół Filmowy
- Release date: 15 July 1960
- Running time: 166 minutes
- Country: People's Republic of Poland
- Language: Polish
- Budget: zl 38,000,000
- Box office: zl 100,000,000 (by March 1961)

Knights of the Teutonic Order (Polish: Krzyżacy), also known as Knights of the Black Cross, is a 1960 Polish historical epic film adapted from a 1900 novel by Nobel laureate, Henryk Sienkiewicz. Directed by Aleksander Ford, it is one of the most successful movies in the cinema of Poland.

The plot centers on the Polish–Lithuanian–Teutonic War and the climactic Battle of Grunwald in 1410. For the battle scenes, 15,000 extras were hired. The release date of 15 July 1960 was the battle's 550th anniversary.

The film attracted huge audiences: it sold 14 million tickets in its first four years of release and had more than thirty million viewers as of 2000, making it the most popular film ever screened in Poland. It was later exported to 46 foreign countries, selling 29.6 million tickets in the Soviet Union and a further 2.6 million tickets in the Czechoslovak Socialist Republic. It was the most successful Polish film internationally and a Polish submission to the 33rd Academy Awards.

== Cast ==
- Grażyna Staniszewska as Danusia Jurandówna
- Urszula Modrzyńska as Jagienka ze Zgorzelic
- Mieczysław Kalenik as Zbyszko z Bogdańca
- Aleksander Fogiel as Maćko z Bogdańca
- Andrzej Szalawski as Jurand ze Spychowa, father of Danusia
- Leon Niemczyk as Fulko de Lorche
- Henryk Borowski as Zygfryd de Löwe
- Tadeusz Białoszczyński as Duke Janusz I of Warsaw
- Emil Karewicz as King Władysław Jagiełło
- Józef Kostecki as Lithuanian Grand Duke Vytautas the Great
- Lucyna Winnicka as Duchess Danutė of Lithuania, wife of Janusz I of Warsaw
- Cezary Julski as Zawisza Czarny
- Jerzy Kozakiewicz as Cztan z Rogowa
- Janusz Paluszkiewicz as royal marshall
- Jerzy Pichelski as Powala of Taczew
- Stanisław Jasiukiewicz as Grand Master of the Teutonic Knights Ulrich von Jungingen
- Mieczysław Voit as Kuno von Lichtenstein
- Janusz Strachocki as Grand Master of the Teutonic Knights Konrad von Jungingen
