= Ryszard Ber =

Film director and screenwriter (1933–2004)

- Born: 2 February 1933
- Died: 27 May 2004 (aged 71)
- Occupations: Film director and screenwriter

Ryszard Ber (2 February 1933 – 27 May 2004) was a film director and screenwriter.

== Biography ==
From 1989 to 1991 he was a member of Cinematography Committee.

== Filmography ==
Source.

- 1965: Zawsze w niedziele
- 1967: Gdzie jest trzeci król
- 1967: Ślepy tor
- 1968: Pożarowisko
- 1970: Kaszëbë
- 1973: Chłopcy
- 1976: Wergili
- 1977: Lalka (TV series)
- 1979: Hotel klasy lux
- 1980: Droga
- 1983: Thais
- 1986: Cudzoziemka
- 1989: Żelazną ręką
- 1991: Niech żyje miłość
- 1995: Kamień na kamieniu

== Accolades ==
In 1983 he received Knight's Cross of the Order of Polonia Restituta.
