= Argument About Basia =

1937 novel by Kornel Makuszyński

- Author: Kornel Makuszyński
- Original title: Awantura o Basię
- Language: Polish
- Genre: Novel
- Publication date: 1937
- Publication place: Poland
- Media type: Print (Hardback)

Argument About Basia (Polish: Awantura o Basię) is a Polish novel by Kornel Makuszyński, written in 1936, but released one year later.

== Plot ==
The book tells the story of a five-year old orphan girl, Basia, sent by train alone after her mother's death. When a piece of paper with the address of Basia's guardians is destroyed, Basia is taken by an actor who managed to read the address and takes the girl there. But he turns out to be wrong, and a famous writer Olszowski becomes Basia's guardian. Eventually the rightful guardian, Stanisława Olszańska appears, and Basia is placed under the joint guardiansip. The titular "argument about Basia" is between the two guardians, which ends in their marriage.

The second part of the novel starts ten years later. Basia finds her lost father, who suffers from memory loss, Basia's care of him helps him to regain his memory.

== Film adaptations ==
It was filmed twice – in 1959 and 1995, with a mini-series released in 1997 based on the 1995 film:

- pl:Awantura o Basię (film 1959)
- pl:Awantura o Basię (film 1995)
- pl:Awantura o Basię (serial telewizyjny)

=== 1959 version ===
Black-and-white movie directed by Maria Kaniewska.

- Małgorzata Piekarska as Basia
- Jerzy Duszyński as Mr Olszowski
- Ewa Krasnodębska as Miss Olszańska
- Roman Niewiarowicz as Walicki
- Mieczysław Gajda as Szot

=== 1995 and 1997 versions ===
- Agata Marciniak as little Basia
- Paulina Tworzyańska as teenage Basia
- Piotr Fronczewski as Mr Olszowski
- Maria Gładkowska as Miss Olszańska
- Andrzej Szczepkowski as Walicki
- Jan Jankowski as Szot
