= Antoni Lewek =

Polish Catholic priest and academic (1940–2010)

- Born: 14 January 1940; Kobyla Góra
- Died: 18 July 2010 (aged 70)

Academic background
- Education: Academy of Catholic Theology (mgr., PhD, dr hab.)

Antoni Lewek (14 January 1940 – 18 July 2010) was a Polish Catholic priest, theologian, and academic. He was the founder and first director of the Institute for Media Education and Journalism at Cardinal Stefan Wyszyński University in Warsaw.

Lewek was born in 1940 in Kobyla Góra to Antoni and Teresa Lewek; his father died in a concentration camp in 1943. He was first educated in his home village until he was 13, after which he attended a minor seminary in Gostyń between 1953 and 1957. After obtaining his matura, he began studying theology & philosophy at the archdiocesan seminary in Poznań. After completing his studies, he was ordained a priest on 26 May 1963 by Antoni Baraniak.

Between 1963 and 1967, Lewek underwent pastoral & preaching work in Buk and Leszno. On 1 October 1967, he began specialist studies in homiletics at the Academy of Catholic Theology in Warsaw, from which he obtained a magister degree in 1970. After attending the University of Vienna on scholarship and completing specialized studies at the Institut für Katechetik und Homiletik, he obtained a doctorate in June 1973 after defending his dissertation, Odnowa kaznodziejstwa w ujęciu Viktora Schurra na tle współczesnego ruchu homiletycznego. He received his habilitation in 1982 — making him the only person in Poland at the time to hold a postdoctoral degree in homiletics — and received the title of professor in 1995.

Between 1982 and 1987, Lewek served three terms as chairman of the homiletics section of the Polish Episcopal Conference's Committee on the Doctrine of the Faith. He served as head of the Department of Theology at the Academy of Catholic Theology between 1983 and 1999, where he created specialized studies on theology of social communication. In 2002, he founded the Institute for Media Education and Journalism, which was attached to Cardinal Stefan Wyszyński University. He died on 18 July 2010.

Lewek was an anticommunist, and protested in the aftermath of the death of slain priest Jerzy Popiełuszko.
