= Ateneum Theatre =

Theatre in Warsaw, Poland

Ateneum Theatre in Warsaw
- Teatr Ateneum w Warszawie
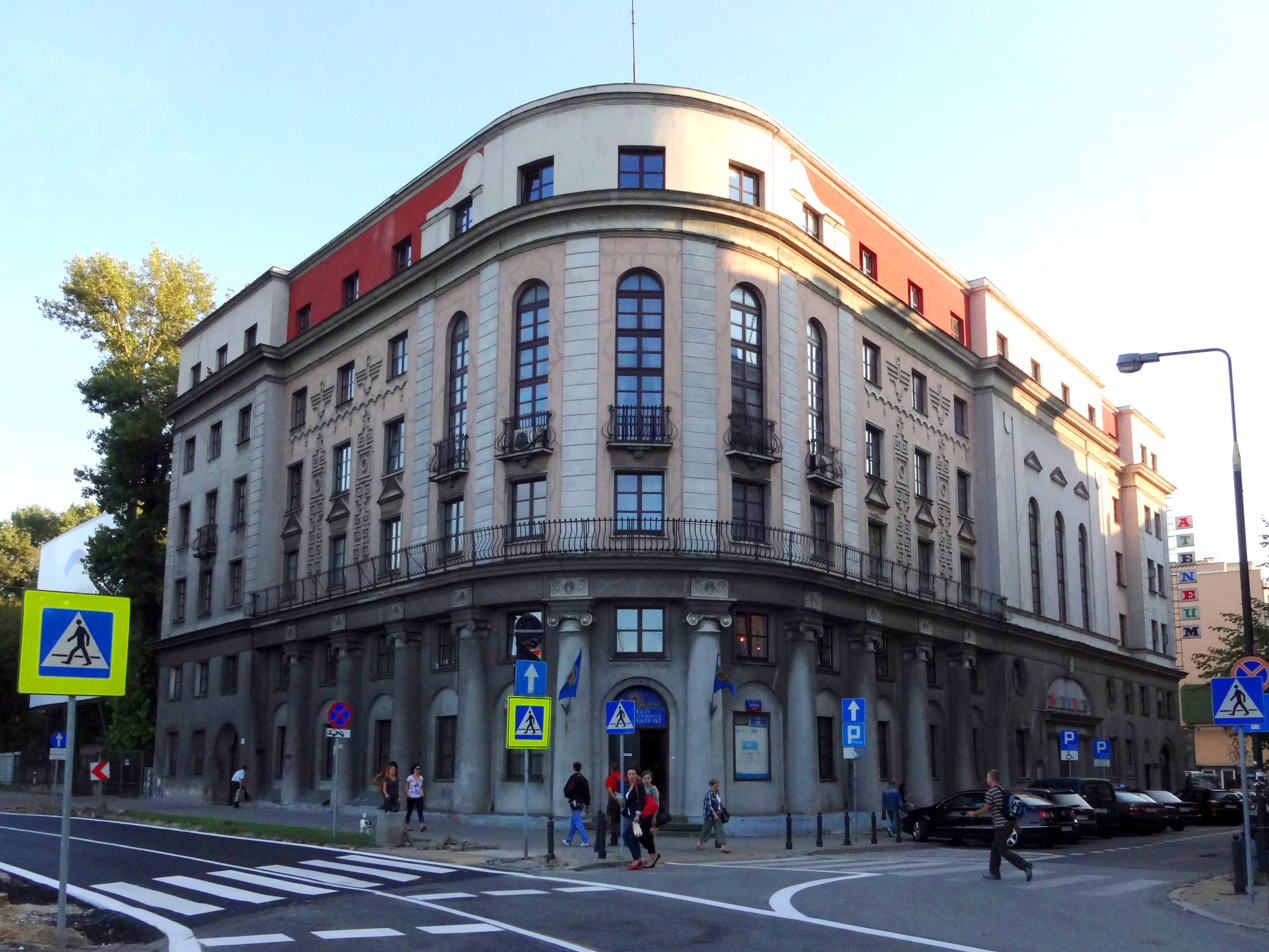
- Entrance to Ateneum Theatre
- Interactive map of Ateneum Theatre in Warsaw
- Address: ul. Jaracza 2 street Warsaw; Poland
- Coordinates: 52.23680°N 21.03202°E
- Owner: PKP
- Type: Dramatic theatre
- Public transit: Centrum Nauki Kopernik

Construction
- Opened: 1928
- Reopened: 1951

Website
- Theatre website

The Ateneum Theatre in Warsaw (Polish: Teatr Ateneum im. Stefana Jaracza w Warszawie) is a Polish dramatic theatre founded in 1928. It resides in a building erected a year earlier in the interwar Poland as headquarters for the Professional Union of PKP Railway Workers with offices upstairs. After World War II, the severely damaged structure was restored to its former glory with public funds. The state-run theatre reopened in 1951; named after its first and already famous prewar director Stefan Jaracz.

== History ==
The Ateneum Theatre began as an experimental stage with strong socio-political profile, under an Avant-garde-inspired name The Outpost of Spoken Word (Placówka Żywego Słowa). Its artistic manifesto was influenced by the mainly proletarian Warsaw neighbourhood of Powiśle in which it was established.

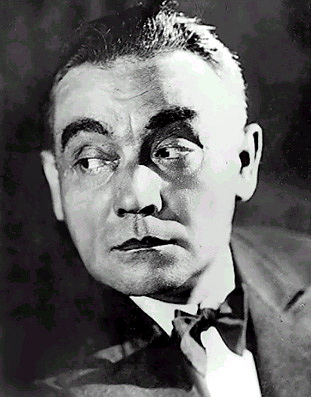
Dir. Stefan Jaracz

Two years into its existence, the artistic direction of Ateneum was taken over by popular actor Stefan Jaracz (1930). He worked there until the Nazi-Soviet invasion of Poland, sharing his responsibilities with Leon Schiller in 1932–33 season, and with Karol Adwentowicz (1934). Together, they raised the theatre's reputation as one of the leading voices for Poland's new intelligentsia. The groundbreaking performances included The Street Scene by Elmer Rice (1930), Danton's Death by Georg Büchner (1931), Senat Szaleńców by Holocaust victim Janusz Korczak (1931), the Tsar Lénine by François Porché (1932), and in the vein of political Zeittheater of the time, The Captain of Köpenick by Carl Zuckmayer (1932) and Roar China! by Sergei Tretyakov (1933); not to mention the popular Ladies and Husars (Damy i Huzary) by Aleksander Fredro (1932) and The Open House by Michał Bałucki.

The neighbourhood of Powiśle was almost completely destroyed by Nazi German bombardment during the Warsaw Uprising of 1944. The theatre was consumed by fire. It was practically rebuilt after the liberation, based on design by Wiktor Ballogh, with due consideration for its original look. The grand reopening took place on 22 July 1951, with the première of Intervention by Lev Slavin in the spirit of socialist-realist doctrine imposed by the Communist Party in Stalinist Poland. For the next forty years the theatre was under the direction of Janusz Warmiński (1922–1996) who managed to outlive and outgrow the Soviet system beyond the revolutions of 1989. Almost all prominent Polish actors performed at Ateneum throughout its existence including Jadwiga Andrzejewska, prof. Aleksander Bardini, Henryk Bista, Zbigniew Cybulski, Edward Dziewoński, Jerzy Duszyński, Tadeusz Fijewski, Adam Hanuszkiewicz, Gustaw Holoubek, Emil Karewicz, Bogumił Kobiela, Jan Kociniak, Agnieszka Osiecka, Aleksandra Śląska, and Roman Wilhelmi among others.
