= Zmiennicy =

Polish comedy television series

- DVD cover
- Genre: Comedy
- Created by: Stanisław Bareja
- Written by: Stanisław Bareja; Jacek Janczarski
- Directed by: Stanisław Bareja
- Starring: Ewa Błaszczyk; Mieczysław Hryniewicz
- Composer: Przemysław Gintrowski
- Country of origin: Poland
- Original language: Polish
- No. of seasons: 1
- No. of episodes: 15

Production
- Cinematography: Wojciech Jastrzębowski; Jan Muszyński
- Editor: Bogumiła Grzelak
- Running time: 53–64 minutes
- Production company: POLTEL

Original release
- Network: Telewizja Polska
- Release: 18 October 1987 – 12 February 1988

Related
- 4 Alternative Street

Zmiennicy (English: Subs) is a Polish comedy TV series that aired on TVP1 from 18 October 1987 to 12 February 1988. It was co-written and directed by Stanisław Bareja, and stars Ewa Błaszczyk and Mieczysław Hryniewicz in the leading roles of Katarzyna Piórecka and Jacek Żytkiewicz. Initially, Jadwiga Jankowska-Cieślak was supposed to play the female lead, but she declined; Krzysztof Stelmaszyk and Cezary Harasimowicz were considered for the male lead before Hryniewicz was cast.

The series had the working title Zawód – taksówkarz (English: Occupation: Taxi Driver). The shooting took place in 1985–86, with the series completed in autumn 1986. Filming locations include Warsaw, Drzymałowo, Zatory, Kraków and Grodzisk Mazowiecki (Poland), Bangkok (Thailand) and Berlin (West Germany).

Five DVD compilations were released by Carisma, each containing three episodes, with the first released on 12 October 2006, and the fifth on 22 February 2007. A complete boxset of the series was released on 11 July 2007.

== Synopsis ==
Jacek Żytkiewicz, a taxi driver for the Warsaw Taxi Company (WPT), drives a blue taxicab No. 1313 in turns with his sub Stanisław Lesiak. In an idiosyncratic accident, the cab is crushed by a falling mouse statue and Stanisław lands in the hospital.

Simultaneously, Kasia Piórecka works as a minibus driver for the Tuchola Forest Cooperative Communication Equipment Factory. After a sexual harassment attempt, she resigns from a job she never liked and applies to be a taxi driver for WPT, but her application is rejected due to safety concerns. At that time, the taxi driver was exclusively a male job in Poland and with several attacks on or even murders of taxi drivers it was believed that a woman might be even more prone to be attacked. This does not stop Kasia, and again, disguised en homme as Marian Koniuszko, she tries and becomes employed in WPT. She, being Marian (a male name in Polish), becomes a new sub of Jacek in a new, yellow-painted taxicab No. 1313.

Living a double life is a complicated endeavour. At certain point, Jacek meets Kasia in her female guise, falls in love and starts dating her. Jacek is unaware that his girlfriend is the same person who is his sub. Kasia is still not willing to reveal her double identity fearing losing her job. This state leads to many complicated situations. Things get even worse when it happens that their taxicab is a key instrument in a large heroin-smuggling plot and two rival gangs will try anything to regain it at any cost.

== Episodes ==
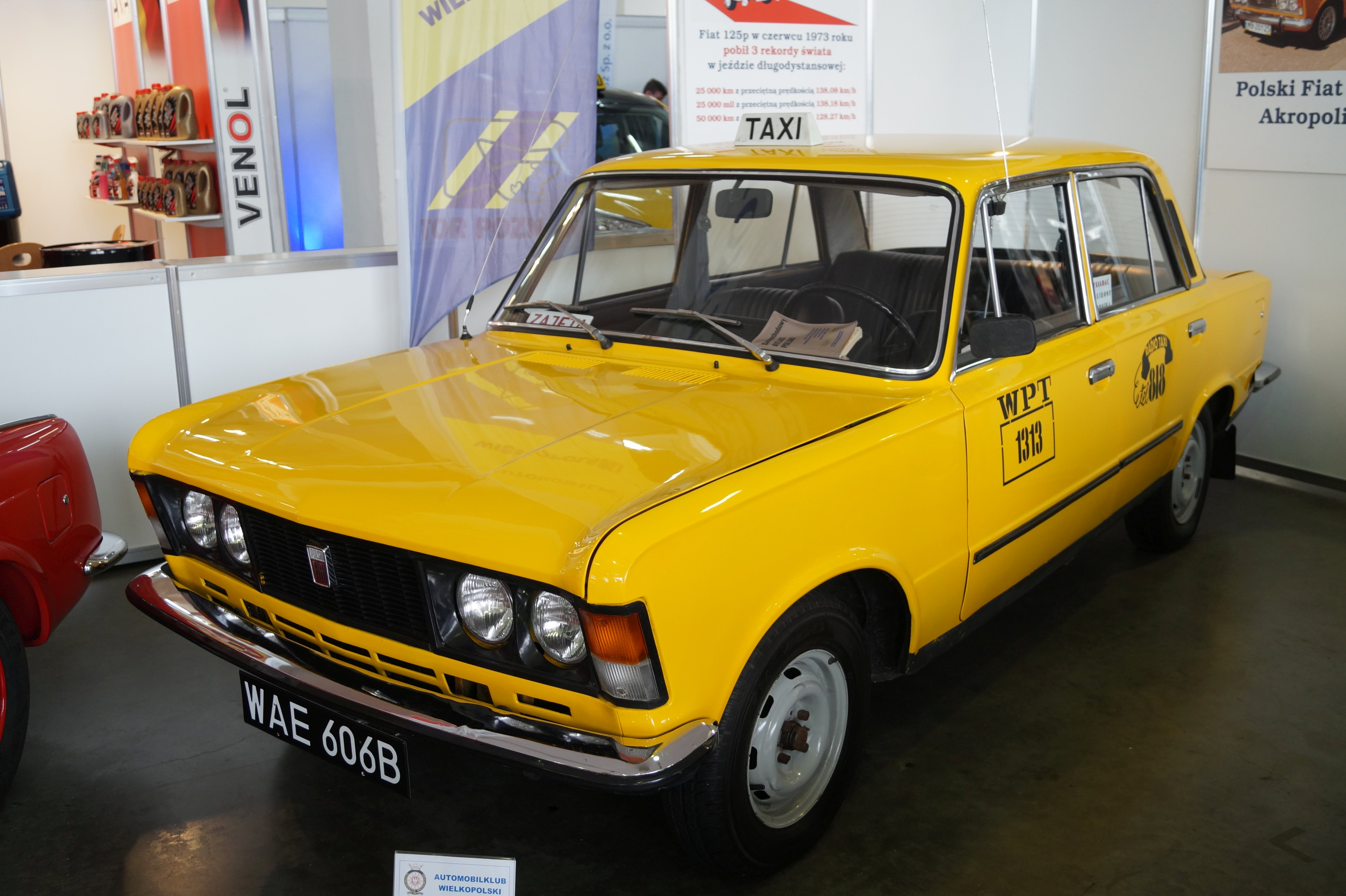
Polski Fiat 125p from Zmiennicy on display at Poznań Motor Show 2016

No.	Title	Directed by	Written by	Original release date
1	"Conventional Prices" (Polish: Ceny umowne)	Stanisław Bareja	Stanisław Bareja; Jacek Janczarski	18 October 1987
2	"The Last Run" (Polish: Ostatni kurs)	Stanisław Bareja	Stanisław Bareja; Jacek Janczarski	25 October 1987
3	"The Girl for Beating" (Polish: Dziewczyna do bicia)	Stanisław Bareja	Stanisław Bareja; Jacek Janczarski	20 November 1987
4	"A Typical Logic of Males and Females" (Polish: Typowa logika damsko-męska)	Stanisław Bareja	Stanisław Bareja; Jacek Janczarski	27 November 1987
5	"Safari" (Polish: Safari)	Stanisław Bareja	Stanisław Bareja; Jacek Janczarski	4 December 1987
6	"Special-Care Press" (Polish: Prasa szczególnej troski)	Stanisław Bareja	Stanisław Bareja; Jacek Janczarski	11 December 1987
7	"The Warsaw Middleman" (Polish: Warszawski łącznik)	Stanisław Bareja	Stanisław Bareja; Jacek Janczarski	18 December 1987
8	"Lucky Day" (Polish: Fartowny dzień)	Stanisław Bareja	Stanisław Bareja; Jacek Janczarski	25 December 1987
9	"Sentimental Trip" (Polish: Podróż sentymentalna)	Stanisław Bareja	Stanisław Bareja; Jacek Janczarski	1 January 1988
10	"Scream of Silence" (Polish: Krzyk ciszy)	Stanisław Bareja	Stanisław Bareja; Jacek Janczarski	8 January 1988
11	"Anticipation" (Polish: Antycypacja)	Stanisław Bareja	Stanisław Bareja; Jacek Janczarski	15 January 1988
12	"Citizen Monte Christo" (Polish: Obywatel Monte Christo)	Stanisław Bareja	Stanisław Bareja; Jacek Janczarski	22 January 1988
13	"Meetings with Themis" (Polish: Spotkania z Temidą)	Stanisław Bareja	Stanisław Bareja; Jacek Janczarski	29 January 1988
14	"Kiss Me, Kate" (Polish: Pocałuj mnie Kasiu)	Stanisław Bareja	Stanisław Bareja; Jacek Janczarski	5 February 1988
15	"Our Precious" (Polish: Nasz najdroższy)	Stanisław Bareja	Stanisław Bareja; Jacek Janczarski	12 February 1988

== Cast ==
- Ewa Błaszczyk – Katarzyna Piórecka/Marian Koniuszko
- Mieczysław Hryniewicz – Jacek Żytkiewicz
- Bronisław Pawlik – Stanisław Lesiak
- Piotr Pręgowski – Krashan Bhamradżanga
- Irena Kwiatkowska – Kasia's mother
- Kazimierz Kaczor – Zenon Kuśmider
- Wojciech Pokora – Antoni Klusek
- Jerzy Przybylski – Hans Gonschorek
- Krzysztof Kowalewski – Tomasz Michalik
- Marian Opania – Ceglarek
- Artur Barciś – Wiesio Ceglarek
- Dariusz Kowalski – Adam Kuberski
- Stanisława Celińska – Lusia Walicka
- Mariusz Benoit – Jan Oborniak
- Marzena Trybała – Oborniakowa
- Krzysztof Zaleski – Łukasik
- Stanisław Bareja – Krokodylowy (Crocodile Man)
- Ignacy Machowski – Kasia's father
- Marcel Szytenchelm – Marian Koniuszko
- Mariusz Dmochowski – Tadeusz Koniuszko
- Janusz Rewiński – Mroczkowski
- Krystyna Kołodziejczyk – Koniuszkowa
- Zdzisław Wardejn – Waldemar Barewicz
- Jan Englert – Rawicz
- Włodzimierz Stępiński – Mr. Andrzej's man
- Mieczysław Czechowicz – Mastalerz
- Daniel Kozakiewicz – Kasia's brother
- Gustaw Lutkiewicz – Samelko
- Adam Ferency – police officer Borkowski
- Jerzy Markuszewski – WPT manager
- Jan Kobuszewski – Ksywa
- Cezary Harasimowicz – Wojtek, Kluska's driver
- Zbigniew Zamachowski – Henio's brother
- Anna Gornostaj – Maria Grzybianka
- Tomasz Dedek – Mr. Andrzej, pimp
- Zdzisław Rychter – waiter from Kutno
- Krystyna Tkacz – Michalikowa
- Katarzyna Skawina – Flora, Michalik's lover
- Anna Sobik – Marysia, WPT controller
- Alicja Migulanka – Ołtarzewska
- Wojciech Jastrzębowski – TVP operator in Thailand
- Wiesław Znyk – TVP soundman in Thailand
- Hanna Lachmann – Lesiakowa
- Marek Siudym – Stefan Parzydlak
- Stefan Friedmann – senior lecturer from 4 Alternative Street
- Leopold Matuszczak – Kalina, customs officer from Okęcie
- Antonina Girycz – Biernacka
- Maria Klejdysz – Lewandowska
- Włodzimierz Bednarski – judge
- Andrzej Piszczatowski – Attorney Brok
- Paweł Nowisz – FSO manager
- Jerzy Kozakiewicz – Garwanko
- Jacek Domański – Tadzio Karski
- Jan Łopuszniak – Karter
- Teresa Violetta Buhl – woman conveying a mouse statue
- Cezary Domagała – Krashan's college
- Aleksander Trąbczyński – Mroczek
- Barbara Dziekan – Bożena Mroczkowska
- Andrzej Grąziewicz – Woźniak
- Cezary Julski – WPT auction participant
- Wiesława Mazurkiewicz – judge Zembrzuska
- Paweł Galia – property master
- Paweł Szczesny – Mr. Andrzej's man
- Grzegorz Wons – doctor
- Dariusz Odija – Skoczylas
