= List of films set in Warsaw =

Since World War II Warsaw has been the second most important centre of film production in Poland. As the capital of Poland it has also been featured in countless films, both Polish and foreign. The following is a list of such films.

== Polish ==
- Love Is For Everyone (Każdemu wolno kochać, 1933) – directed by Mieczysław Krawicz
- Jego ekscelencja subiekt (1933)
- Antek the Police Chief (Antek Policmajster, 1935) – directed by Michał Waszyński
- Kochaj tylko mnie (1935)
- The Treasure (Skarb, 1948) – directed by Leonard Buczkowski
- Adventure in Marienstadt (Przygoda na Mariensztacie, 1953) – directed by Leonard Buczkowski
- Five Boys from Barska Street (Piątka z ulicy Barskiej, 1954) - directed by Aleksander Ford
- A Generation (Pokolenie, 1954) – directed by Andrzej Wajda
- Warszawa 1905 roku (1955)
- Irena do domu! (1955) – directed by Jan Fethke
- Kanal (Kanał, 1956) – directed by Andrzej Wajda
- Nikodem Dyzma (1956) – directed by Jan Rybkowski
- Heroism (Eroica, 1957) – directed by Andrzej Munk
- Answer to Violence (Zamach, 1958) – directed by Jerzy Passendorfer
- Ashes and Diamonds (Popioł i diament, 1958) – directed by Andrzej Wajda
- Octopus Cafe (Cafe Pod Minogą, 1959) – directed by Bronisław Brok
- My Old Man (Mój stary, 1962) – directed by Janusz Nasfeter
- Penguin (Pingwin, 1964) – directed by Jerzy Stefan Stawiński
- Paris - Warsaw Without a Visa (Paryż – Warszawa bez wizy, 1967) – directed by Hieronim Przybył
- Samson – directed by Andrzej Wajda (1967)
- The Cruise (Rejs, 1970) – directed by Marek Piwowski
- Man-Woman Wanted (Poszukiwany, poszukiwana, 1972) – directed by Stanisław Bareja
- A Jungle Book of Regulations (Nie ma róży bez ognia, 1974) – directed by Stanisław Bareja
- What Will You Do When You Catch Me? (Co mi zrobisz jak mnie złapiesz, 1978) – directed by Stanisław Bareja
- Wherever You Are, Mr. President (Gdziekolwiek jesteś, panie prezydencie, 1978) – directed by Andrzej Trzos-Rastawiecki
- Without Anesthesia (Bez znieczulenia, 1978) – directed by Andrzej Wajda
- Teddy Bear (Miś, 1980) – directed by Stanisław Bareja
- Korczak – directed by Andrzej Wajda (1990)
- Calls Controlled (Rozmowy kontrolowane, 1991) – directed by Sylwester Chęciński
- The Crowned-Eagle Ring (Pierścionek z orłem w koronie, 1992) – directed by Andrzej Wajda
- Warsaw - Year 5703 (Warszawa. Annee 5703, 1992) – directed by Janusz Kijowski
- Avalon – directed by Mamoru Oshii (2001)
- Warsaw (Warszawa, 2003) – directed by Dariusz Gajewski
- Nigdy w życiu! – directed by Ryszard Zatorski (2004)

== Foreign ==
- To Be or Not to Be – directed by Ernst Lubitsch (1942)
- The Night of the Generals – directed by Anatole Litvak (1967)
- The Minor Apocalypse – directed by Costa-Gavras (1993)
- Leningrad Cowboys Meet Moses – directed by Aki Kaurismäki (1994)
- Avalon – directed by Mamoru Oshii (2001)
- The Foreigner – directed by Michael Oblowitz (2002)
- The Pianist – directed by Roman Polański (2002)
- The Aryan Couple – directed by John Daly (2004)
- Karol: A Man Who Became Pope – directed by Giacomo Battiato (2005)
- Kick - directed by Sajid Nadiadwala (2014)
