= Zofia Czerwińska =

Polish actress (1933–2019)

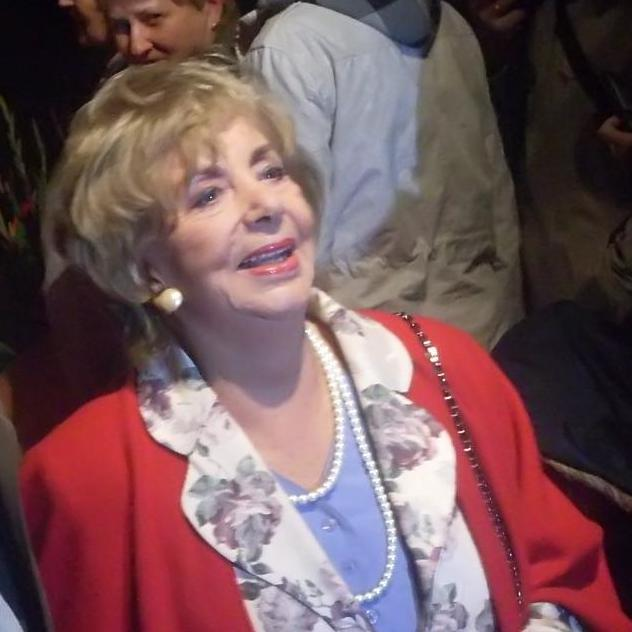
- at Gdynia Film Festival
- Born: 19 March 1933; Poznań
- Died: 13 March 2019 (aged 85); Warsaw

Zofia Czerwińska (19 March 1933 – 13 March 2019) was a Polish actress known for her role in the TV series Alternatives 4 in the role of Zofia Balcerkowa.

== Life ==
Czerwińska was born in 1933 in Poznań. She was the only child of Marian and Anna Urszula of the Czerwiński family. She attended the V (five) High school in Gdansk and was said to be an outstanding post-war alumnae. She studied drama at the theatre in Krakow.

She had a long acting career in film and television taking 150 different roles. She was particularly remembered for her role in the TV series Alternatives 4 in the role of Zofia Balcerkowa. She was active in campaigning for animal rights and to curb homophobia.

Czerwińska died in Warsaw in 2019. She had undergone surgery, against expert advice, and had not recovered. Her ashes were buried at the Northern Communal Cemetery in Warsaw (Wólka Węglowa). Mourners included Mariusz Szczygieł, Marian Opania, Radosław Piwowarski, Teresa Lipowska and Ewa Wiśniewska.

== Private life ==
She married twice but she divorced her first husband because he was unfaithful and lost the second because she was unfaithful. She had no children.

== Filmography ==
Year	Title	Role	Notes
1955	A Generation	Bartender Lola	
1958	Eroica	Jogodka	(segment "Scherzo alla Polacca")
1958	Ashes and Diamonds	Barmaid Lili	
1963	Gangsterzy i filantropi	Bartender	Uncredited
1963	Przygoda noworoczna	New Year's Eve party partaker	Uncredited
1964	Dwa zebra Adama	mieszkanka Godów protestujaca pod domem Wiktusów	
1964	Skapani w ogniu	Repatriate on the Truck	Uncredited
1964	Prawo i pięść	Woman	
1965	Three Steps on Earth	Waitress	(segment "Rozwód po Polsku")
1966	Wieczór przedswiateczny		
1966	Lekarstwo na milosc	Waitress	Uncredited
1966	Pieklo i niebo	Angel	Uncredited
1967	Mocne uderzenie	Asystentka na konkursie piosenki	
1968	Dancing w kwaterze Hitlera	Tourist	
1968	The Doll	Woman at Hopfer's	Uncredited
1969	Czlowiek z M-3	Tenant	Uncredited
1969	Zbrodniarz, który ukradl zbrodnie	Apolonia M. (witness)	
1970	Nowy	Cookie	
1970	Paragon, gola!		
1970	The Cruise	Passenger	Uncredited
1970	Maly	Worker Hotel Manager	
1971	I Hate Mondays	Woman in 'Maszynohurt'	Uncredited
1971	Jeszcze slychac spiew i rzenie koni	Misztal's daughter	
1971	Klopotliwy gosc	Woman with Key	
1972	Zabijcie czarna owce		
1972	A Slip-up	Woman at accident	Uncredited
1973	Man – Woman Wanted	Tenant	
1975	Strach	Management woman	Uncredited
1976	Obrazki z zycia	Judge	
1976	Con amore	Nurse	
1976	Motylem jestem, czyli romans czterdziestolatka	Zosia Nowosielska	
1976	Brunet wieczorową porą	Jola	
1977	Sprawa Gorgonowej	woman in the courtroom in Lviv	Uncredited
1978	Wesela nie bedzie	Nurse	Uncredited
1980	Wsciekly	Neighbour	Uncredited
1980	Golem	Toilet Grandma	
1981	Teddy Bear	Candidate for Irena Ochódzka	
1983	Okno	Neighbour	
1983	Jesli sie odnajdziemy	Ziebinska	
1983	Odwet	Uczestniczka zjazdu	
1985	Och, Karol	Karol's Mother	
1986	Rajska jablon	Kwiryna's Aunt	
1988	Sonata marymoncka	Tram passenger	
1991	Just Beyond This Forest	Woman on the Train	
1991	Dziecko szczescia	Woman from Orphanage	
1992	Wielka wsypa		
2002	The Pianist	Woman with Soup	
2003	King Ubu	Czlonek ludu	
2009	Zloty srodek	Wacia	
2009	Mniejsze zlo	Kiosk keeper	
2010	Milczenie jest zlotem	Tarot Master	
2011	Wojna zensko-meska	Old Lady	
2013	Kanadyjskie sukienki	Stefka	
2016	Przystanek do nieba	Grazyna Kos Branicka	
2018	Verliebt in Masuren	Tante Grazyna	(final film role)
