= Kwadrat Theatre =

Theatre in Warsaw, Poland

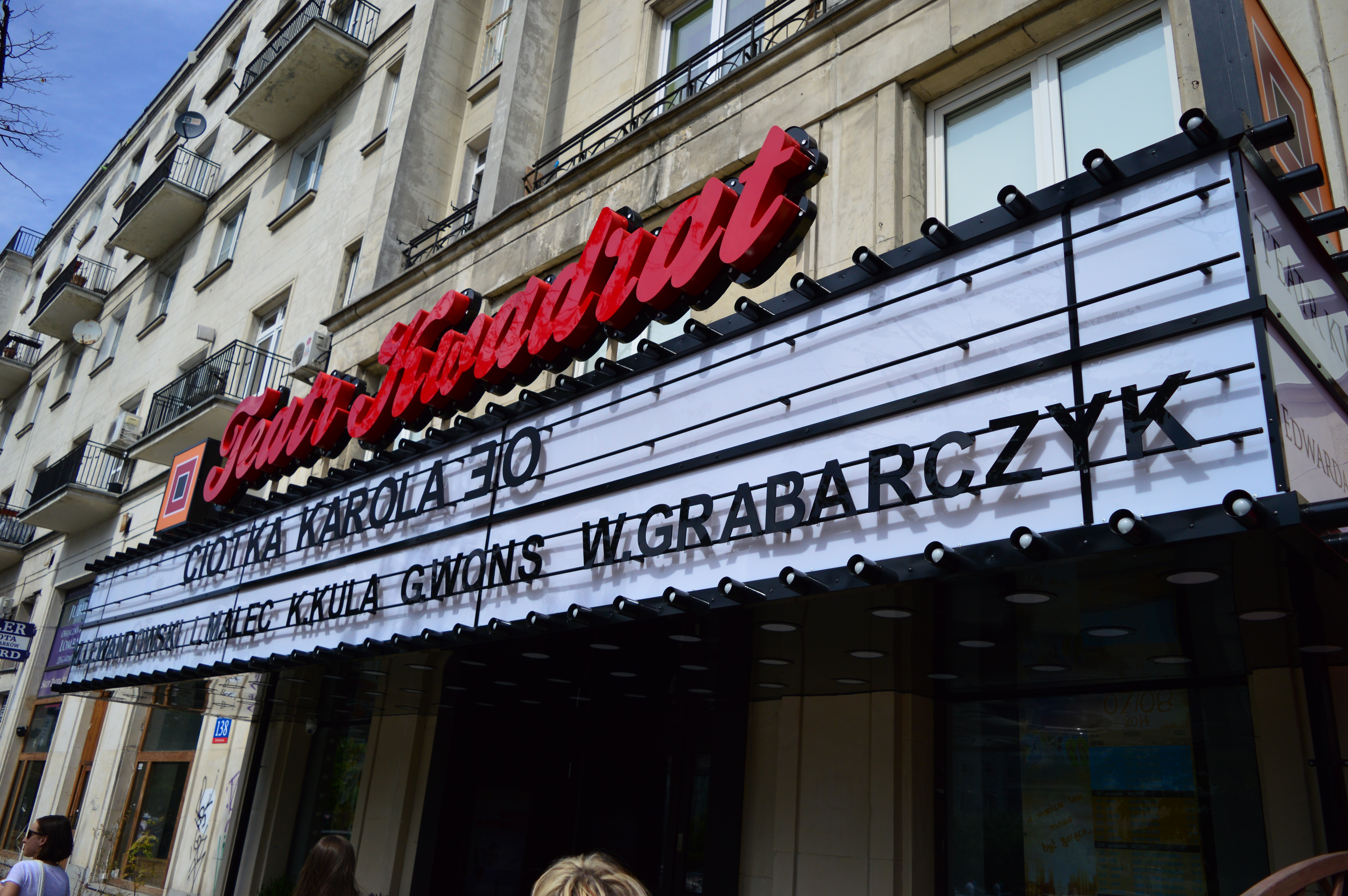

The Kwadrat Theatre (Polish: Teatr Kwadrat im. Edwarda Dziewońskiego, "Edward Dziewoński Square Theatre") is theatre in Warsaw, Poland located at 138 Marszałkowska Street. It was established in 1974. Its production has been mainly comedies.

== History ==
Teatr Kwadrat was established in 1974 on the initiative of the Radio and Television Committee. Edward Dziewoński became the first director of the theater. During the martial law in 1982, the theater ceased to function. However, it became the second stage of the Theater Na Woli. In 1985, when the Theater Na Woli was closed and the stage was returned to the National Theater, the Kwadrat Theater was reactivated by the decision of the then Mayor of Warsaw, Mieczysław Dębicki. Edmund Kamil Karwański became the director and held this position until June 30, 2010. On July 15, 2010, Andrzej Nejman became the director of the Kwadrat Theater.

The theater hosted great figures of the Polish stage, including Ewa Wiśniewska, Halina Kowalska, Stanisława Celińska, Irena Kwiatkowska, Barbara Rylska, Małgorzata Foremniak, Janusz Gajos, Krzysztof Kowalewski, Jerzy Bończak, Jerzy Turek, Jan Kociniak, Wojciech Pokora and Tomasz Stockinger. It presents works by outstanding English and American authors, Polish authors.

The theater mainly stages comedy and contemporary farces.

== Previous locations ==
- ul. Czackiego 15/17 (1974–2009)
- al. Niepodległości 141 (2010–2016)

== Directors ==
- Edward Dziewoński (1974–1982)
- Theatre did not operate (1982–1985)
- Edmund Kamil Karwański (1985–2010)
- Andrzej Nejman (2010-)
