= Being Forty =

Polish television series

- Genre: Sitcom; Comedy drama
- Created by: Jerzy Gruza and Krzysztof Teodor Toeplitz
- Directed by: Jerzy Gruza
- Starring: Andrzej Kopiczyński, Anna Seniuk, Irena Kwiatkowska
- Country of origin: Poland
- Original language: Polish
- No. of seasons: 2
- No. of episodes: 21

Production
- Running time: 50 minutes
- Production company: Telewizja Polska (TVP)

Original release
- Release: 1975 – 1978

Being Forty (Polish: Czterdziestolatek, alt. spelling: 40-latek, lit.: The Forty-Year-Old Man) is a Polish television comedy series originally broadcast in Poland between 1975 and 1978. The initial series enjoyed so much popularity that it was continued and led to the release of a feature film I'm a Butterfly, a 40-year-old's Love Affair and a New Year's Eve television program in 1975.

The series was written by Jerzy Gruza and Krzysztof Teodor Toeplitz and was broadcast on Telewizja Polska. In total, 21 episodes were produced.

The series followed the fate of a Warsaw family and explored topics related to midlife crisis, such as extra-marital affairs, attempts to quit smoking, obsession with hair loss, efforts to maintain physical fitness, pride in achievements and professional life, the desire to seek self-fulfillment through social activities, etc.

20 years later the series was remade in the mid-1990s with a cast that included Joanna Kurowska, Wojciech Mann and Wojciech Malajkat.

== Episodes ==
1. The toast, or closer than further (Toast czyli bliżej niż dalej) 1974
2. Struggle with addiction, or maze (Walka z nałogiem czyli labirynt)
3. Come by whenever you'd like, or dulled stimuli (Wpadnij kiedy zechcesz czyli bodźce stępione)
4. The portrait, or how to be loved (Portret czyli jak być kochanym)
5. Physical fitness, or the fight against the birth certificate (Kondycja fizyczna czyli walka z metryką)
6. Flora's hair, or the maze (Włosy Flory czyli labirynt)
7. Judym or a social action (Judym czyli czyn społeczny)
8. Opening of the route, or free time (Otwarcie trasy czyli czas wolny) 1975
9. Family, or strangers at home (Rodzina czyli obcy w domu) 1975
10. Postcard from Spitsbergen, or enchantment (Pocztówka ze Spitzbergenu czyli oczarowanie) 1975
11. Somebody else's misery, or defense witness (Cudze nieszczęście czyli świadek obrony) 1975
12. New deputy, or the meteor (Nowy zastępca czyli meteor) 1975
13. The scapegoat, or the rotation (Kozioł ofiarny czyli rotacja) 1975
14. Małkiewicz case or kamikaze (Sprawa Małkiewicza czyli kamikadze) 1976
15. Expensive gift or revisit (Kosztowny drobiazg czyli rewizyta) 1976
16. Where have you been or Shakespeare (Gdzie byłaś czyli Szekspir) 1976
17. A cunning beast, or the cristal (Cwana bestia czyli kryształ) 1977
18. War game or on the billet (Gra wojenna czyli na kwaterze) 1977
19. Away from people, or something of your own (Z dala od ludzi czyli coś swojego)
20. In self-defense, or the hunt (W obronie własnej czyli polowanie)
21. Shadow-line, or the first serious warning (Smuga cienia czyli pierwsze poważne ostrzeżenie) 1977

== Cast ==
- Andrzej Kopiczyński as Stefan Karwowski, Czterdziestolatek
- Anna Seniuk as Magda Karwowska, wife of Stefan Karwowski
- Irena Kwiatkowska
- Roman Kłosowski
- Janusz Kłosiński
- Leonard Pietraszak
- Janusz Gajos
- Halina Kossobudzka
- Władysław Hańcza
- Wojciech Pokora
- Katarzyna Łaniewska
- Mieczysław Waśkowski
- Zdzisław Maklakiewicz
- Bohdan Ejmont
- Ryszard Pietruski
- Stefan Friedmann
- Stanisław Tym
- Wacław Kowalski
- Jarosław Skulski
- Leon Niemczyk
- Grażyna Szapołowska
- Alina Janowska
- Bożena Dykiel
- Edward Dziewoński
- Piotr Fronczewski
- Tadeusz Pluciński
- Lech Ordon
- Wojciech Pszoniak
- Jan Pietrzak
- Krystyna Feldman
- Jerzy Turek
- Joanna Szczepkowska
- Wiesław Gołas
- Jan Kobuszewski
- Andrzej Krasicki
- Aleksander Sewruk
- Jan Kociniak
- Krzysztof Kowalewski
