= Zofia Merle =

Polish actress (1938–2023)

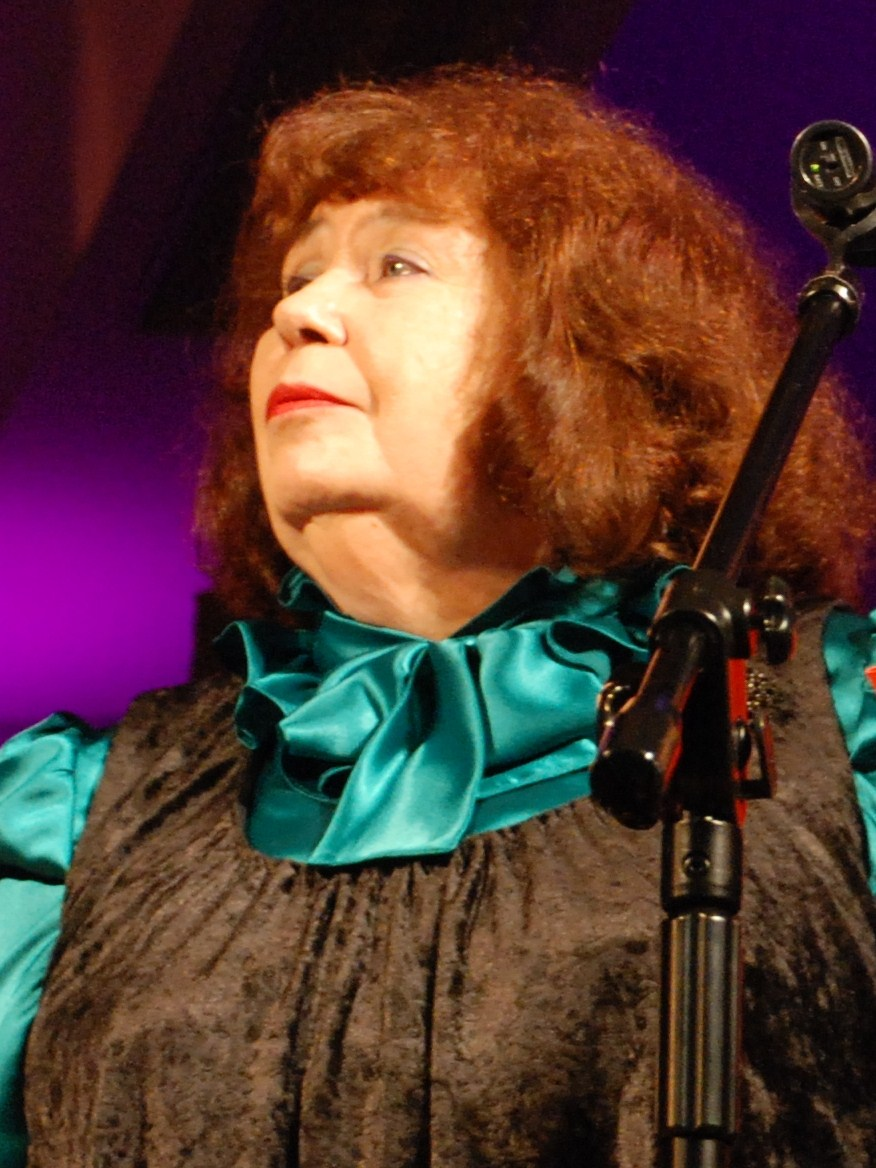
- Merle in 2007
- Born: 30 March 1938; Warsaw, Poland
- Died: 13 December 2023 (aged 85); Warsaw, Poland
- Years active: 1956–2013; 2018
- Spouse: Jan Mayzel

Zofia Merle (30 March 1938 – 13 December 2023) was a Polish character actress. She made over 75 appearances in film and television. She starred in the 1978 comedy film What Will You Do When You Catch Me?. Merle died on 13 December 2023, at the age of 85.

== Filmography ==
- 1961: Komedianty as Young Actress (directed by: Maria Kaniewska)
- 1962: Jadą goście, jadą as Maryna
- 1964: Agnieszka 46 as Pela (directed by: Sylwester Chęciński)
- 1965: Katastrofa as Zofia (directed by: Sylwester Chęciński)
- 1966: The Codes as Wacka (directed by: Wojciech Jerzy Has)
- 1969: Rzeczpospolita babska as Irena Molenda
- 1973: The Peasants as Magda Kozlowa (directed by: Jan Rybkowski)
- 1975: Nights and Days as peasant Maria Kałużna
- 1978: What Will You Do When You Catch Me? as Krzakoski's domestic servant (directed by: Stanisław Bareja)
- 1981: Teddy Bear as Tradeswoman (directed by: Stanisław Bareja)
- 1985: Memoirs of a Sinner as Weaver's wife (directed by: Wojciech Jerzy Has)
- 1988: The Tribulations of Balthazar Kober as Matron (directed by: Wojciech Jerzy Has)
- 1990: Eminent Domain as Woman in Party (directed by: John Irvin)
- 1991: Calls Controlled as Maria Wafel
- 1993: Bye Bye America as Genowefa (directed by: Jan Schütte)
- 2001: Cats & Dogs as Sophie (Polish dubbing)
- 2002: Chopin: Desire for Love as Cook Zuzanna
- 2002: Day of the Wacko as Woman with dog
- 2006: We're All Christs as Woman
- 2007: Ryś as Maria Wafel

== Television ==
- 1964: Barbara and Jan (First Polish TV series)
- 1976: 07 Come In
- 1983: Alternatywy 4
- 1998–2013, 2018: Klan as Stefania Wróbel-Malec (permanent cast)
- 1999–2003: Na dobre i na złe
- 2000: Świat według Kiepskich (Episode number 42)
- 2008–2009: Tylko miłość
- 2009: Niania
