= A Jungle Book of Regulations =

1974 Polish comedy film

Nie ma róży bez ognia
- DVD cover for Nie ma róży bez ognia
- Directed by: Stanisław Bareja
- Written by: Stanisław Bareja; Jacek Fedorowicz
- Produced by: Stefan Adamek
- Starring: Jacek Fedorowicz; Stanisław Tym
- Cinematography: Andrzej Ramlau
- Edited by: Alina Faflik
- Music by: Waldemar Kazanecki
- Release date: 25 December 1974
- Running time: 91 minutes
- Language: Polish

Nie ma róży bez ognia (title in Polish: There is no rose without fire, in reference to two mixed up proverbs – There is no rose without thorns, and There is no smoke without the fire) is a Polish comedy film from 1974 directed by Stanisław Bareja. The subject is the chronic apartment shortage in Communist Poland.

The film has been released for the English speaking world with subtitles, under the title: A Jungle Book of Regulations.

== Cast ==
- Jerzy Dobrowolski - as Jerzy Dąbczak (Wanda's former husband)
- Jacek Fedorowicz - as Jan Filikiewicz
- Halina Kowalska - as Wanda Filikiewicz
- Stanisław Tym - as Zenek (Lusia's fiancé)
- Stanisława Celińska - as Lusia
- Mieczysław Czechowicz - as Lusia's father
- Wiesław Gołas - as Malinowski (prospective client)
- Bronisław Pawlik - administrator
- Wojciech Siemion - school principal
- Henryk Kluba - as Bogusław Poganek (neighbour)
- Bohdan Łazuka - as Francik (passenger)
- Jan Kobuszewski - postman
- Wojciech Pokora - customer
- Jan Himilsbach - grounds' keeper
- Kazimierz Kaczor - male nurse
- Jadwiga Chojnacka - vendor
- Ewa Pokas - mail clerk
- Maria Chwalibóg - tenant
- Cezary Julski - attendant
- Monika Sołubianka - as prostitute Zuzia
- Jolanta Lothe - as Mrs Korbaczewska
- Krzysztof Kowalewski - militiaman
- Jerzy Januszewicz - mailman
- Agnieszka Fitkau-Perepeczko - tenant
- Jerzy Moes - customer

== Notes and references ==
- A Jungle Book of Regulations at IMDb
