= Husband of His Wife =

- Directed by: Jakub Goldberg; Stanisław Bareja
- Written by: Jerzy Jurandot (play); Stanisław Bareja
- Starring: Bronisław Pawlik; Aleksandra Zawieruszanka
- Cinematography: Jan Janczewski
- Music by: Marek Sart
- Release date: 4 April 1961
- Running time: 94 minutes
- Country: Poland
- Language: Polish

Husband of His Wife (Polish: Mąż swojej żony) is a Polish comedy from 1960 directed by Stanisław Bareja and based upon the play by Jerzy Jurandot.

== Starring ==
- Bronisław Pawlik as composer Michał Karcz
- Aleksandra Zawieruszanka as sprinter Jadwiga Fołtasiówna-Karcz
- Mieczysław Czechowicz as coach Mamczyk
- Elżbieta Czyżewska as Renata daughter of professor Trębski
- Wiesław Gołas as boxer Józek Ciapuła
- Wanda Łuczycka as Kowalska, Karczes housekeeper
- Wojciech Pokora

== Plot ==
The story of a newly married couple, Michał Karcz (composer) and sprinter Jadwiga Fołtasiówna-Karcz. Michał has to adjust to Jadwiga being much more famous and her fame and needs dominating their lives.
