= Adam Mularczyk =

Polish theatre director and radio/film actor

Adam Mularczyk (January 19, 1923 in Poland – June 12, 1996 in Philadelphia) was a Polish theatre director and radio and film actor. He emigrated to the USA in 1974. Mularczyk is interred at Our Lady of Czestochowa Cemetery in Doylestown, PA.

== Films ==
- 1972: Poszukiwany, poszukiwana
- 1971: Milion za Laurę
- 1971: Nie lubię poniedziałku
- 1966: Pieczone gołąbki
- 1965: Popioły
- 1961: Dwaj panowie N
- 1961: Milczące ślady
- 1957: Król Maciuś I
