= Stanisław Tym =

Polish actor, writer and director (1937–2024)

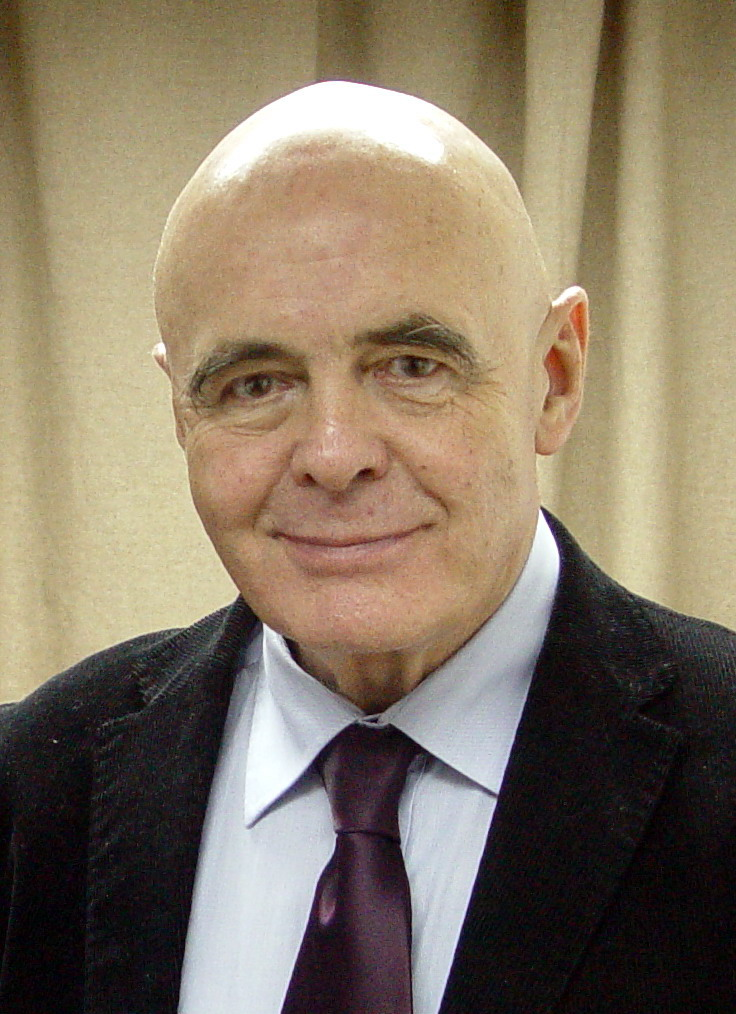
- Tym in 2010
- Born: Stanisław Aleksy Tym; 17 July 1937; Małkinia Górna, Poland
- Died: 6 December 2024 (aged 87)
- Occupations: Actor; director
- Years active: 1959–2024

Stanisław Aleksy Tym (Polish pronunciation: [staˈɲiswaf tɨm]; 17 July 1937 – 6 December 2024) was a Polish actor, comedian, journalist, and satirist, as well as a film and theatre director and writer.

== Career ==
Tym co-produced and starred in many films by Stanisław Bareja. He gained much fame for his performance in the cult film by Marek Piwowski, Rejs (The Cruise). In another cult film, Teddy Bear, he co-authored the script and played two main roles.

In the 1990s, he was a columnist for the popular Polish news magazine Wprost, later writing for the newspaper Rzeczpospolita and for Polityka starting in 2007.

He was the winner of many awards, including the Nagroda Kisiela for best columnist in 1998.

== Death ==
Tym died on 6 December 2024, at the age of 87.

== Works ==
=== Director ===
- Rozmowy przy wycinaniu lasu (1998)
- Dick (Ryś (Film), (2007)

=== Scripts ===
- Brunet Will Call (Brunet wieczorową porą, 1976)
- What Will You Do When You Catch Me? (Co mi zrobisz, jak mnie złapiesz?, 1978)
- Teddy Bear (Miś, 1980)
- Calls Controlled (Rozmowy kontrolowane, 1991)
- Rozmowy przy wycinaniu lasu (1998)
- Ryś, (2007)

=== Actor ===
- Octopus Cafe (Cafe Pod Minogą, 1959) – Partisan
- Nobody's Calling (Nikt nie woła, 1960)
- Kwiecień (1961) – Medic
- Penguin (Pingwin (Film), 1965) – Osetnik
- Walkower (Walkower (Film), 1965)
- Barrier (Bariera (Film), 1966) – Waiter
- Paris – Warsaw without Passport (Paryż – Warszawa bez wizy (Film), 1967) – American Soldier
- Hole in the Earth (Dziura w Ziemi (Film), 1970) – Member of Scientific Debate
- The Cruise (Rejs (Film), 1970) – Stowaway/Political Cultural Attaché
- Civil the Police Dog (Przygody psa Cywila (Film), 1971) – Thief
- A Jungle Book of Regulations (Nie ma róży bez ognia, 1974) – Zenek
- Czterdziestolatek (The Forty Year Old One) (Czterdziestolatek, 1974–1977) – Construction Worker
- Niespotykanie spokojny człowiek (Incredibly peaceful man) (Niespotykanie spokojny człowiek (Film), 1975) – Captain
- The Shadow Line (Smuga cienia (Film), 1976) – Jacobus
- What Will You Do When You Catch Me? (Co mi zrobisz, jak mnie złapiesz?, 1978) – Dudała / Szymek
- Teddy Bear (Miś, 1980) – Ryszard Ochódzki / Stanisław Paluch
- The War of the Worlds: Next Century (Wojna światów – Następne stulecie, 1981) – Secret Agent
- Calls Controlled (Rozmowy kontrolowane, 1991) – Ryszard Ochódzki
- Agata's Abduction (Uprowadzenie Agaty, 1993) – Homeless
- Rozmowy przy wycinaniu lasu (1998)
- Czy można się przysiąść (1999)
- Baśń o ludziach stąd (2003)
- The Incredibles (Iniemamocni, 2003) – Gilbert Huph (Polish Language Version)
- Dick (Ryś (Film), 2007) – Ryszard Ochódzki
- Niania (2008) – Czesław
- Only Love (Tylko miłość, 2008) – Mr. Sztern
