= Jolanta Lothe =

Polish actress (1942–2022)

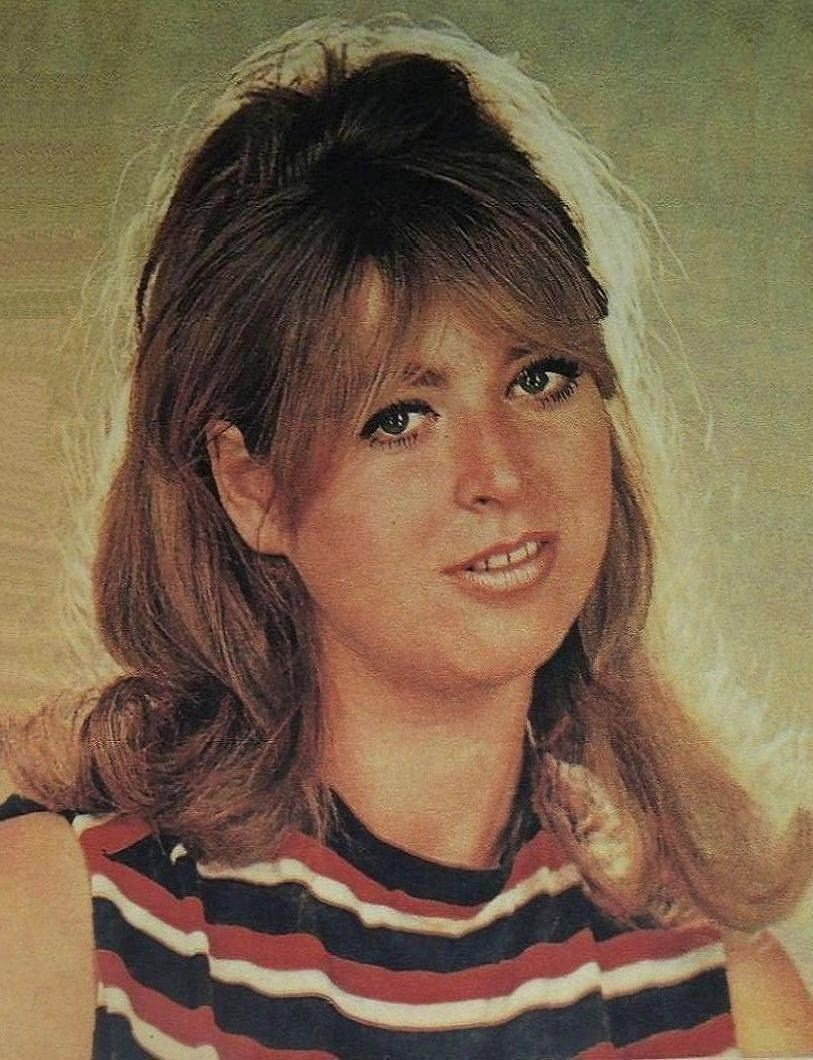
- Lothe in 1970
- Born: 19 April 1942; Wilno, Reichskommissariat Ostland, Germany (now Vilnius, Lithuania)
- Died: 1 April 2022 (aged 79); Poland
- Occupation: Actress
- Years active: 1965–2022
- Spouse(s): Helmut Kajzar (1972–1982; his death); Piotr Lachmann (1984–2022; her death)
- Children: 1
- Parent(s): Tadeusz Lothe and Wanda Stanisławska-Lothe

Jolanta Lothe (19 April 1942 – 1 April 2022) was a Polish actress. She appeared in more than twenty-five films since 1965.

== Biography ==
Jolanta, the daughter of Tadeusz Lothe (1903–1943) and actress Wanda Stanisławska-Lothe (1908–1985), graduated from the National Higher School of Theatre in Warsaw in 1966. After she worked as an actress of Warsaw stages: Syrena Theater (1966–1967), Classic Theater (1968–1972), Studio Theater (1972–1976), and National Theatre (1976–1982). From 1989, together with her second husband Piotr Lachmann, she ran an experimental "Videoteatr Poza" in Warsaw. Her first husband was playwright and theater director Helmut Kajzar, who died in 1982.

== Selected filmography ==
Film
Year	Title	Role	Notes
1965	Walkover	Girl in the Window	
1969	Hunting Flies	Basia	
1970	The Cruise	Young Girl	
1974	A Jungle Book of Regulations	Korbaczewska	
1974	The Deluge	Terka Gasztowtówna-Paculanka	
1976	Brunet wieczorową porą	Cinema Cashier	
