= Jacek Fedorowicz =

Polish satirist and actor

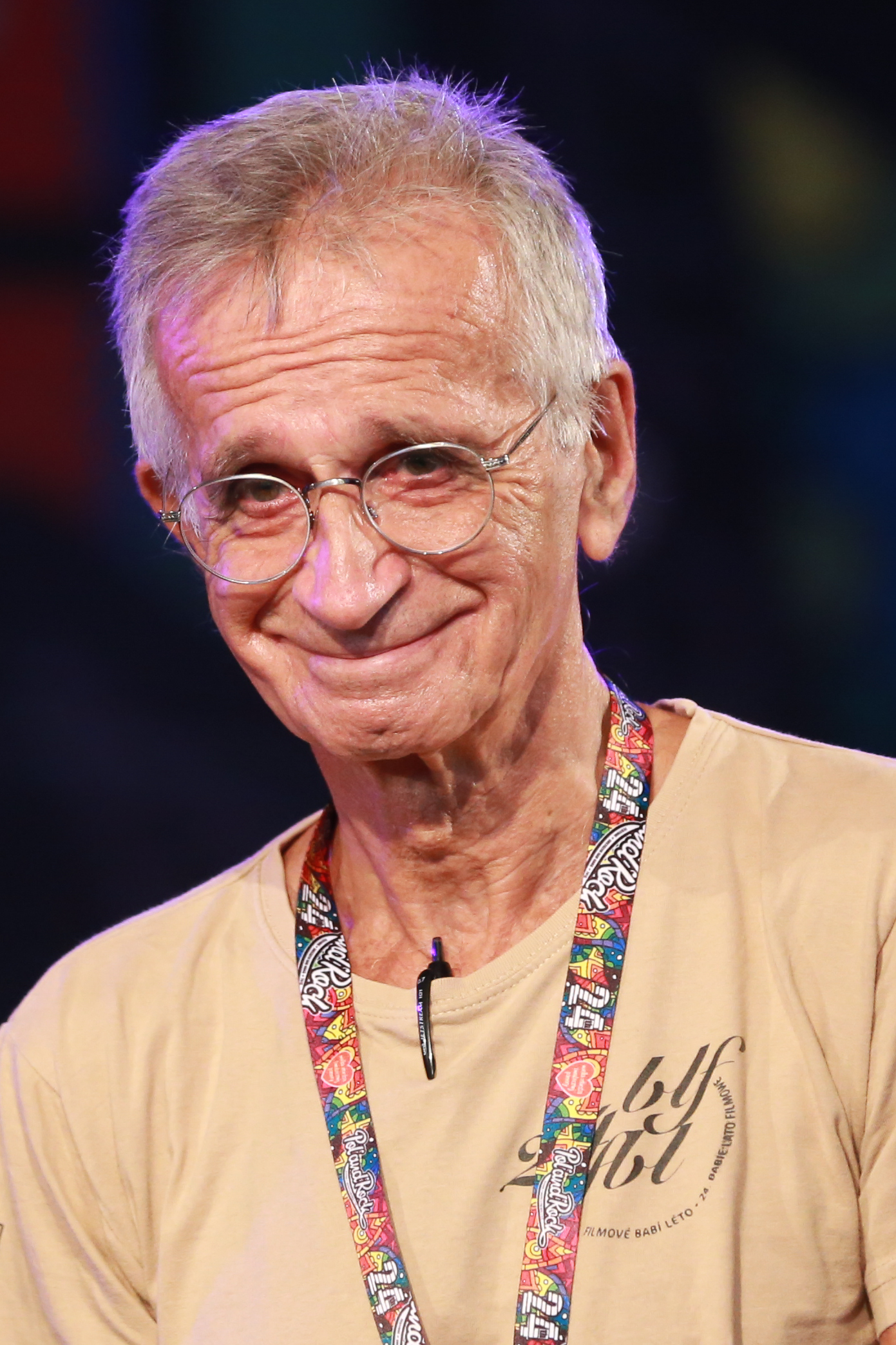
- Jacek Fedorowicz (2018)
- Born: 18 July 1937 (age 88); Gdynia, Poland
- Occupations: Actor and satirist

Jacek Jan Fedorowicz (born 18 July 1937) is a Polish satirist, caricaturist, underground comix artist and actor.

== Early life ==
Fedorowicz was born in pre-war Gdynia, Poland to a family of Varsovians. His parents worked for the newly developed Polish maritime economy. As a 7-year-old boy he survived the Warsaw Uprising. In 1960 graduated from the School of Fine Arts (now the Academy of Fine Arts) in Gdańsk.

== Career ==
Fedorowicz was one of the founders (together with, among others, Zbigniew Cybulski and Bogumił Kobiela) of the student theatre in Gdańsk named Bim-Bom (between 1954 and 1960). He also belonged to the acting company of the theatre (the main role of Dobry Duch in the first programme named Achaaa). During his studies he began his collaboration with a radio station in Gdańsk as an author and actor and also with the press all over the country (among others with Dookoła świata, Po prostu, Dziennik Bałtycki, Szpilki and ITD) as an author and caricaturist.

In the second half of the 1960s he performed on the public Polish Television (TVP), where he was a co-author of various TV shows, such as: Poznajmy się, Małżeństwo doskonałe, Kariera i Runda. In the 70s he co-created a radio satirical magazine 60 minut na godzinę, where he performed several roles creating famous characters, among which were: Kolega Kierownik and Kolega Kuchmistrz. He also held morning conversations on the radio. Together with Piotr Skrzynecki he hosted the National Festival of Polish Song in Opole. Throughout 60's and 70's he performed on stage, first in Kabaret Wagabunda (with Lidia Wysocka, Maria Koterbska, Mieczysław Czechowicz and Bogumił Kobiela, among others), afterwards in a programme Popierajmy się (with Bohdan Łazuka, Tadeusz Ross, Piotr Szczepanik and Ryszard Markowski). Later on, until the beginning of martial law in Poland, he performed on individual author's evenings.

When martial law was introduced in Poland, he decided to break all the contacts with national mass media. He performed mainly in so called "church areas" where he presented his caricatures and pro-Solidarity drawings. Moreover, he gave lectures during Tygodnie Kultury Chrześcijańskiej (Christian Cultural Weeks). At that time both audio and video programmes were released on cassettes in the system of "second circulation" (they were also broadcast in Radio Free Europe). His idea in those times was to ridicule the regime TV news and he continued that after 1995. He was a host of the controversial programme Dziennik Telewizyjny (parodying the Communist-era news programme of the same name) on TVP. His programme went through a metamorphosis from the one about politics into a TV show. In 2005 Dziennik Telewizyjny changed its name into Subiektywny Ekspres Jacka Fedorowicza aka SEJF (Jacek Fedorowicz's Subjective Express) for several months. The satirist ended his collaboration with TVP in 2006.

Since 1989 he has hosted author's evenings in different cities. For some time in 2006 he compered Z przymrużeniem kamery - the series of programmes broadcast by Kino Polska TV which focuses on presenting Polish classic comedy movies. Starting from 1999 he has been writing satirical articles that were published first in Gazeta Telewizyjna (weekly supplement to Gazeta Wyborcza) and now, from April 2008, they are published in Wednesday cultural supplement to Gazeta Wyborcza.

== Personal life ==
He is married and has one daughter, three grandchildren and one great-grandson. Together with his wife Anna he was engaged in Prymasowski Komitet Pomocy Osobom Pozbawionym Wolności i ich Rodzinom (Primate's committee for bringing help to people deprived of their freedom and to their families) that was active during the martial law.

He participates as an amateur in long-distance races.

== Awards ==
Fedorowicz was a laureate of Nagroda Kisiela in 1994 in the category of publicism. Other awards and prizes include:

- 1968 – Złoty Ekran (along with Jerzy Gruza)
- 1968 – Nagroda Komitetu ds. Radia i Telewizji (along with Jerzy Gruza)
- 1975 – Złoty Mikrofon for radio entertainment programmes.
- 1976 – Nagroda Komitetu ds. Radia i Telewizji for the team preparing the programme 60 minut na godzinę.
- 1987 – Nagroda „Solidarności” for satirical programmes distributed on video cassettes in second circulation
- 1996 – Wiktor '95
- 2000 – Grand Prix at the first Festival of Good Humour in Gdańsk and a prize for the best satirical program (Dziennik Telewizyjny).
- 2001 – Wiktor 2000 in the category "television personality of the year".
- 2002 – Gwiazda Telewizji Polskiej - a statuette given on the occasion of 50 years of the public Polish Television for "original and entertaining TV shows"
- 2002, 2003, 2004 –three prizes on the third, fourth and fifth Festival of Good Humour in Gdańsk for TV shows (Dziennik Telewizyjny and its special editions with the audience)
- 2005 – Superwiktor
- 2005 – „Gwiazda Uśmiechu” – a prize received from the audience on the sixth Festival of Good Humour in Gdańsk
- 2006 – A prize for lifetime career artistic achievements received on the seventh Festival of Good Humour in Gdańsk.

== Selected filmography ==
- Do widzenia, do jutra (1960)
- Małżeństwo z rozsądku (1966)
- Lekarstwo na miłość (1966)
- Kochajmy Syrenki (1967), the script and one of the main roles
- Polowanie na muchy (1969)
- Motodrama (1971) the main role
- Poszukiwany, poszukiwana (1972), the script (written in collaboration with Stanisław Bareja) and dialogues
- Nie ma róży bez ognia (1974), the script (written in collaboration with Stanislaw Bareja) and the main role

== Books ==
- Porady estradowca dla kolegów dramatycznych (1974)
- W zasadzie tak
- W zasadzie ciąg dalszy
- 60 minut na godzinę (co-author)
- Felietony i dialogi (published beyond censorship in the country and by the publishing house Kontakt in Paris)
- Dziełka wybrane (1988, published beyond censorship in Chicago)
- Wielka encyklopedia kapitalizmu (1997, the publishing house Centrum im. Adama Smitha)
- PasTVisko (for 70th birthday, the publishing house Wydawnictwo Literackie Kraków)
