= Kwiecień (film) =

1960 Polish war drama film

- Directed by: Witold Lesiewicz
- Written by: Józef Hen
- Screenplay by: Józef Hen
- Based on: Kwiecień by Józef Hen
- Starring: Henryk Bąk
- Cinematography: Czeslaw Swirta
- Edited by: Jadwiga Zajicek
- Music by: Tadeusz Baird
- Release date: 8 November 1960
- Running time: 92 minutes
- Country: Poland
- Language: Polish

Kwiecień is a 1960 Polish war drama film directed by Witold Lesiewicz.

== Synopsis ==
The film takes place in the first months of 1945. A unit of the Polish army prepares to cross the Lusatian Neisse river. The commander of the unit hits a subordinate during an argument. The latter files a report about the incident to the division prosecutor.

== Cast ==
- Henryk Bąk as Colonel Czapran
- Maria Ciesielska as Corporal Ruszkowska
- Leszek Herdegen as Ensign Szumibor
- Jan Kobuszewski as Pawel
- Tadeusz Kondrat as Klukwa
- August Kowalczyk as Division prosecutor
- Krzysztof Kowalewski as Sulikowski
- Jerzy Nowak as Mail carrier
- Piotr Pawłowski as Prosecutor Hyrny
- Franciszek Pieczka as Private Anklewicz
- Bolesław Płotnicki as Kozlowski
- Witold Pyrkosz as Lieutenant Galicki
- Jerzy Turek as Jasiek
- Stanislaw Tym as soldier
