= I Hate Mondays (film) =

1971 film by Tadeusz Chmielewski

- Polish: Nie lubię poniedziałku
- Directed by: Tadeusz Chmielewski
- Written by: Tadeusz Chmielewski
- Starring: Kazimierz Witkiewicz
- Cinematography: Mieczyslaw Jahoda
- Edited by: Maria Orłowska
- Music by: Jerzy Matuszkiewicz
- Production company: Zespół Filmowy „Plan”
- Release date: 27 August 1971
- Running time: 100 min
- Country: Polish PR
- Languages: Polish; Italian

I Hate Mondays (Polish: Nie lubię poniedziałku) is a 1971 Polish comedy film directed by Tadeusz Chmielewski.

== Plot ==
The action of the film takes place on an unlucky Monday in Warsaw and focuses on episodes from the lives of a dozen or so characters. Italian industrialist Francesco Rovanelli (Kazimierz Witkiewicz), who comes to Warsaw with the intention of signing a lucrative contract, unexpectedly gets lost in a foreign city. A Milicja officer (Andrzej Herder) in charge of the movement has to take care of his little son, who, like other children, has not been admitted to the kindergarten because of the rubella that prevails there, and his wife (Joanna Kasperska), who works in a matrimonial office, cannot leave her job. The delegate of the commune cooperative (Jerzy Turek) is looking for a spare part for a combine harvester and argues with the impetuous taxi driver (Adam Mularczyk), and the drunk actor Bohdan Łazuka (appearing as himself) tries to get home, walking through the awakening Warsaw led by tram tracks, in which he stuck the crank to the car.

== Cast ==
- Kazimierz Witkiewicz – Francesco Rovanelli
- Jerzy Turek – Zygmunt Bączyk
- Zygmunt Apostoł – Artist
- Kazimierz Rudzki – Director
- Adam Mularczyk – Taxi Driver
- Bogusz Bilewski – Driver
- Andrzej Gawroński – Wladek
- Mieczysław Czechowicz – Thief
- Andrzej Herder – Cop
- Halina Kowalska – Marianna

== Reception ==
I Hate Mondays was a box-office success.
