= The Tribulations of Balthazar Kober =

- Directed by: Wojciech Jerzy Has
- Screenplay by: Wojciech Jerzy Has
- Based on: The Tribulations of Balthazar Kober by Frédérick Tristan
- Starring: Rafal Wieczynski; Michael Lonsdale; Adrianna Biedrzyńska; Gabriela Kownacka; Emmanuelle Riva
- Cinematography: Grzegorz Kedzierski
- Edited by: Wanda Zeman
- Music by: Zdzislaw Szostak
- Distributed by: PP Film Polski
- Release date: 26 December 1988
- Running time: 115 minutes
- Country: Poland
- Language: Polish

The Tribulations of Balthazar Kober (Polish: Niezwykła podróż Baltazara Kobera) is a 1988 Polish film directed by Wojciech Jerzy Has, starring Rafal Wieczynski, Michael Lonsdale, Adrianna Biedrzyńska, Gabriela Kownacka, Emmanuelle Riva. The film is an adaptation of a novel by Frédérick Tristan that follows a young man as he travels across plague-stricken Germany of the 16th Century.

== Plot ==
Young alchemy student Balthazar (Rafal Wieczynski) and his master (Michael Lonsdale) are forced to flee their home by the inquisition. They set off on a journey across a plague-stricken Germany, encountering various people including corrupt priests and Kabbalists, not to mention ghosts and even an angel, before ending up in Venice where Balthazar falls in love with a young actress.

The film is Has's final film, and marks a return to the picaresque, extravagant style of The Saragossa Manuscript and The Hourglass Sanatorium, with which it can be seen as a part of a trilogy.

== Cast ==
- Rafal Wieczynski as Balthasar Kober
- Michael Lonsdale as Le maître
- Adrianna Biedrzyńska as Rosa
- Gabriela Kownacka as Gertrude / Gertruda
- Emmanuelle Riva as La mère
- Daniel Emilfork as Le recteur
- Jerzy Bończak as Flamand - Varlet
- Zofia Merle as La matronne
- Evelyne Dassas as L'aubergiste
- Christine Laurent as Marguerite
- Andrzej Szczepkowski as Le cardinal / Kardinal Nenni
- Frédéric Leidgens as Battista Strozzi

== Release ==
Released on December 26, 1988, the film was entered into the 1988 Polish Film Festival, where Janusz Rosól won the award for Best Sound. It was also nominated for the Golden Lion at the Venice Film Festival the same year, but did not win.

== See also ==
- Cinema of Poland
- List of Polish-language films
