= Miś z okienka =

Polish children's TV series

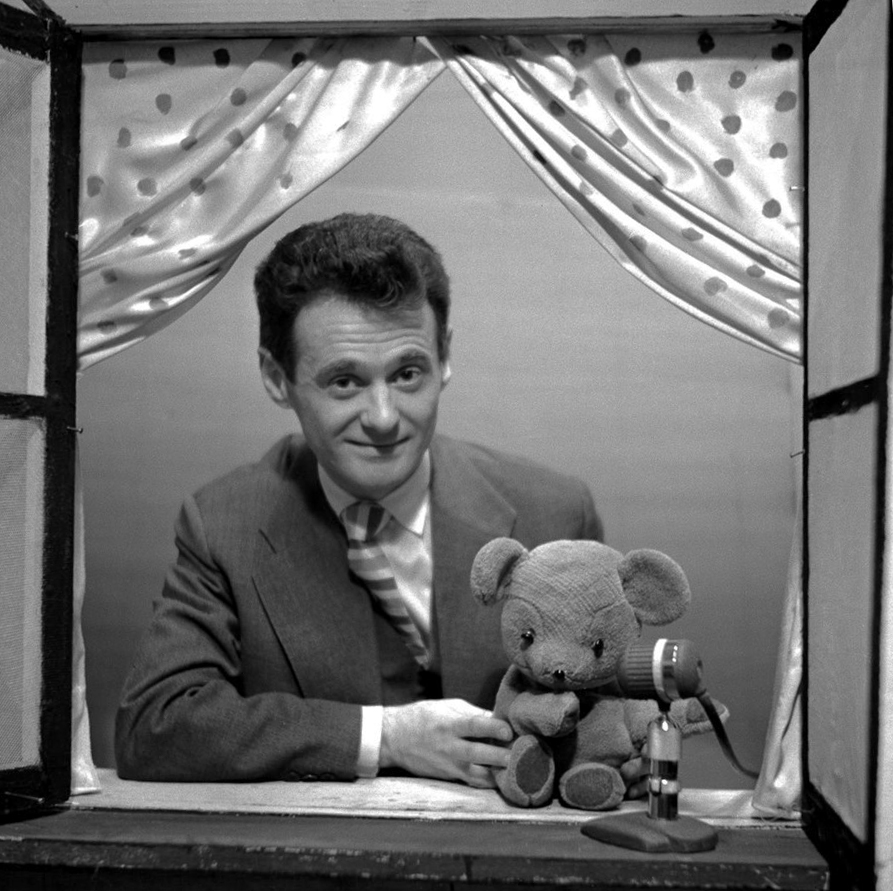
- Bronisław Pawlik starring in the program
- Genre: Educational
- Based on: Whirligig
- Written by: Wanda Szerewicz
- Screenplay by: Bronisław Pawlik; Stanisław Wyszyński
- Country of origin: Polish People's Republic
- Original language: Polish

Original release
- Release: 1957 – 1973

Miś z okienka (Polish pronunciation: [miɕ ˈsɔkʲɛnka]; lit. The Bear from the Window) was a Polish educational children's television series or wieczorynka emitted in Telewizja Polska from 1957 to 1973. It was based on the BBC series Whirligig, led by Humphrey Lestocq. The show consisted of the bear (miś) and the presenter talking about topics from books that they read together. The presenters were Bronisław Pawlik and Stanisław Wyszyński, which were onscreen in said order.
