= Kapitan Sowa na tropie =

1965 Polish film

- Directed by: Stanisław Bareja
- Written by: Alojzy Kaczanowski; Janina Ipohorska
- Starring: Wiesław Gołas
- Cinematography: Franciszek Kądziołka
- Music by: Jerzy Matuszkiewicz
- Release date: December 25, 1965
- Running time: 215 minutes
- Language: Polish

Kapitan Sowa na tropie is a Polish series from 1965 directed by Stanisław Bareja. It was the first Polish criminal series made after World War II.
