= Stanisław Gawlik =

Polish actor

- Born: 9 November 1925; Stopna, Poland
- Died: 2 February 1990
- Years active: 1953–1990

Stanisław Gawlik (November 11, 1925 – February 2, 1990) was a Polish actor. He made over 20 appearances in film and television. He starred in the 1978 comedy film What Will You Do When You Catch Me?.
