= Wiesław Gołas =

Polish actor (1930–2021)

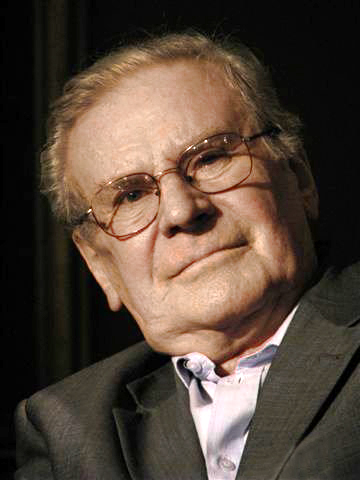
- Gołas in 2008
- Born: 9 October 1930; Kielce, Poland
- Died: 9 September 2021 (aged 90); Warsaw, Poland
- Occupation: Actor
- Notable work: Kaleń in Ogniomistrz Kaleń , Stefan Waldek in Dzięcioł
- Spouse: Maria Krawczyk-Gołas

Wiesław Ryszard Gołas (Polish: ['vʲε.swav 'gɔ.was]; 9 October 1930 – 9 September 2021) was a Polish actor and Armia Krajowa soldier. He was cast in the role of Tomasz Czereśniak in Czterej pancerni i pies (Polish: Four tank men and a dog), a widely popular TV series set during World War II. He appeared in a number of films, including Ogniomistrz Kaleń (1961) and Dzięcioł (1970).

== Filmography ==
Sources:

- 1954 – A Generation as German gendarme
- 1956 – Szkice węglem as Wawrzon Rzepa
- 1956 – Shadow as Underground Soldier
- 1958 – Dezerter
- 1958 – Miasteczko
- 1958 – Rancho Texas
- 1959 – Lotna as Soldier
- 1959 – Tysiąc talarów
- 1960 – Bad Luck as UB Officer
- 1960 – Przygoda w terenie
- 1960 – Hamleś
- 1960 – Szklana góra
- 1960 – Ostrożnie, Yeti!
- 1961 – Dotknięcie nocy
- 1961 – Husband of His Wife as Józek Ciapuła
- 1961 – The Artillery Sergeant Kalen as Artillery Sergeant Hipolit Kaleń
- 1961 – Alice in Wonderland as March Hare (voice, Polish dub)
- 1962 – How to Be Loved as
- 1962 – Dom bez okien
- 1963 – Przygoda noworoczna
- 1963 – Naprawdę wczoraj
- 1963 – Zacne grzechy as Zbigniew Trzaska
- 1963 – Żona dla Australijczyka
- 1964 – Prawo i pięść as Antoni Smólka
- 1964 – Beata
- 1964 – Upał
- 1964 – The Saragossa Manuscript as Guitarist in Tavern
- 1965 – Kapitan Sowa na tropie as Captain MO Tomasz Sowa
- 1965 – Markiza de Pompadour
- 1965 – Wózek
- 1965 – Three Steps on Earth as Szkudlarek (segment "Dzień urodzin")
- 1966–70 – Four Tank-Men and a Dog as Private/Corporal Tomasz Czereśniak
- 1966 – Chudy i inni
- 1967 – Cześć kapitanie
- 1967 – Kwestia sumienia
- 1967 – Przeraźliwe łoże
- 1968 – Lalka
- 1968 – Gra
- 1969 – Piąta rano
- 1969 – Nowy
- 1970 – Dzięcioł as Stefan Walder
- 1970 – Hydrozagadka as Taxi Driver
- 1970 – Mały
- 1970 – Dziura w ziemi
- 1971 – Kłopotliwy gość
- 1971 – Kareta
- 1971 – Niebieskie jak Morze Czarne
- 1972 – Man – Woman Wanted as Karpiel
- 1973 – Droga
- 1974 – Being Forty as Platoon-leader SP Ziemia (Episode 1.)
- 1974 – The Deluge as Stefan Czarniecki
- 1974 – A Jungle Book of Regulations as Malinowski
- 1975 – Kazimierz Wielki as Maćko Borkowic
- 1975 – Dyrektorzy as Adam's Brother (Episode 2.)
- 1976 – Brunet wieczorową porą as Kazik Malinowski
- 1976 – Zaklęty dwór
- 1977 – Wszyscy i nikt
- 1978 – Jarosławna, korolewa Francji (Yaroslavna, koroleva Frantsii)
- 1978 – Hallo Szpicbródka czyli ostatni występ króla kasiarzy
- 1979 – Klincz
- 1979 – Ród Gąsieniców
- 1980 – Dzień Wisły
- 1980 – Alicja as Gangster
- 1980 – Polonia Restituta as Józef Dowbor-Muśnicki
- 1981 – Filip z konopi
- 1981 – Miłość ci wszystko wybaczy
- 1981 – Gdzie szukać szczęścia?
- 1982 – Niech cię odleci mara
- 1982 – Przygrywka
- 1982 – Noc poślubna w biały dzień
- 1982 – Latawiec
- 1982 – Oko proroka as Cossack Midopak
- 1983 – Kasztelanka
- 1983 – Alternatywy 4 as Mr. Majewski
- 1983 – Tajemnica starego ogrodu
- 1984 – Zabicie ciotki
- 1984 – Przeklęte oko proroka as Cossack Midopak
- 1985 – Oko proroka czyli Hanusz Bystry i jego przygody
- 1985 – Dłużnicy śmierci
- 1989 – Rififi po sześćdziesiątce
- 1996 – Szabla od komendanta
