= Andrzej Fedorowicz (actor) =

Polish actor (born 1942)

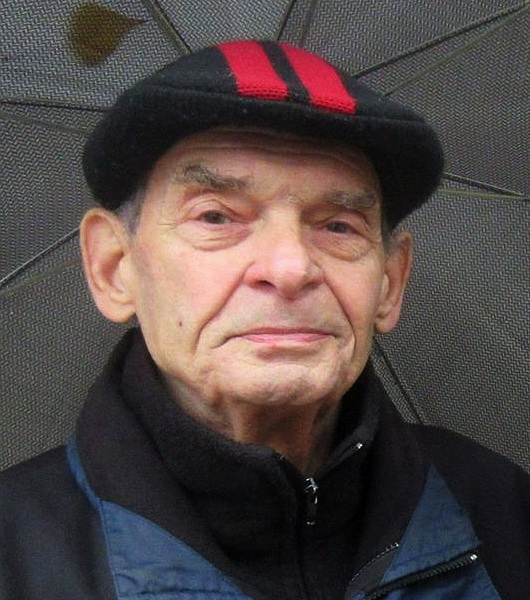
- Andrzej Fedorowicz in 2018
- Born: 21 January 1942; Kraków, Poland
- Occupation: actor
- Years active: 1964–

Andrzej Fedorowicz (born 21 January 1942) is a Polish actor. He has made over 10 appearances in film. He starred in the 1978 comedy film What Will You Do When You Catch Me?.
