= Wojciech Pokora =

Polish actor

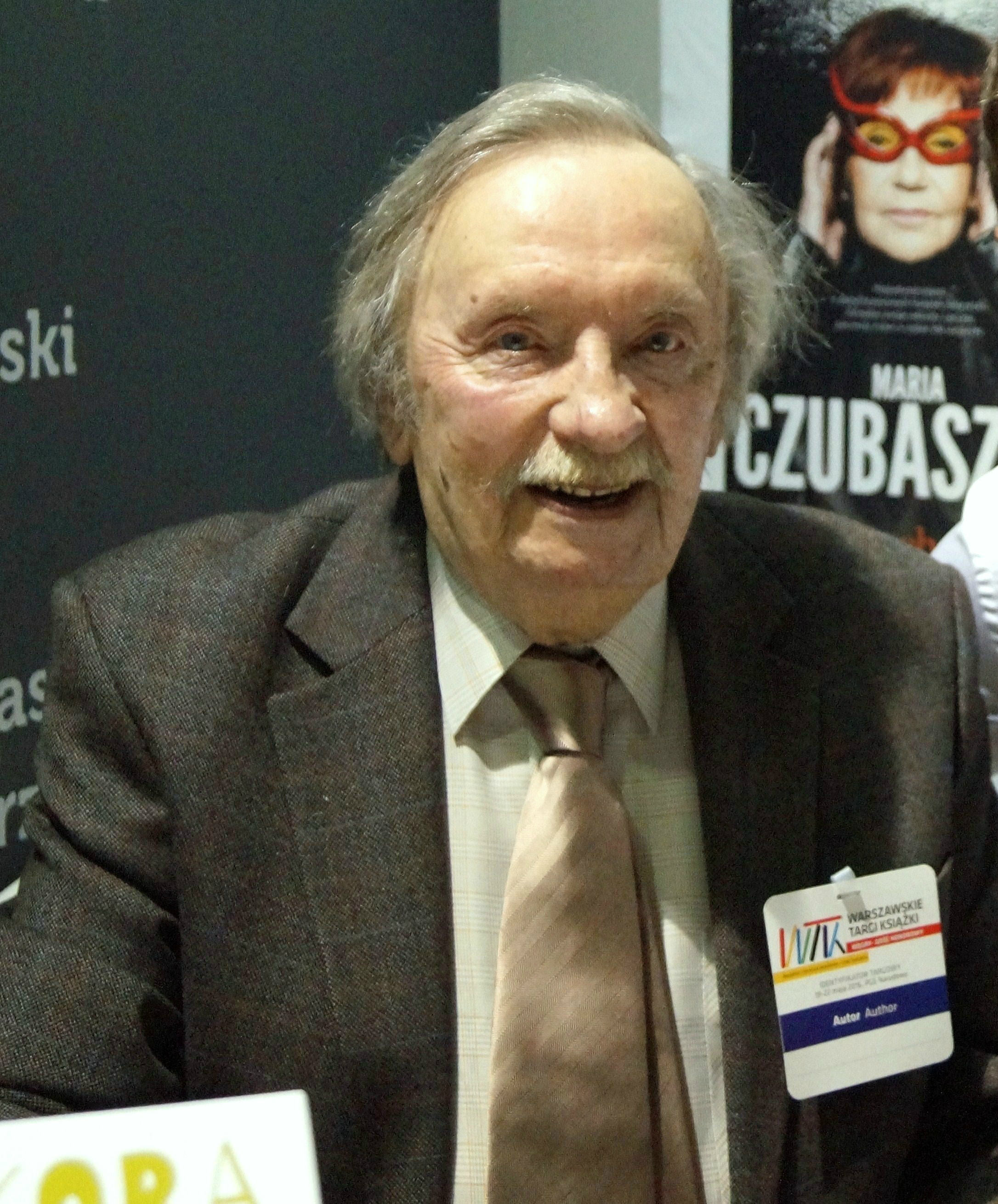
- Born: 2 October 1934; Warsaw, Poland
- Died: 4 February 2018 (aged 83); Warsaw, Poland
- Years active: 1960–2018
- Spouse: Hanna Pokora

Wojciech Wacław Pokora (2 October 1934 – 4 February 2018) was a Polish actor. He has made over 40 appearances in film and television. He starred in the 1986–1987 television series Zmiennicy.

== Selected filmography ==
- Bad Luck (1960)
- Husband of His Wife (1961)
- Nieznany (1964)
- Marriage of Convenience (1967)
- The Cruise (1970)
- Hydrozagadka (1971)
- Man – Woman Wanted (1973)
- A Jungle Book of Regulations (1974)
- Brunet wieczorową porą (1976)
- What Will You Do When You Catch Me? (1978)
- Teddy Bear (1980)
- Czterdziestolatek
