= Mieczysław Hryniewicz =

Polish actor (born 1949)

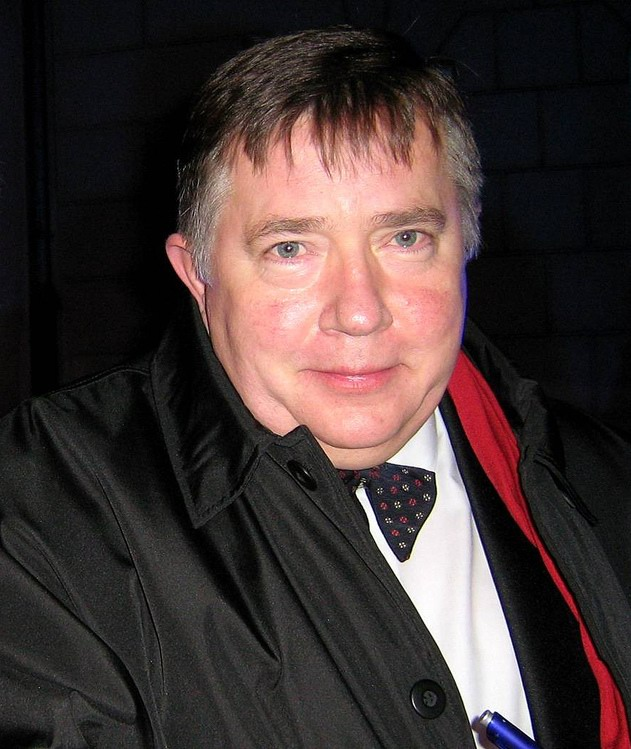
- Born: 31 August 1949; Wąsosz, Poland
- Years active: 1974 -

Mieczysław Hryniewicz (born 31 August 1949) is a Polish actor. He has made around 40 appearances in film and television. He starred in the 1986-1987 television series Zmiennicy.
