= Calls Controlled =

1991 Polish comedy film

- Polish: Rozmowy kontrolowane
- Directed by: Sylwester Chęciński
- Written by: Stanisław Tym
- Starring: Stanisław Tym; Krzysztof Kowalewski; Irena Kwiatkowska; Alina Janowska
- Cinematography: Jerzy Stawicki
- Edited by: Krzysztof Osiecki
- Music by: Jerzy Matuszkiewicz
- Production company: Zespól Filmowy "Zodiak"
- Distributed by: Helios
- Release date: 13 December 1991 (Poland)
- Running time: 93 minutes
- Country: Poland
- Language: Polish

Calls Controlled (Polish: Rozmowy kontrolowane) is a Polish black comedy film directed by Sylwester Chęciński and released in 1991. It is a sequel to the 1980 film Teddy Bear and was followed in 2007 by Ryś.

== Synopsis ==
In December 1981, Ryszard Ochódzki (nicknamed "Miś"—teddy bear), a communist sympathizer and president of the sports club "Tęcza", is tasked with infiltrating the Solidarity trade union by his acquaintance, Colonel Zygmunt Molibden, with whom he has various clandestine interests, and whose wife he is sleeping with.

Equipped with a Solidarity ID card and a photo taken with Lech Wałęsa, Ochódzki goes to Suwałki, where he falls under martial law. Through a series of unlikely incidents, he finds himself on the run from the secret police (SB).

Meanwhile, General Zambik, Molibden's superior, informs him that he is aware of his dealings with Ochódzki. Out of concern for his own career and safety, Molibden decides to have Miś killed. SB lieutenant Jan Nogałka unsuccessfully tries to strangle the fugitive and ends up trapped in a poacher's snare in the forest. Ochódzki seeks refuge with his aunt Lusia in Rembertów, where Molibden finds him and offers to help him escape to Sweden, disguised as a woman. He doesn't keep his word, however, and the plot fails.

On New Year's Eve, Ochódzki hides in a toilet of the Palace of Culture and Science, where all high-ranking dignitaries, including Zambik and Molibden, are celebrating. When he flushes, the entire edifice collapses, leaving Ochódzki as the only one to escape the rubble.

== Cast ==
- Stanisław Tym as Ryszard Ochódzki
- Krzysztof Kowalewski as Colonel Zygmunt Molibden
- Irena Kwiatkowska as Aunt Lusia
- Alina Janowska as Halina Nalezyty
- Jerzy Turek as coach Wacław Jarząbek
- Bożena Dykiel as Kokoszka
- Marian Opania as General Zambik
- Jerzy Bończak as Morwa

== See also ==
- Cinema of Poland
- List of Polish language films
