= Janina Ipohorska =

Polish painter and writer

Janina Ipohorska (August 15, 1914 – September 19, 1981) was a Polish painter and writer. She wrote under the pseudonyms Jan Kamyczek, Alojzy Kaczanowski and Bracia Rojek.

She was born in Lviv and was educated at the University of Lviv. She also studied painting with Felicjan Kowarski at the Academy of Fine Arts in Warsaw. She later lectured on costume design at the Academy for three years.

Ipohorska co-founded of the Przekrój weekly magazine and wrote the advice column "Demokratyczny savoir-vivre". She published a book based on her column Grzeczność na co dzień ("Everyday politeness") in 1956.

She also designed sets and costumes for the theatre and translated French literature into Polish.

She was screenwriter for Kapitan Sowa na tropie, the first Polish crime fiction television series.

Ipohorska died in Rabka at the age of 67.
