= Man – Woman Wanted =

1973 Polish film

Man - Woman Wanted
- Directed by: Stanisław Bareja
- Written by: Stanisław Bareja; Jacek Fedorowicz
- Starring: Wojciech Pokora; Jolanta Bohdal; Maria Chwalibóg; Wiesław Gołas; Mieczysław Czechowicz
- Cinematography: Jan Laskowski
- Music by: Jerzy Matuszkiewicz
- Release date: 22 April 1973
- Running time: 83 minutes
- Language: Polish

Man – Woman Wanted is the English title of the Polish film Poszukiwany, poszukiwana, a comedy released in 1973, directed by Stanisław Bareja. The film follows a museum employee who has been accused of art theft. He goes into hiding, in the disguise of a cleaning lady, and attempts to recreate the stolen art so he can come out of hiding.
