= Kazimierz Kaczor =

Polish actor and television presenter

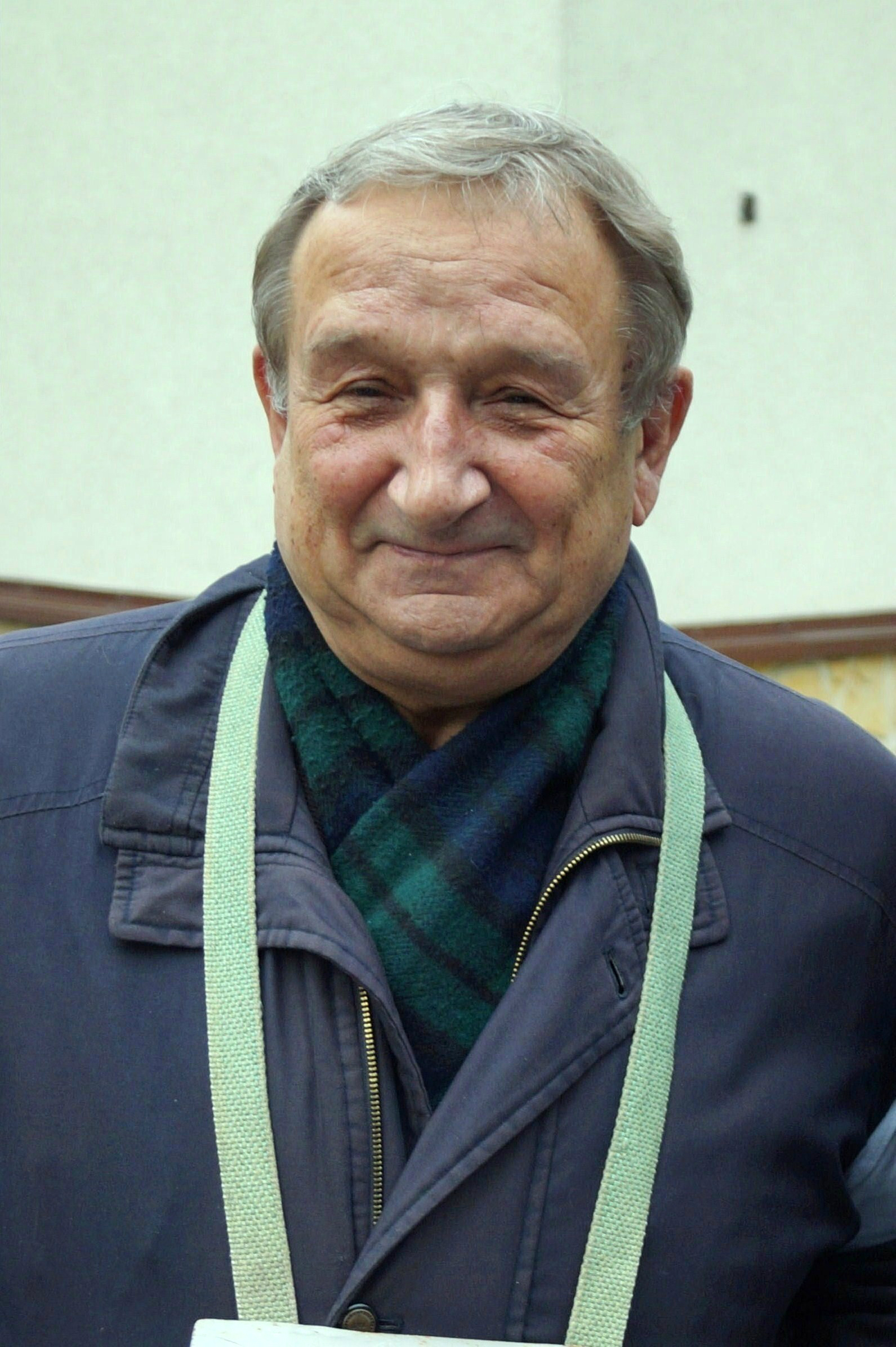
- Kazimierz Kaczor, 2016
- Born: 9 February 1941 (age 84); Kraków, Poland
- Years active: 1968 -

Kazimierz Julian Kaczor (born February 9, 1941) is a Polish actor and television presenter. He has made over 40 appearances in film and television. He starred in the 1986-1987 television series Zmiennicy but is well known for hosting from 1996-2003 the first version of Jeopardy! Poland.

== Selected filmography ==
- Polskie drogi (1976)
- Jan Serce (1985)
- Alternatywy 4 (1986)
