= Jarosław Skulski =

Polish actor (1907–1977)

Jarosław Skulski (March 30, 1907 in Ufa, Russia – July 22, 1977 in Warsaw, Poland) was a Russian-born Polish film and theatre actor, who has also acted in Poland's Theatre Television and radio plays from Polskie Radio.

== Biography ==
Born in the Russian Empire, Skulski came to Poland at age 13 in 1920 with his family. After matriculation and completing military service, he began his studies at the Faculty of Architecture at Warsaw University of Technology, which was interrupted in 1933. He then joined the National Institute of Theatre Arts, specifically the Faculty of Acting, where he graduated.

Before 1939 he performed in Warsaw and Kalisz, and took part in set design. In 1938 he made his debut in film. During World War II, he was employed to trade firewood.

In 1944 he became an actor in the Russian theater Tanagara, where he played in a variety show.

Before the outbreak of the Werwolf, he left Warsaw and escaped through the front lands liberated by the Red Army. Initially he organized in the Otwock and Lublin theaters Militia and then engaged in Lublin-based Polish Army. The theater moved along with the army, in 1945, he was in Łódź. Skulski performed there until the end of 1946, after which he moved to Warsaw. The following season he played at the Municipal Dramatic Theatre, and from 1947 until 1949 at the New Theatre.

In the years 1949-1959, he often changed the scene he played in the Dramatic Theatre in Częstochowa, from 1952 to 1956 at the Dramatic Theatre in Szczecin, and from 1956 to 1959 at the Osterwa Theatre in Lublin. In 1959 he returned to Warsaw and then became an actor at the Dramatic Theatre in Warsaw, where he played until his retirement in 1975.
