= What Will You Do When You Catch Me? =

1978 Polish comedy film

- DVD cover for What Will You Do When You Catch Me?
- Directed by: Stanisław Bareja
- Written by: Stanisław Bareja; Stanisław Tym
- Starring: Krzysztof Kowalewski; Bronisław Pawlik; Stanisław Tym
- Music by: Jerzy Derfel
- Release date: 1978
- Language: Polish

What Will You Do When You Catch Me? (Polish: Co mi zrobisz, jak mnie złapiesz?) is a Polish comedy film released in 1978, directed by Stanisław Bareja.

What Will You Do shares many themes with Bareja's other comedies, especially Teddy Bear, with an emphasis on the sheer absurdity of life under Communism. The plot is very convoluted similarly to other Bareja's screwball comedies and includes many interconnected storylines as well as scenes of the day-to-day lives of the hapless citizens of Warsaw.

== Plot ==
The main plot line revolves around Tadeusz Krzakoski (Krzysztof Kowalewski) director of a failing state-owned company. When his mistress, a daughter of a Communist party bigwig, announces that she's pregnant Tadeusz knows that in order to save his reputation and his job he needs to marry her. But as he is already married he tries to engineer a plot to get divorced quickly.

== Cast ==
- Krzysztof Kowalewski - Tadeusz Krzakoski
- Bronisław Pawlik - Roman Ferde
- Stanisław Tym - Tadek Dudala / Szymek
- Ewa Wiśniewska - Anna Krzakoska
- Ewa Ziętek - Danusia
- Andrzej Fedorowicz - Mrugala
- Stefan Friedmann - Worker
- Janusz Gajos – Supermarket Manager
- Zdzisław Maklakiewicz – Father
- Zofia Merle - Krzakoski's Servant
- Stanisław Gawlik - Stefan Kołodziej

== See also ==
- Cinema of Poland
- List of Polish language films
