= Krzysztof Kowalewski =

Polish actor and comedian (1937–2021)

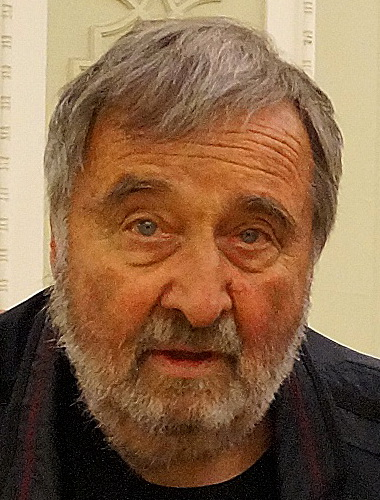
- Kowalewski in 2018
- Born: 20 March 1937; Warsaw, Poland
- Died: 6 February 2021 (aged 83); Warsaw, Poland
- Occupations: Actor; comedian
- Years active: 1960–2020
- Spouse(s): Vivian Rodriguez (divorced); Agnieszka Suchora (2002–2021)

Krzysztof Kowalewski (20 March 1937 – 6 February 2021) was a Polish actor and comedian.

== Biography ==
Kowalewski was born to a Jewish mother, actress Elżbieta Herszaft-Kowalewska and Polish father, Cyprian Kowalewski, who was a soldier.

His first wife, Vivian, was from Cuba. For many years, he was in a relationship with actress Ewa Wiśniewska. They split up after Krzysztof met actress Agnieszka Suchora, whom he married in 2002. He had two children: Wiktor (from his relationship with Vivian) and Gabriela (with Agnieszka Suchora).

Kowalewski was awarded a Grand Splendor Prize (Wielki Splendor) in 1992, the Knight's Cross of the Order of Polonia Restituta in 2002, and a Medal for Merit to Culture – Gloria Artis the same year.

== Selected filmography ==
=== Film ===
List of film appearances, with year, title, and role shown
Year	Title	Role	Notes
1960	Knights of the Teutonic Order	Teutonic archer	Uncredited
1961	Kwiecień	Sulikowski	
1966	Marysia i Napoleon	Officer	Uncredited
1974	The Deluge	Roch Kowalski	
1974	A Jungle Book of Regulations	Militiaman	
1974	Gniazdo	Boleslaw - Son of Boleslaw I Okrutny	
1976	Brunet wieczorową porą	Michał Roman	
1978	What Will You Do When You Catch Me?	Tadeusz Krzakoski	
1980	Teddy Bear	Jan Hochwander	
1986	Jezioro Bodenskie	Pociejak	
1990	Eminent Domain	Owner of shooting range	
1991	Calls Controlled	Zygmunt Molibden	
1995	Nothing Funny	Producer	
1999	With Fire and Sword	Jan Onufry Zagłoba	
2001	In Desert and Wilderness	Kalioupoli	
2002	Career of Nikos Dyzma	Borewicz	

=== Television ===
List of television appearances, with year, title, and role shown
Year	Title	Role	Notes
1975	Czterdziestolatek	Benek	2 episodes
1978	07 zgłoś się	Cameo	1 episode
1986	Zmiennicy	Tomasz Michalik	9 episodes
1989	Janna	Oskar Nowak	15 episodes
2003	Bao-Bab, czyli zielono mi	General Mamoń	3 episodes
2007–08	Niania	Janusz Skalski	2 episodes
2009	39 i pół	Chelko	1 episode
2013	True Law	Lucjan Zawilski	1 episode
