= Brunet wieczorową porą =

1976 Polish comedy film

- DVD cover
- Directed by: Stanisław Bareja
- Written by: Stanisław Bareja; Stanisław Tym
- Starring: Krzysztof Kowalewski; Wojciech Pokora; Janina Traczykówna; Wiesław Gołas; Bohdan Łazuka; Ryszard Pietruski; Bożena Dykiel
- Cinematography: Wiesław Zdort
- Edited by: Krystyna Rutkowska
- Music by: Waldemar Kazanecki
- Production company: Zespol Filmowy "Pryzmat"
- Distributed by: Zjednoczenie Rozpowszechniania Filmów
- Release date: 18 October 1976 (Poland)
- Running time: 89 minutes
- Country: Poland
- Language: Polish

Brunet wieczorową porą (English: Brunet Will Call, literally "Dark-haired man at evening time") is a 1976 Polish comedy film directed by Stanisław Bareja.

== Synopsis ==
A Gypsy woman appears at the house of the protagonist, Michał Roman, and makes a number of strange prophecies, which he initially dismisses. The most serious prediction is that Michał will accidentally kill a brown-haired man at his house the next evening. Together with a friend, Michał tries to prevent the imminent crime. He leaves his house, but misfortune follows him, as all the Gypsy woman's words come true, including the death of Dzidek Krępak, a brown-haired man. Despite various adversities, Michał manages to identify the real murderer.

== Cast ==
- Krzysztof Kowalewski as Michał Roman
- Wojciech Pokora as Kowalski, Michał's neighbour
- Janina Traczykówna as Lucyna Barańczak, Michał's neighbour
- Wiesław Gołas as Kazik Malinowski, Michał's friend
- Bohdan Łazuka as Michał's neighbour
- Ryszard Pietruski as Dzidek Krępak
- Bożena Dykiel as Anna Roman, Michał's wife
