= Irena Kwiatkowska =

Polish actress (1912–2011)

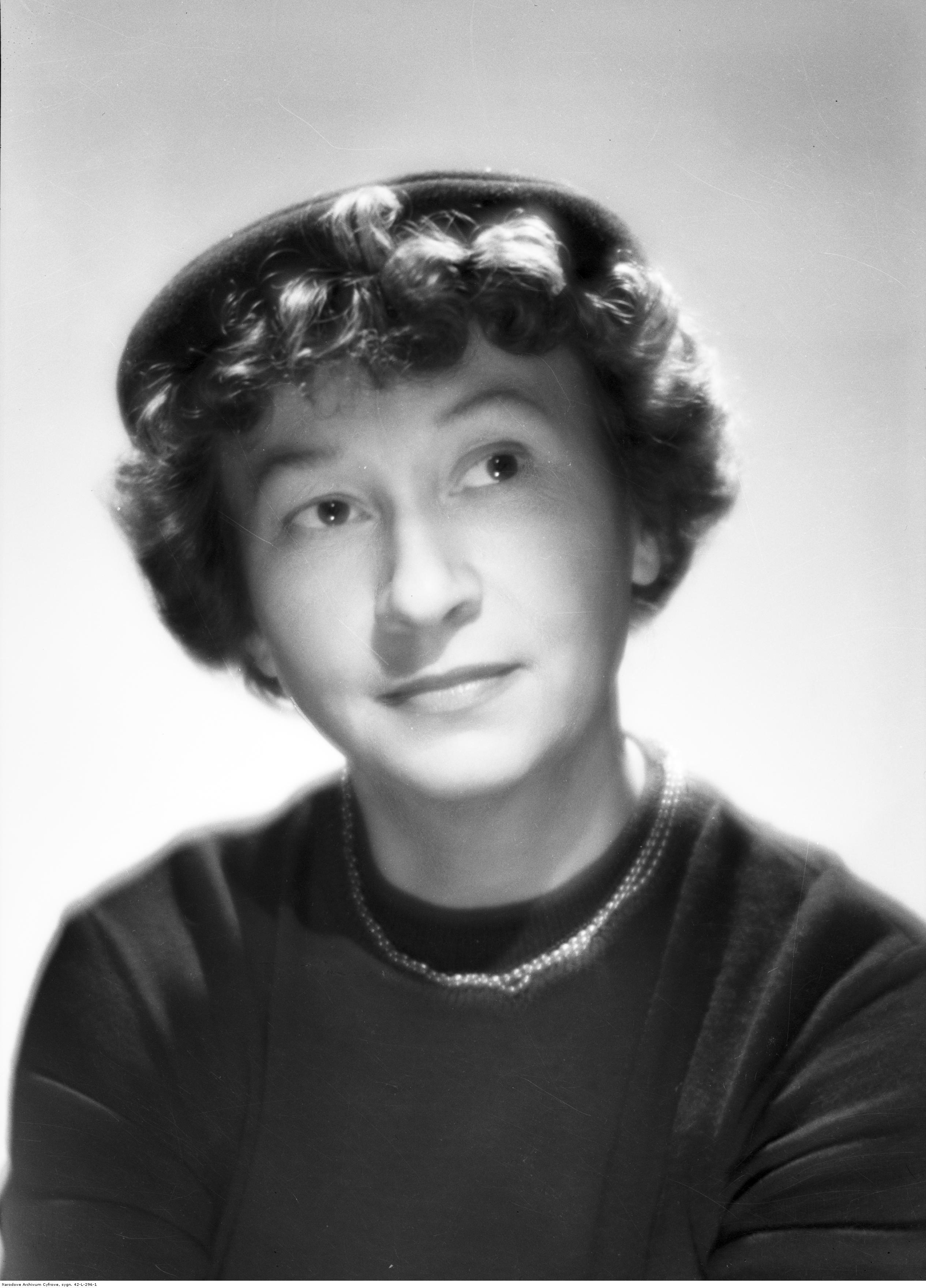
- Born: 17 September 1912; Warsaw, Poland
- Died: 3 March 2011 (aged 98); Konstancin-Jeziorna, Poland
- Occupation: Actress
- Years active: 1935–2009
- Spouse: Bolesław Kielski (1947–1994)

Irena Kwiatkowska (17 September 1912 – 3 March 2011) was a popular Polish actress, known in Poland for her many cabaret roles and monologues, as well as appearances in (mostly comedy) movies and television shows.

== Life ==
Kwiatkowska graduated from the Państwowy Instytut Sztuki Teatralnej (National Theatrical Arts Institute) in 1935. Until the outbreak of World War II, she appeared in the Teatr Powszechny in Warsaw, Teatr Nowy in Poznań, Teatr Polski in Katowice, and in Wilno. During the War, she fought in the Armia Krajowa and participated in the Warsaw Uprising.

Kwiatkowska's first appearance after the War was in the Siedem Kotów (Seven Cats) cabaret in Kraków, where the renowned Polish poet, Konstanty Ildefons Gałczyński, authored a number of roles for her. Gałczyński allegedly created the prominent character of Hermenegilda Kociubińska with Kwiatkowska in mind. In 1948 she came back to Warsaw, appearing in the Teatr Syrena and, now-legendary, Dudek and Szpak cabarets. She was also a prominent member of the cast in the famous televised Kabaret Starszych Panów.

Kwiatkowska's other famous television roles included the cult series, Wojna Domowa ("Civil War", 1965–66) and Czterdziestolatek ("Being Forty", 1974–77). In the Czterdziestolatek series, she portrayed the memorable "Kobieta Pracująca" ("Working Woman"), a recurring character who performs various unusual or absurd jobs. She is best remembered for this role, and the character's name has become synonymous with Kwiatkowska. She reprised the role in the series sequel, Czterdziestolatek 20 lat później (1993). She also appeared in many theatrical movies, mostly in comedies and musicals, including memorable cameos in later years. Her résumé included frequent voice acting on the radio.

During her lifetime Kwiatkowska received numerous awards, including the Wielki Splendor Polish Radio Theatre Award (1993) and the Superwiktor (2002), a special lifetime achievement award for outstanding television personalities. Her 90th birthday celebration in 2002 was a major cultural event which attracted a varied array of artists on stage during a special televised show. She performed with the Teatr Polski in Warsaw, where she continued to appear in an interpretation of Gałczyński's Zielona Gęś. She appeared in Niarnia in 2009.

== Death and recognition ==
She died in Skolimów on 3 March 2011.

She received the Order of the Smile in 1998.

== Filmography ==
Year	Title	Role	Notes
1953	A Matter to Settle	Train Passenger	
1958	Zolnierz królowej Madagaskaru	Aniela Lemiecka	
1960	Tysiac talarów	Eulalia Wydech	
1961	Drugi czlowiek	Gorzycka	
1962	I ty zostaniesz Indianinem	Redactor of 'Kobieta aniol'	
1963	Klub kawalerów	swatka Pelagia Dziurdziulinska	
1963	Zacne grzechy	Firlejowa	
1971	Dzieciol	Nurse	
1976	Motylem jestem, czyli romans czterdziestolatka	Working Woman	
1978	Hallo Szpicbródka, czyli ostatni wystep króla kasiarzy	Buffet Attendant Makowska	
1979	Prosze slonia	Mama	Voice
1984	Lata dwudzieste, lata trzydzieste	Aniela	
1988	Pan Kleks w kosmosie	Crystal ball 'Kula informacyjna'	Uncredited
1991	Calls Controlled	Aunt Lusia	
2000	Når nettene blir lange		Uncredited
2008	Jeszcze nie wieczór	Irena Kwiatkowska	
2020	Kill It and Leave This Town	Old Woman on the Train	Voice, (final film role)

== See also ==
- List of Poles
