= Marian Opania =

Polish actor (born 1943)

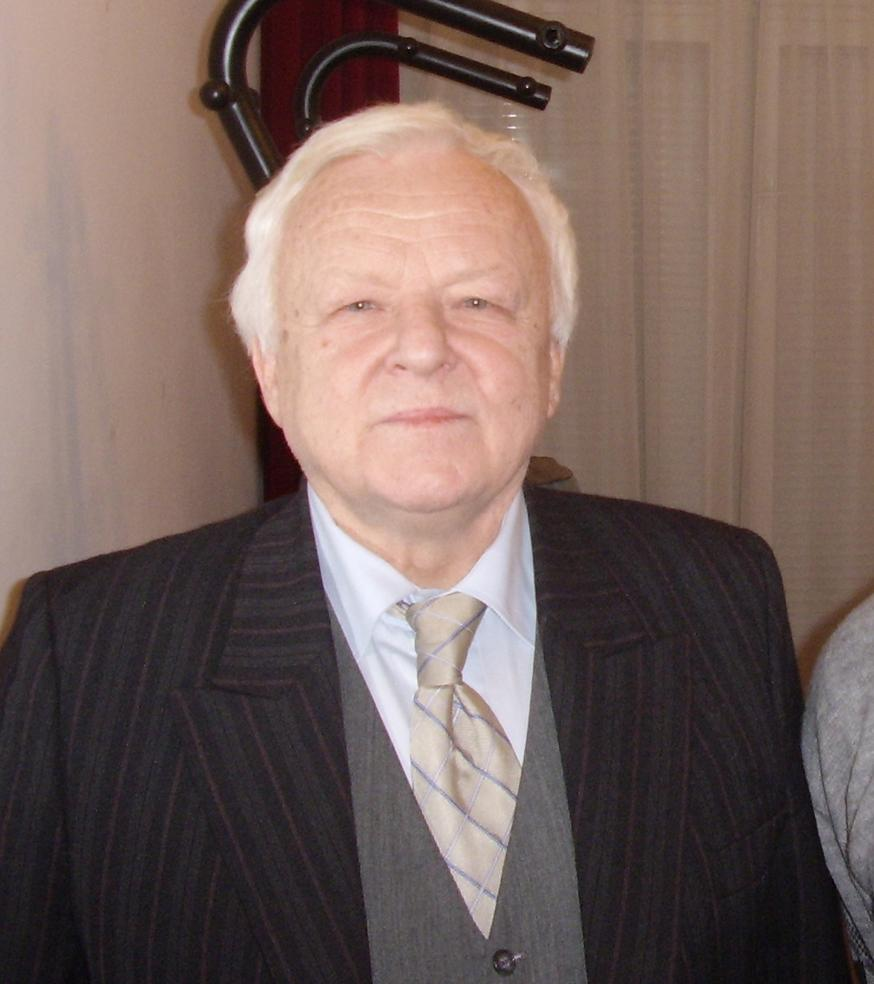
- Born: 1 February 1943 (age 83); Puławy, Poland
- Education: The Aleksander Zelwerowicz National Academy of Dramatic Art in Warsaw
- Occupations: Actor, singer
- Years active: 1965-present
- Musical career
- Genres: Pop
- Label: Agencja Artystyczna MTJ

Marian Opania (Polish pronunciation: [ˈmarjan ɔˈpaɲa]; born 1 February 1943) is a Polish film actor and singer. He has appeared in more than 50 films since 1965.

== Biography ==
He was born on 1 February 1943 in Puławy as the second son of Julian and Jadwiga. His father was a forester and an infantry officer in the Polish Army, he died in the Warsaw Uprising.

In the years 1964–1971 he performed at the Classic Theater in Warsaw, then at the Studio Theater (1971–1977), the Kwadrat Theater (1978) and the Komedia Theater (1979–1981). Since 1981, he has been an actor at the Ateneum Theatre in Warsaw.

In 2015, he recorded an album with songs by Leonard Cohen and Jaromir Nohavica — Opania Cohen Nohavica.

Married to Anna, with whom they met in 1960.

== Awards ==
- Zbigniew Cybulski Award (1970)
- Meritorious Activist of Culture (1988)
- Order of Polonia Restituta (2003)
- Medal for Merit to Culture – Gloria Artis (2009).

== Selected discography ==
- Fascynacje (2013)

== Selected filmography ==
- Pearl in the Crown (1972)
- Man of Iron (1981)
- Dreszcze (1981)
- Hero of the Year (1987)
- Chopin: Desire for Love (2002)
