= Ryszard Pietruski =

Polish actor (born 1922)

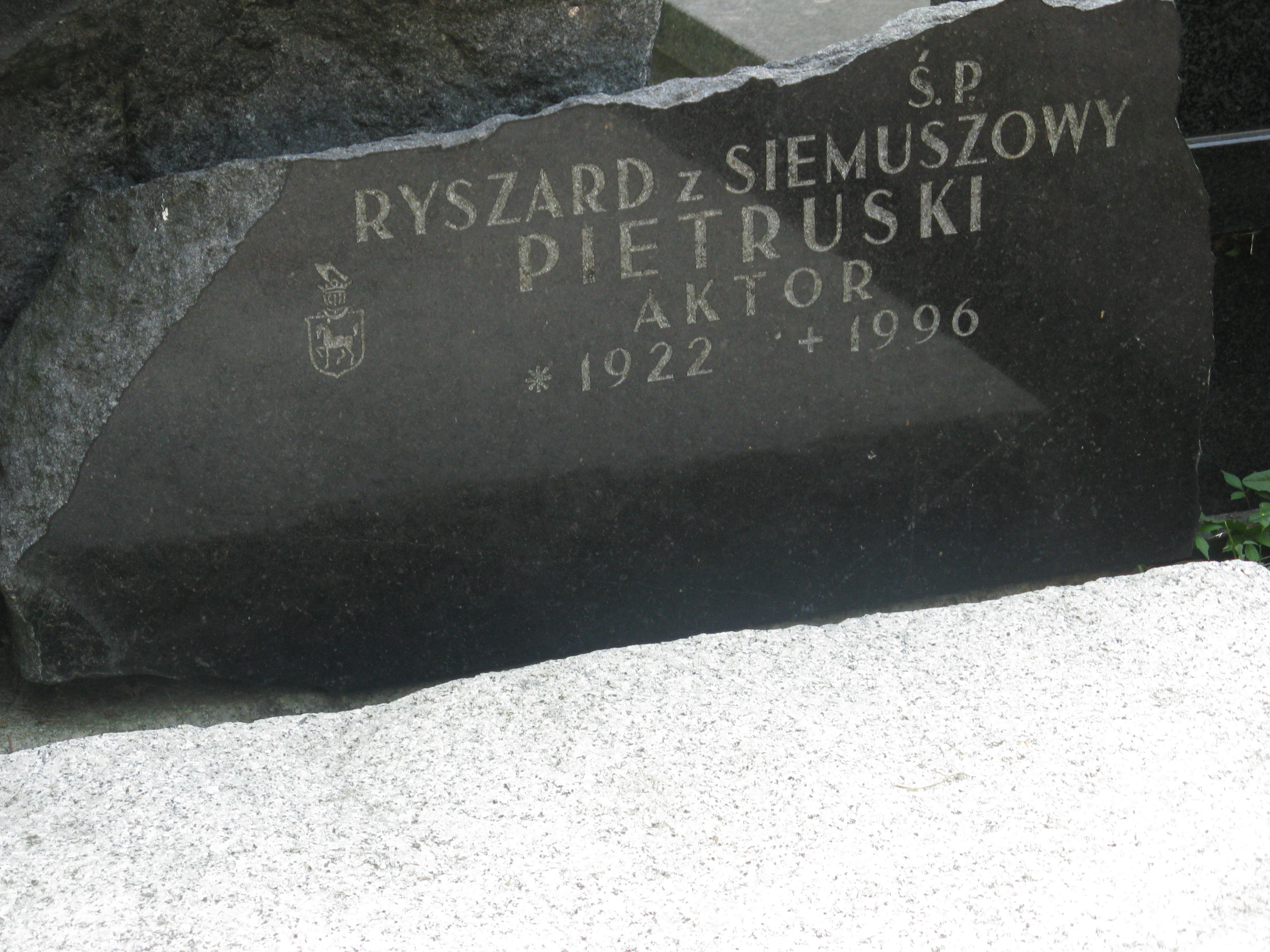
The grave of Richard Pietruski at the Powazki Military Cemetery

Ryszard Pietruski (born 7 October 1922 in Wyszecino near Wejherowo, died 14 September 1996 in Warsaw) was a Polish theatre and film actor.

== Biography ==
He spent his childhood and early days in Lviv. He was a student of the III State High School and Gymnasium in the name of King Stefan Batory in Lviv (in Polish Państwowego III Gimnazjum Męskiego im. Króla Stefana Batorego). During the war he worked in Lviv as a waiter in a restaurant. In 1944, after the second occupation of Lviv by the Red Army, he joined the Polish Army and fought as a soldier in the 4th Infantry Division. He participated in the liberation of Warsaw and in the battle of Kolobrzeg, among other events. Some biographical notes indicate that he also took part in the Battle of Lenino, although it is doubtful, given that the battle of Lenino took place in October 1943, and Ryszard Pietruski began service in LWP only in 1944.

In 1948 he passed his acting exams. Between 1978 and 1988 he was a director of the Warsaw Operetta.

He died as a result of a heart attack.

=== Family ===
His first wife was the actress Maria Homerska, with whom he had his daughter Magdalena. His second wife was architect Hanna Buczkowska-Pietruska.

== Career ==
- Musical Theatre of the Polish Army, Warsaw 1947–47 actor
- Municipal Theatre in the name of Stefan Jaracz, Olsztyn 1947–48 actor
- Theatre in the name of Stefan Żeromski, Kielce-Radom 1948–50 actor
- Dramatic Theatres, Szczecin 1950–55 actor
- Children's Theatre of Warsaw 1950–50 actor
- Theatre in the name of Julius Slovak, Kraków 1955–59 actor
- Classical Theatre, Warsaw 1959–67 actor
- Dramatic Theatre, Warsaw 1967–79 actor
- Operetta Warsaw 1978–79 managing director
- Operetta Warsaw 1979–88 managing and artistic director
- Operetta Warsaw 1988–89 assistant director

== Honours ==
- Order of Polonia Restituta (1984)
- Knight's Cross of the Order of the Rebirth of Poland (1975)
- Medal of the 30th Anniversary of People's Poland (1975)
- Medal of Merit for National Defence (1977)
- Badge of Merit to Culture (1977)
- Badge of merits to Warsaw (1975)
