= Jerzy Turek =

Polish actor and performer (1934–2010)

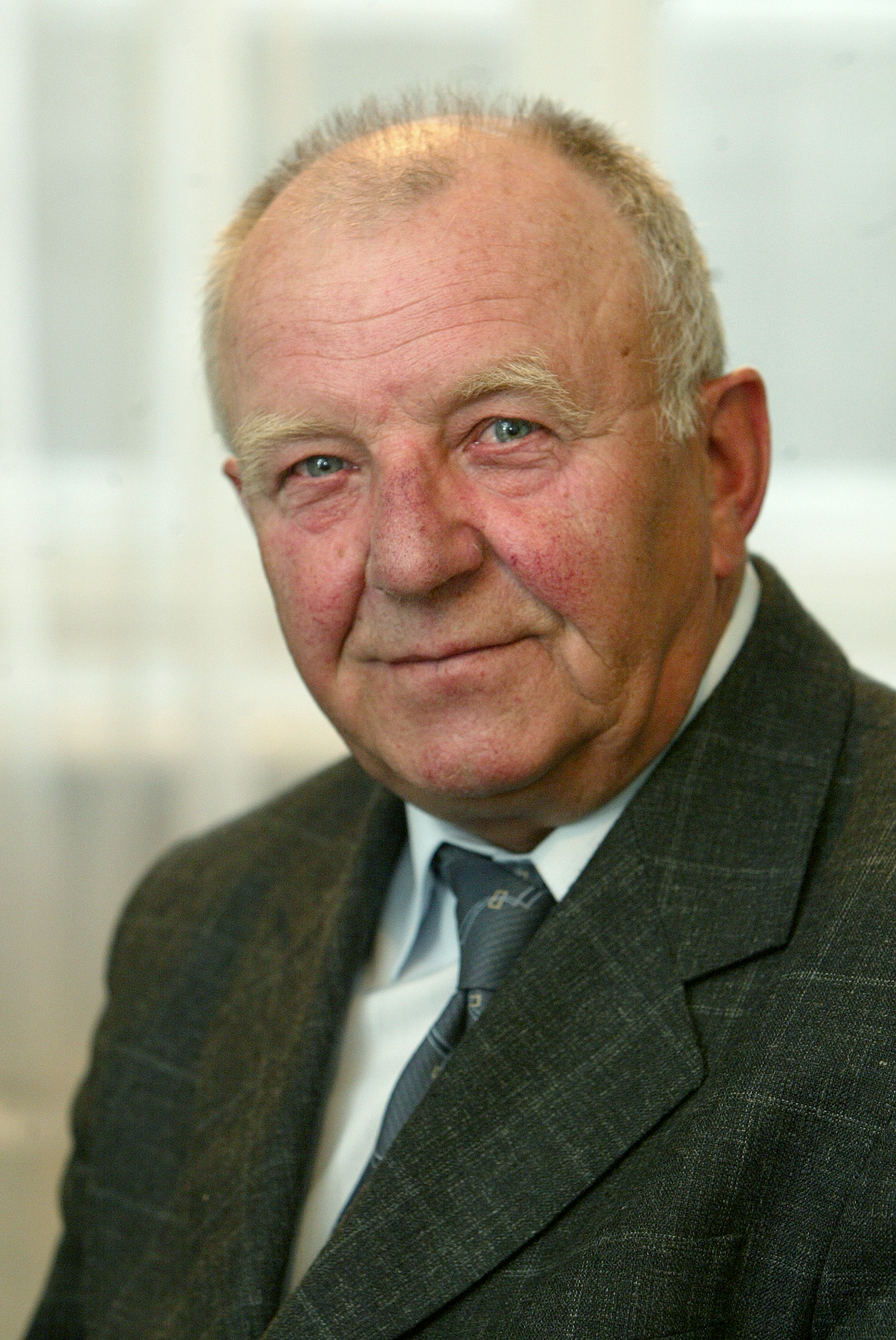
Jerzy Turek in 2003

Jerzy Turek (17 January 1934 – 14 February 2010) was a Polish actor and performer. Turek was born on 17 January 1934 in the eastern village of Tchórzowa. He died of leukemia on 14 February 2010 in Warsaw at the age of 76. Turek had been previously hospitalized in 2009 after suffering a stroke.

== Selected filmography ==
- Kwiecień (1961)
- I Hate Mondays (1971)
- Calls Controlled (1991)
