= Stefan Friedmann =

Polish actor

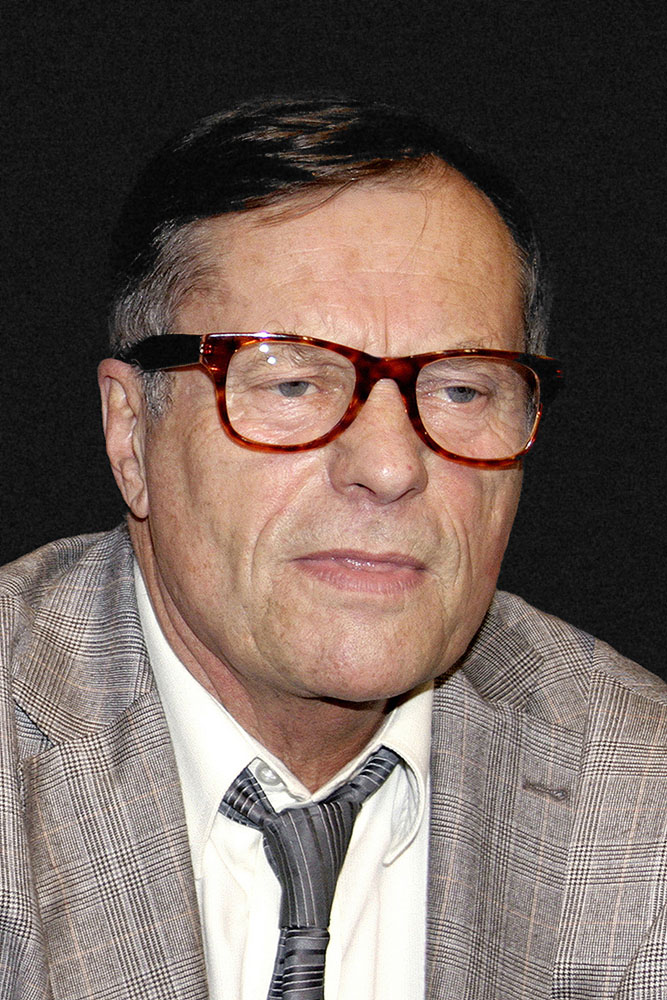
- Born: 2 September 1941 (age 84); Kraków, Poland
- Years active: 1955 -

Stefan Friedmann (born 2 September 1941) is a Polish actor. He has made over 40 appearances in film and television. He starred in the 1978 comedy film What Will You Do When You Catch Me?, He hosted the Miss Polski pageant.
