= Stanisława Celińska =

Polish actress (1947–2026)

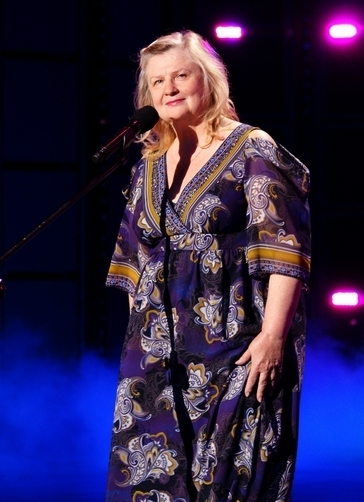
- Celińska in 2009
- Born: 29 April 1947; Warsaw, Poland
- Died: 12 May 2026 (aged 79)
- Occupations: Actress; voice actress

Stanisława Maria Celińska-Mrowiec (29 April 1947 – 12 May 2026) was a Polish actress. For her roles she won two Polish Film Awards and was nominated three times.

== Life and career ==
Celińska was born in Warsaw, Poland on 29 April 1947. In 1968, Celińska debuted in the theatre. A year later she graduated from Akademia Teatralna im. Aleksandra Zelwerowicza in Warsaw. In the following years, she performed in many Warsaw theatres. Celińska performed in Nowy Teatr and Teatr Współczesny, both in Warsaw. In 2015, her second album (Atramentowa) as a vocalist ranked high on the Polish charts and became a gold album.

In 1986, she was awarded a Silver Cross of Merit, a Polish civil state award recognizing services to the state.

Celińska died on 12 May 2026, at the age of 79.

== Filmography ==
Year	Film	Role	Awards
2010	Joanna	Kamińska	Polish Film Awards for Best actress in a supporting role
2008	And a Warm Heart	Ex-wife	
2008	Unmoved Mover		
2007	Katyń	Stasia	
2007	Ryś	Ligeza	
2007	South by North	Woman with Cows	Polish Film Awards for Best actress in a supporting role - nomination
2007	Jasne błękitne okna	Rogasiowa	
2006	Schroeder's Wonderful World	Hanna Krukowska	
2004	Miracle in Cracow	Zura néni	
2001	Money Is Not Everything	Miss Ala	Polish Film Awards for Best actress in a supporting role
2000	Musisz życ	Teresa	
2000	Operacja Koza	Krepska	
1999	Fuks	Mrs. Poznanska	Polish Film Awards for Best actress in a supporting role - nomination
1998	Złoto dezerterów		
1998	Złote runo	Rysio's sister-in-law	Polish Film Awards for Best actress in a leading role - nomination
1997	Kroniki domowe	Aunt	
1997	Nocne graffiti	Poland	
1996	Panna Nikt	Ewa	
1996	Cwal	Justyna Winewar	
1995	Pestka	Neighbor	
1995	Polska śmierć	Wirska	
1995	Awantura o Basię		
1994	Faustyna	Sister Marcelina	
1994	Straszny sen Dzidziusia Górkiewicza		
1993	Balanga	Barmaid at disco	
1993	Rozmowa z człowiekiem z szafy	Postwoman	
1991	Femina	Passenger in the train	
1990	Kramarz	Maria	
1990	Korczak	Saleswoman	
1990	Historia niemoralna	Neighbor	
1989	Galimatias, czyli kogel-mogel II	Goździkowa	
1988	Amerykanka		
1983	Lucky Edge	Anna	
1981	Miłość ci wszystko wybaczy	Aniela	
1979	The Maids of Wilko	Zosia	
1977	Sam na sam	Waitress Danka	
1975	Zaklęte rewiry	Hela	
1975	Nights and Days	Agnieszka Niechcic	
1974	A Jungle Book of Regulations	Lusia	
1970	Landscape After the Battle	Nina	

=== Television ===
Year	Show	Role	Notes
2009	Warszawa	Mamuśka	
2007	Mamuśki	Halina Czajka	31 episodes
2007	Dylematu 5	Bożena Lewicka	
2006	Hela w opalach	Krystyna Trojanska	2 episodes
2005	Na dobre i na zle	Teresa Grabowska	1 episode
2004	Bulionerzy	Jadzia Bystrzycka	
2002	Samo życie	Janina Kubiak	
1999	Ekstradycja 3	Lucyna	
1999	Siedlisko	Helena Misztal	
1998	Sława i chwała	Tekla	
1998	Złotopolscy	Klementyna Kesik	unknown episodes, 1997–2002
1998	13 posterunek	Aunt	1 episode
1998	Miodowe lata	Jadwiga	1 episode
1997	Little Faith	Lab Manager	
1996	Bar Atlantic		
1995	Dama kameliowa	Julia Duprat	
1995	Spis cudzołożnic	Iza Gesiareczka	
1993	Nothing But Fear	Dr. Nowacka	
1990	Zmowa	Siejbowa	
1989	Spadek	Agnieszka	
1988	Sami dla siebie	Grossmanowa	
1986	Alternatywy 4	Bożena Lewicka	9 episodes
1986	Zmiennicy	Lusia Walicka	1 episode
1985	Hamlet in the Middle of Nowhere		
1980	Klucznik	Count's daughter	
1975	Dom moich synów	Bożenka	
1973	Hipoteza	Student/Worker/Patient/Painter	
1973	Droga	Jadwiga Sek	1 episode
1972	Na przełaj		
1971	Piżama		

=== Polish dubbing ===
Year	Film	Role	Notes
2009	The Princess and the Frog	Mama Odie	
2008	Bolt	Esther	
2006	Cars	Lola	
2005	Oliver Twist	Mrs. Sowerberry	
2005	Racing Stripes	Franny	
2004	Around the World in 80 Days	Queen Victoria	
2000	The Little Mermaid II: Return to the Sea	Morgana	
2000	Help! I'm a Fish	Aunt Anna	
1998	Rudolph the Red-Nosed Reindeer: The Movie	Stormella	
1994	The Pagemaster		
1994	Country Life	Hannah	
1992	Tom and Jerry: The Movie	"Aunt" Figg	
1989	The Little Mermaid	Ursula	
