= Bronisław Pawlik =

Polish actor

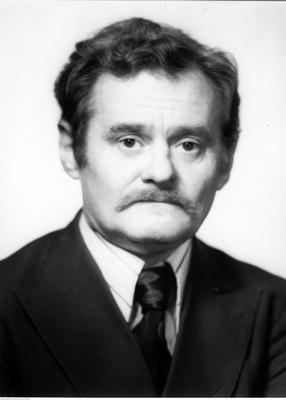
- Bronisław Pawlik starring in Miś z okienka
- Born: 8 January 1926; Kraków, Poland
- Died: 6 May 2002 (aged 76); Warsaw, Poland
- Burial place: Powązki Cemetery
- Years active: 1951–2002

Bronisław Pawlik (8 January 1926 – 6 May 2002) was a Polish actor. He starred in the TV series Stawka większa niż życie and 1978 comedy film What Will You Do When You Catch Me?. At the 1st Moscow International Film Festival (1959) he won a Silver Medal for acting for his role in the film The Eagle.

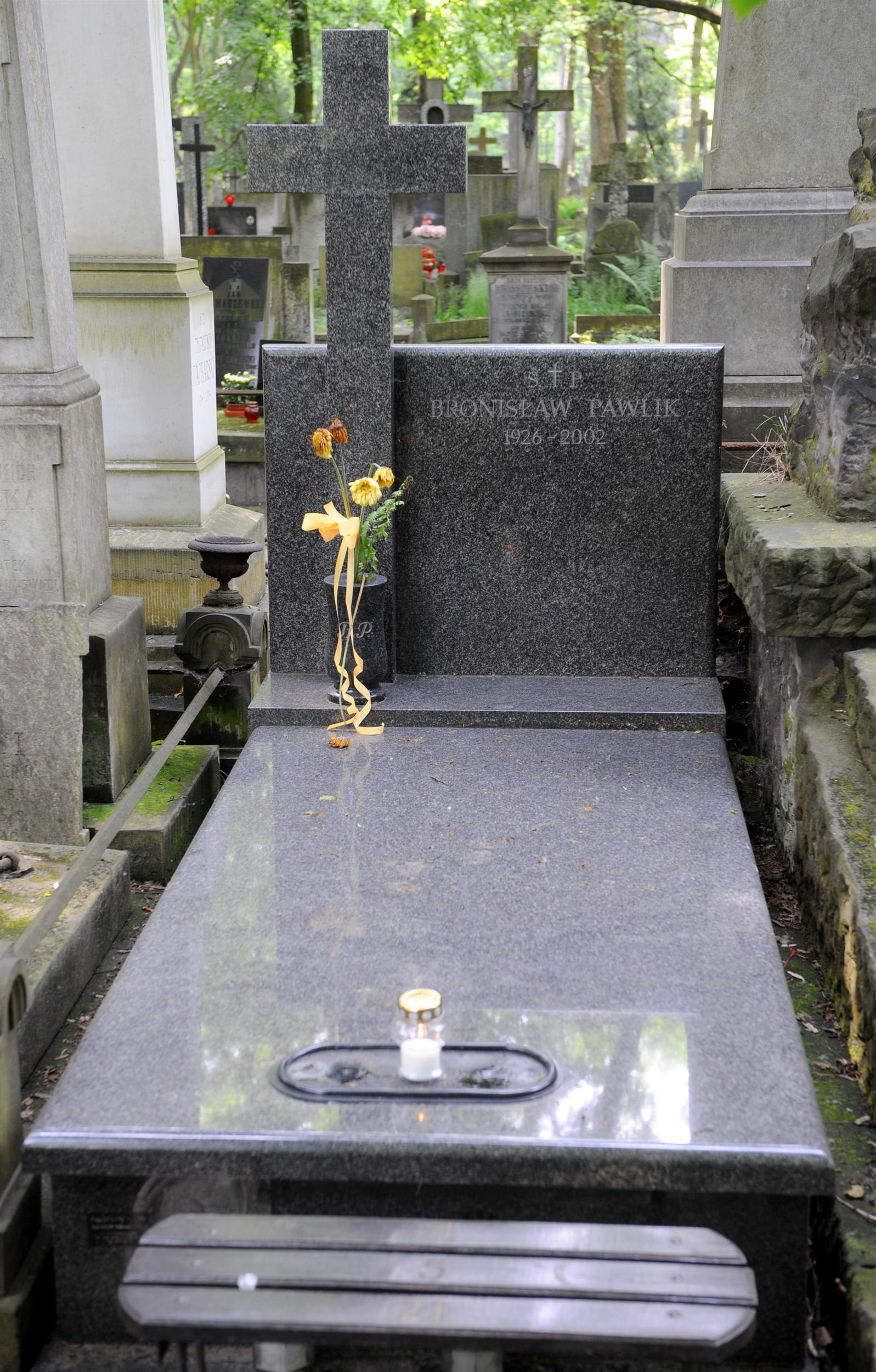
Grób aktora na cmentarzu Powązkowskim (2008)

== Selected filmography ==
- Warsaw Premiere (1951)
- Smarkula (1963)
- Nieznany (1964)
- Hrabina Cosel (1968)
- Lalka (1977; TV series)
- Miś (1980)
- Decalogue VIII (1988)
- Szabla od komendanta (1995)

== Honours and awards ==
- Commander's Cross of the Order of Polonia Restituta for outstanding contribution to Polish culture (30 April 2001; Knight's Cross awarded in 1965)
- Badge of the 1000th anniversary of the Polish State (1967)
- Badge of Merit in Culture (1980)
- Badge "For merits for Warsaw" (1978)
- Medal 400 years of capital city of Warsaw (1997)
- Grand Prize Splendor (1988)
