= Teddy Bear (1981 film) =

1980 Polish comedy film

- Poster for Miś
- Directed by: Stanisław Bareja
- Written by: Stanisław Tym; Stanisław Bareja
- Starring: Stanisław Tym; Barbara Burska; Christine Paul-Podlasky
- Cinematography: Zdzisław Kaczmarek
- Music by: Jerzy Derfel
- Production company: Zespol Filmowy "Perspektywa"
- Release date: 1981
- Running time: 111 minutes
- Country: Poland
- Languages: Polish; English

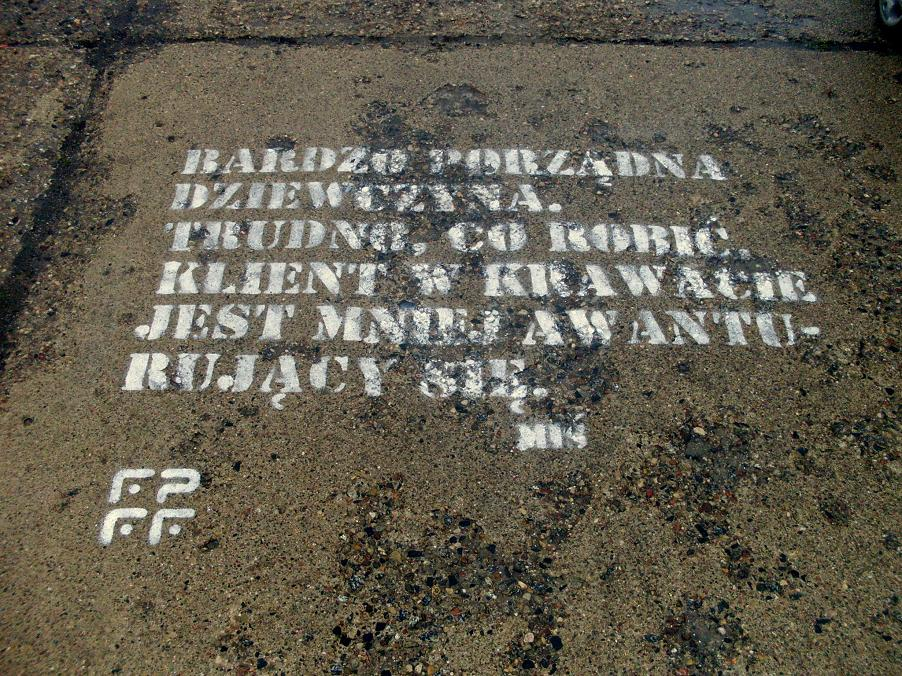
Quotation from Teddy Bear advertising the XXXIV Polish Film Festival in Gdynia 2009

Teddy Bear (Polish: Miś [miɕ]) is a 1981 Polish comedy film directed by Stanisław Bareja. Teddy Bear, along with The Cruise (Rejs), was a reflection of contemporary Polish society using surreal humor to somehow get past the censorship at the time. It gained cult status in its native country. Later, the film was reappraised by critics and it has been regarded as one of the best Polish films ever made.

== Plot ==
Rysiek (Stanisław Tym, who also co-wrote the screenplay), the shrewd manager of a state-sponsored sports club, has to travel to London before his ex-wife Irena (Barbara Burska) gets there to collect a large sum of money from their joint savings account.

However, getting out of a communist country is never easy, even for a well-connected operator like Rysiek. After his wife destroys Rysiek's hard-to-get passport, he is stranded in Warsaw, while she's off to London. The circumstances force him to plot a Byzantine scheme with the support of his equally cunning friend. Their plan involves a movie production as well as tracking down a look-alike (also played by Tym) to "borrow" their passport.

Hilarity ensues as Bareja gives the audience a guided tour of the corruption, absurd bureaucracy, pervasive bribery and flourishing black market that pervaded socialism in the People's Republic of Poland.

The titular (teddy) bear is a nickname given to the main character, but also a big straw-bear used in a corruption scheme. Perhaps playing on the well-established Russian Bear trope, Misha is the mascot of the 1980 Moscow Olympic Games, the same year as the film.

== Cast ==
- Stanisław Tym as Ryszard Ochódzki and Stanisław Paluch
- Barbara Burska as Irena Ochódzka
- Krystyna Podleska (Christine Paul-Podlasky) as Aleksandra Kozel
- Krzysztof Kowalewski as Jan Hochwander
- Bronisław Pawlik as Stuwała
- Ewa Bem as herself
- Zofia Czerwińska as Irena Siwna
- Stanisław Mikulski as "Captain Ryś" a.k.a. "Wujek Dobra Rada" ("Uncle Good-Advice")
- Wojciech Pokora as Włodarczyk
- Eugeniusz Priwieziencew as a militiaman
- Hanna Skarżanka
- Kent Washington as basketball player

== See also ==
- Cinema of Poland
- List of Polish language films
