= Stanisław Bareja =

Polish film director (1929–1987)

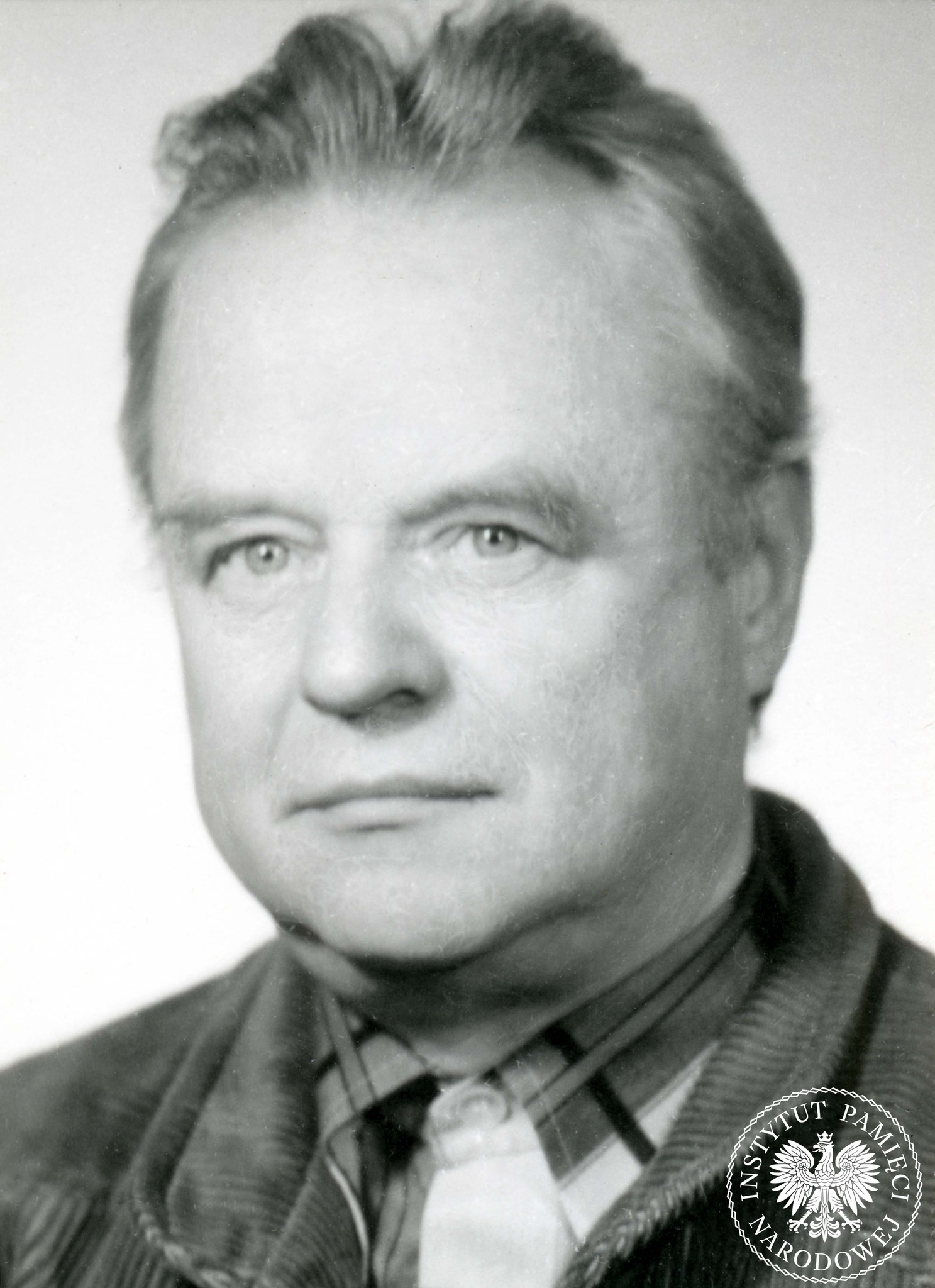
- Stanisław Bareja (1987)
- Born: 5 December 1929; Warsaw, Poland
- Died: 14 June 1987 (aged 57); Essen, West Germany
- Occupations: Filmmaker, actor, comedian

Stanisław Sylwester Bareja (5 December 1929 – 14 June 1987) was a Polish filmmaker. Some of his films (mostly comedies) have reached cult status in Poland.

His most famous film is Teddy Bear (Miś), filmed in 1980. His last work was Zmiennicy, a TV series completed in 1986 and aired in 1987.

On 21 September 2006 Bareja was posthumously awarded the Commander's Cross of the Order of Polonia Restituta by President Lech Kaczynski and in 2005, a street in Warsaw was named after Stanislaw Bareja.

== Works ==
=== Director ===
- Zmiennicy (1986)
- Alternatywy 4 (1983)
- Teddy Bear (Miś, 1981)
- What Will You Do When You Catch Me? (Co mi zrobisz, jak mnie złapiesz?, 1978)
- Brunet Will Call (Brunet wieczorową porą, 1976)
- Incredibly peaceful man (Niespotykanie spokojny człowiek, 1975)
- A Jungle Book of Regulations (Nie ma róży bez ognia, 1974)
- Man - Woman Wanted (Poszukiwany poszukiwana, 1972)
- Adventure with a Song (Przygoda z piosenką, 1968)
- The Marriage of Convenience (Małżeństwo z rozsądku, 1966)
- Kapitan Sowa na tropie (1965)
- Wife for an Australian (Żona dla Australijczyka, 1963)
- The Touch of the Night (Dotknięcie nocy, 1961)
- Husband of His Wife (Mąż swojej żony, 1960)

=== Scripts ===
- Zmiennicy (1986)
- Alternatywy 4 (1983)
- Teddy Bear (Miś, 1980)
- What Will You Do When You Catch Me? (Co mi zrobisz, jak mnie złapiesz?, 1978)
- Brunet Will Call (Brunet wieczorową porą, 1976)
- A Jungle Book of Regulations (Nie ma róży bez ognia, 1974)
- Man - Woman Wanted (Poszukiwany poszukiwana, 1972)
- Adventure with a Song (Przygoda z piosenką, 1968)
- Barbara i Jan (1964), with Jerzy Ziarnik
- Husband of His Wife (Mąż swojej żony, 1960), with Jerzy Jurandot

=== Actor ===
- Zmiennicy (1986)
- Alternatywy 4 (1983)
- Teddy Bear (Miś, 1980)
- Dom (1980–2000)
- The Lesniewski Family (Rodzina Leśniewskich, 1978)
- What Will You Do When You Catch Me? (Co mi zrobisz, jak mnie złapiesz?, 1978)
- Lalka (1977)
- Brunet Will Call (Brunet wieczorową porą, 1976)
- Man - Woman Wanted (Poszukiwany poszukiwana, 1972)
- Mr Anatol's Inspection (Inspekcja pana Anatola, 1959)
- Little Town (Miasteczko, 1958)
- Mr. Anatol's Hat (Kapelusz pana Anatola, 1957)
- Heroism (Eroica, 1957)
- Winter Twilight (Zimowy Zmierzch, 1956)
- Charcoal Sketches (Szkice węglem, 1956)
- Nikodem Dyzma (1956)
- Three Starts (Trzy starty, 1955)
