= Mieczysław Czechowicz =

Polish actor (1930–1991)

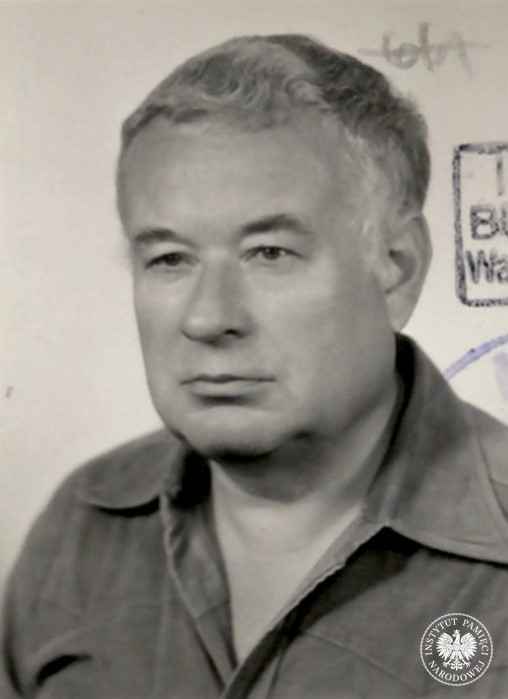
- Born: 28 September 1930; Lublin, Poland
- Died: 14 September 1991 (aged 60); Warsaw, Poland
- Occupation: Actor

Mieczysław Czechowicz (28 September 1930 in Lublin – 14 September 1991 in Warsaw) was a Polish actor, one of the most famous of all time.

== Career ==
A graduate of Warsaw's State Theatrical Academy (Państwowa Wyższa Szkoła Teatralna), Czechowicz played in numerous films, plays and cabarets. He worked for the National Theatre as well as other Warsaw theatres.

He featured in the 1965 film Three Steps on Earth.

In 1987 he was awarded the Polonia Restituta. As a movie actor, he played in such productions, as Janosik (TV series), Czterej Pancerni i Pies, Lalka, The Tin Drum, and comedies by Stanisław Bareja. Czechowicz's voice is known by almost all kids in Poland, as he voiced the friendly teddy bear in a popular animation Miś Uszatek.
