= Sobień Castle =

Coordinates: 49.5269°N 22.3292°E

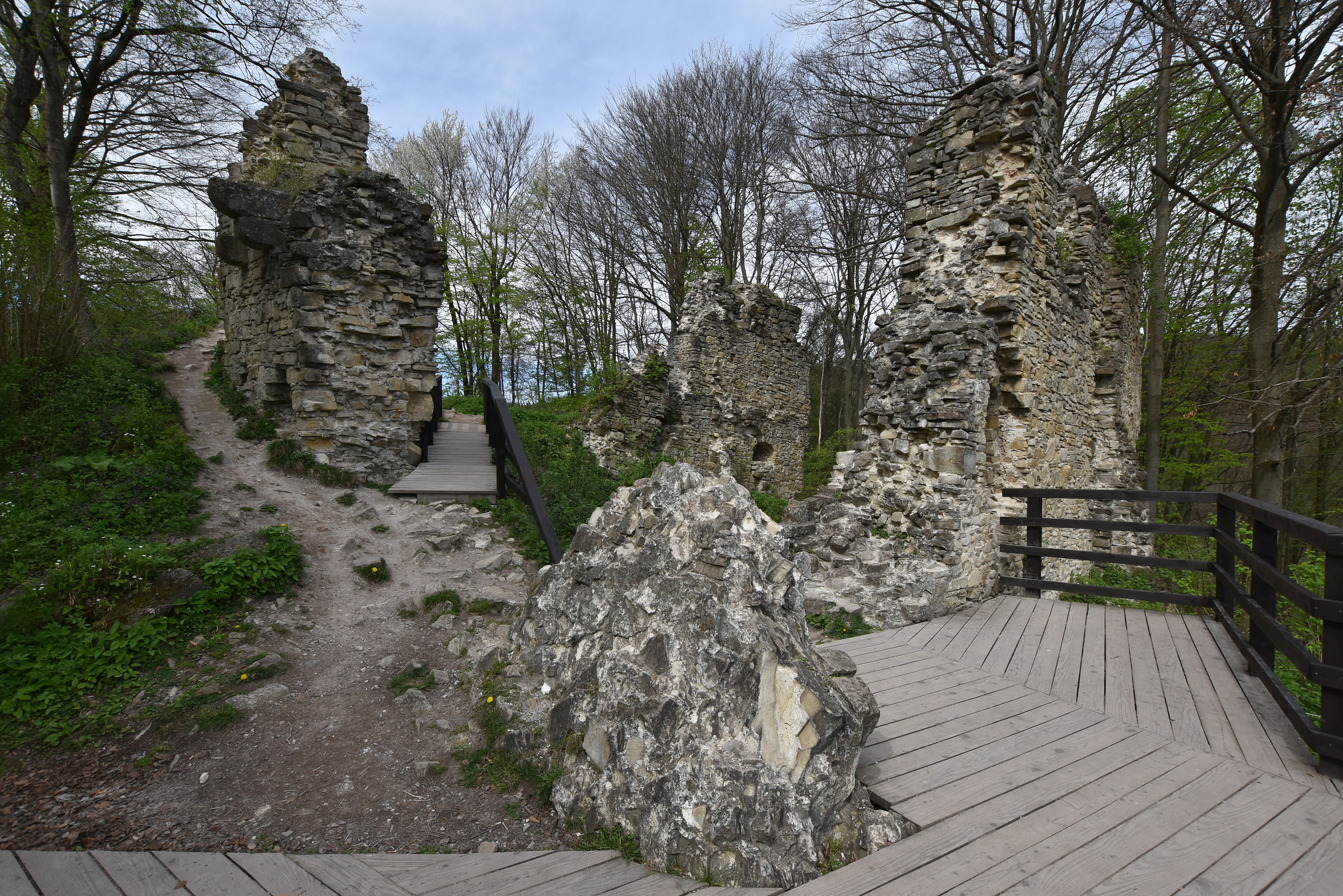
- Interactive map of the Sobień Castle area

General information
- Status: Ruins
- Location: Manasterzec, Lesko County, Poland

Sobień (Soban 1372, castro Sobyen 1460) is a medieval castle in the San river valley, at the feet of Eastern Carpathian mountains, in the Manasterzec village in Lesko County, Subcarpathian Voivodeship in Poland.

== History ==
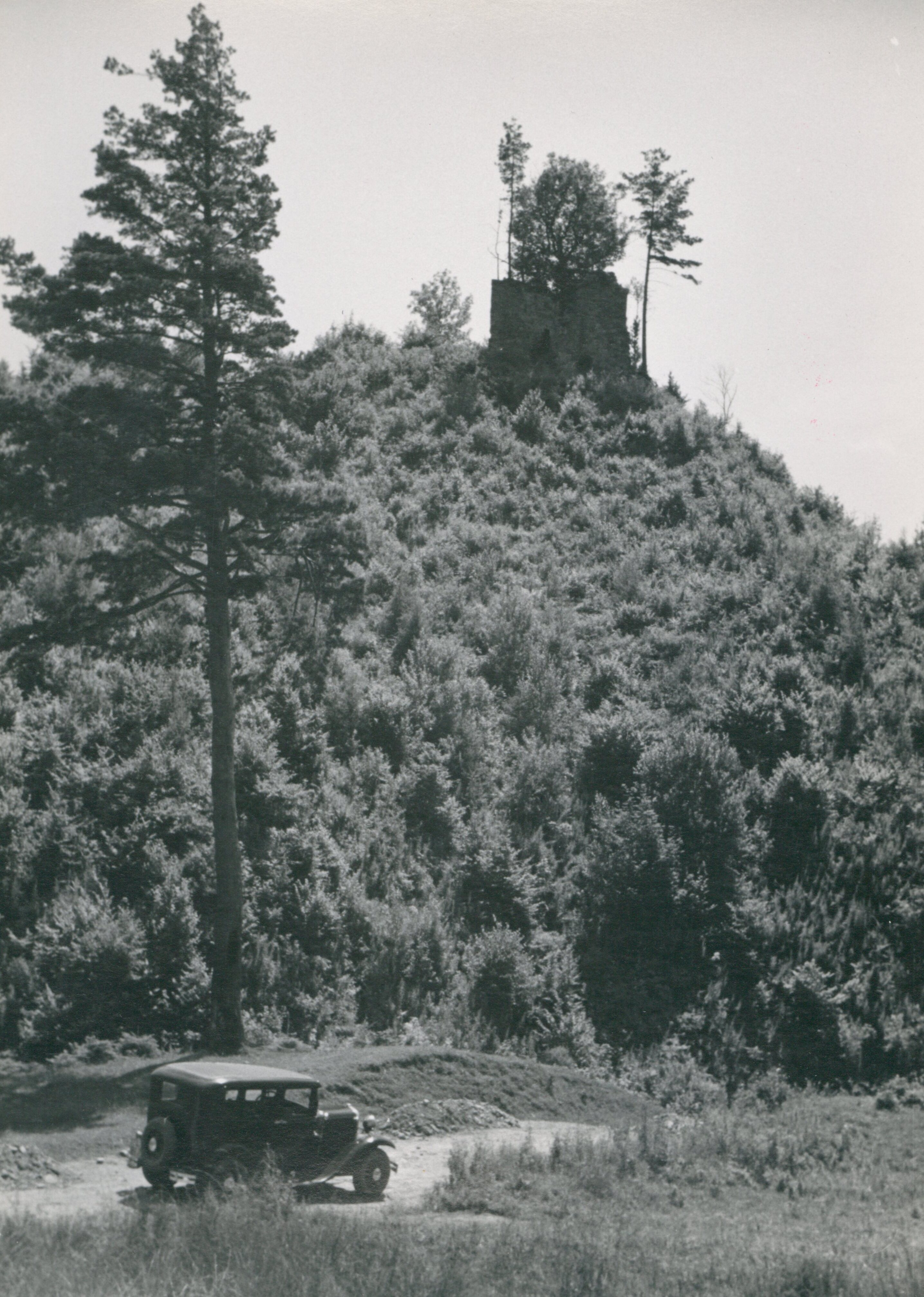
Ruins of the castle in the 1930s

First mentioned as Soban, it was a royal castle guarding the merchant route along the San River. The castle was built by order of King Casimir III the Great in 1340.

In 1389 King Władysław II Jagiełło conferred the castle to a noble family of Kmita.

The castle was destroyed in 1474 and again in 1512 by Hungarian forces. In the 16th century, the Kmita family sold the estates and the castle to the Stadnicki family, who held it until 1713.

=== List of owners ===
- Stefan - son of Wojosta from Sobniów first received the castle in 1359.
- 1389–1580 Kmita Family.
  - Jan Kmita (1330–1376) - starost of Ruthenia and of Kraków
  - Piotr Kmita (1348–1409) - voivode of Kraków
  - Klemens Kmita - (1421) - starost of Sanok.
  - Jan Kmita - brother of Małgorzata Kmita.
  - Małgorzata Kmita wife of Przedpełka Mościca from Wielki Koźmin
  - Mikołaj Kmita from Wiśnicz - castellan of Przemyśl
  - Jan Kmita (died 1450)
  - Jan Kmita (died 1458/1460) - castellan of Lwow,
  - Andrzej Kmita
  - Dobiesław Kmita (died 1478) - voivode of Lublin
  - Jan and Stanisław Kmita
  - Maciej Kmita - podkomorzy (chamberlain) of Sanok
  - Stanisław Kmita (ok. 1450–1511) - castellan of Sanok, Voivode of Ruthenia
  - Piotr Kmita Sobieński (1477–1553) - Grand Marshal of the Crown, Voivode of Krakow
  - Barbara Kmita z Felsztyna
- 1580–1713 Stadnicki Family
- 1713–1803 Ossoliński, Mniszech families - as dowry of Teresa Stadnicka to her husband Józef Kanty Ossoliński
- 1803–1939 Krasicki Family from Sienna - as dowry of Julia Teresa Wandalin-Mniszech

== See also ==
- Castles in Poland
