= Novi Velidnyky =

Village in Ukraine

Novi Velidnyky Нові Велідники
- Coordinates: 51°19′03″N 28°27′37″E
- Country: Ukraine
- Oblast: Zhytomyr
- Raion: Korosten
- First mention: 1499

Population (1859)
  - Total: 1,140

Novi Velidnyky (Ukrainian: Нові Велідники, New Velidnyky) is a village in Korosten Raion, Ukraine, the administrative center of Novovilednicka rural council.

In the past it was known simply as Velidnyky, Russian name: Veledniki, Polish: Wieledniki, Yiddish: Vilednik. Nearby there is the village of Old Velidnyky (Stari Velidnyky).

== History ==
The Geographical Dictionary of the Kingdom of Poland describes Wieledniki as a miasteczko by the mouth of Pleszczaha (Iłinka) river (Illimka River) entering the Noryn River in powiat Owrucki, gmina Noryn, 157 households, 1,118 persons.

The recorded history of the settlement dates back to 1499, when during the distribution of a heritage in the Kmitycz family the manor of Welednykowicze was mentioned. A 1545 local census recorded the village of Wielednykowicze in the property of Krzysztof Kmitycz. In 1581 a Wieledniki miasteczko was recorded in the property of a Filon Kmita Czarnobylski. Further years record further changes of the ownership.

=== Jewish history ===
In early 19th century Veledniki was the center of Chasidism in Volhynia. By the end of the century there were two synagogues. In 1859 there were 659 Jews, in 125 households, almost 50% of the population of total 1140.

The ohel of Israel Dov Ber of Vilednik is located there (51.318029°N 28.457709°E), a Chasidic pilgrimage site.

In 1924 there were 427 Jews, of about a quarter of the village population.

On October 18, 1941, a massacre of the Velidnyky Jews who didn't escape to the East, was carried out by the Nazis. The number of victims is estimated between 38 (by Soviet documents) and 93 (as inscribed on the monument erected at the murder site in 2000s.

After the war many returned Jews from Velidnyky settled in Ovruch, because their houses were looted or taken by the Ukrainians. The last Jew of Velidnyky moved to Korosten in 1970s.
