= Kmicic =

Kmicic is a Polish noble patronymic surname literally meaning "descendant of Kmita". A variant of the surname is Kmitycz.

The Kmicic family, of the Radzic II coat of arms, came from Orsza and was of no particular note.

Notable people with the surname include:

- Andrzej Kmicic, fictional character created by Henryk Sienkiewicz featured in the novel The Deluge
- Samuel Kmicic, a nobleman from Grand Duchy of Lithuania in the Polish-Lithuanian Commonwealth
