= Golub-Dobrzyń =

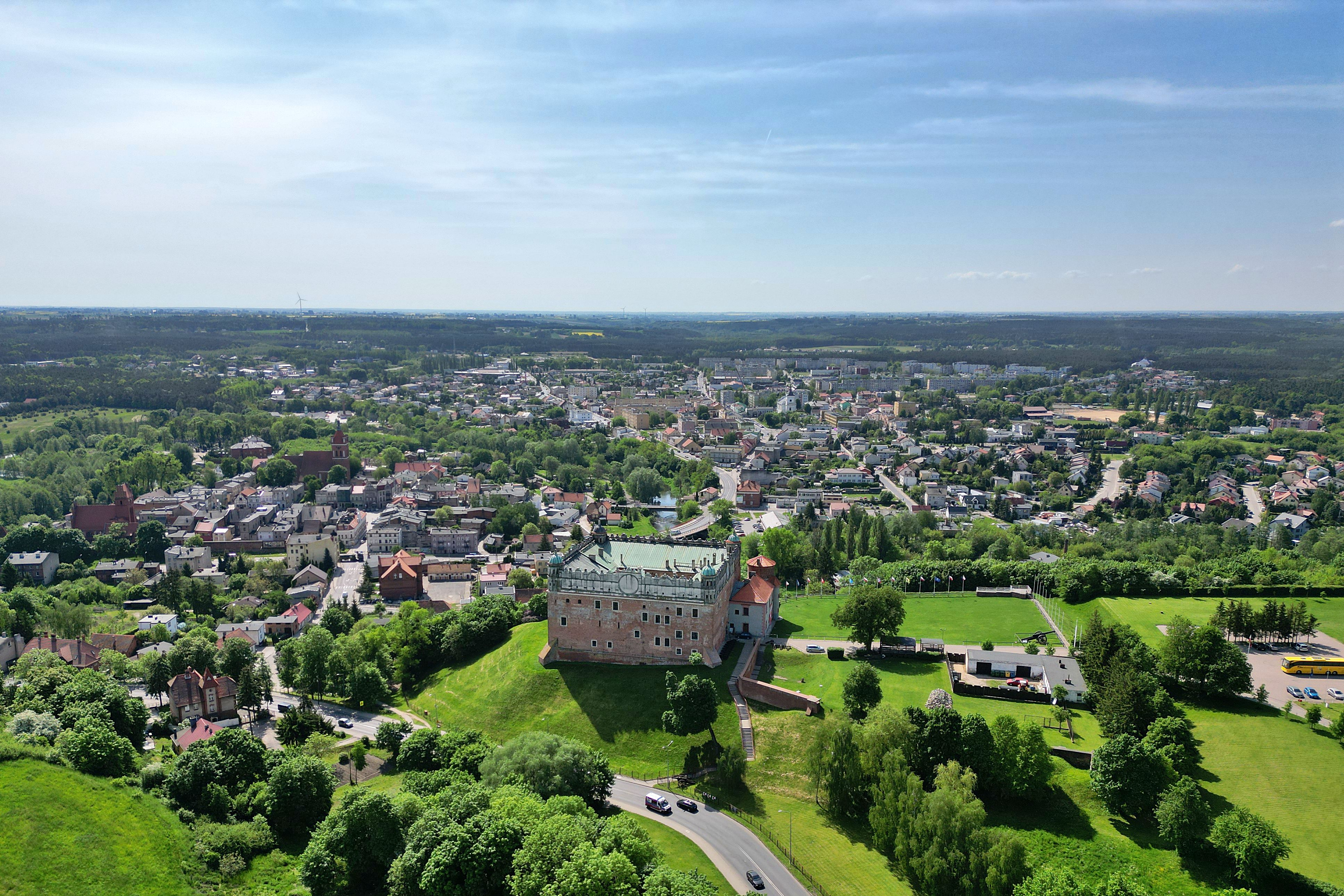
- Aerial view of Golub (on the left) and Dobrzyń (on the right) with the Golub Castle in the front

- Flag Coat of arms

- Location within Poland
- Coordinates: 53°6′N 19°3′E
- Country: Poland
- Voivodeship: Kuyavian-Pomeranian
- County: Golub-Dobrzyń
- Gmina: Golub-Dobrzyń (urban gmina)

Government
  - Mayor: Mariusz Piątkowski

Area
  - Total: 7.50 km^{2} (2.90 sq mi)

Population (2013)
  - Total: 13,060
  - Density: 1,741/km^{2} (4,510/sq mi)
- Time zone: UTC+1 (CET)
  - Summer (DST): UTC+2 (CEST)
- Postal code: 87-400, 87-401
- Car plates: CGD
- Website: www.golub-dobrzyn.pl

Golub-Dobrzyń (Polish pronunciation: [ˈɡɔlup ˈdɔbʐɨɲ]) is a town in north-central Poland, located on the Drwęca. It is the capital of Golub-Dobrzyń County in the Kuyavian-Pomeranian Voivodeship and has a population of 13,060.

Golub-Dobrzyń was established on 5 May 1951 through merging two neighbouring towns having faced each other across the river Drwęca for centuries, namely Golub located in the Chełmno Land within historical Pomerelia and Dobrzyń located in the Dobrzyń Land within historical Kuyavia.

== History ==
=== History of Golub ===
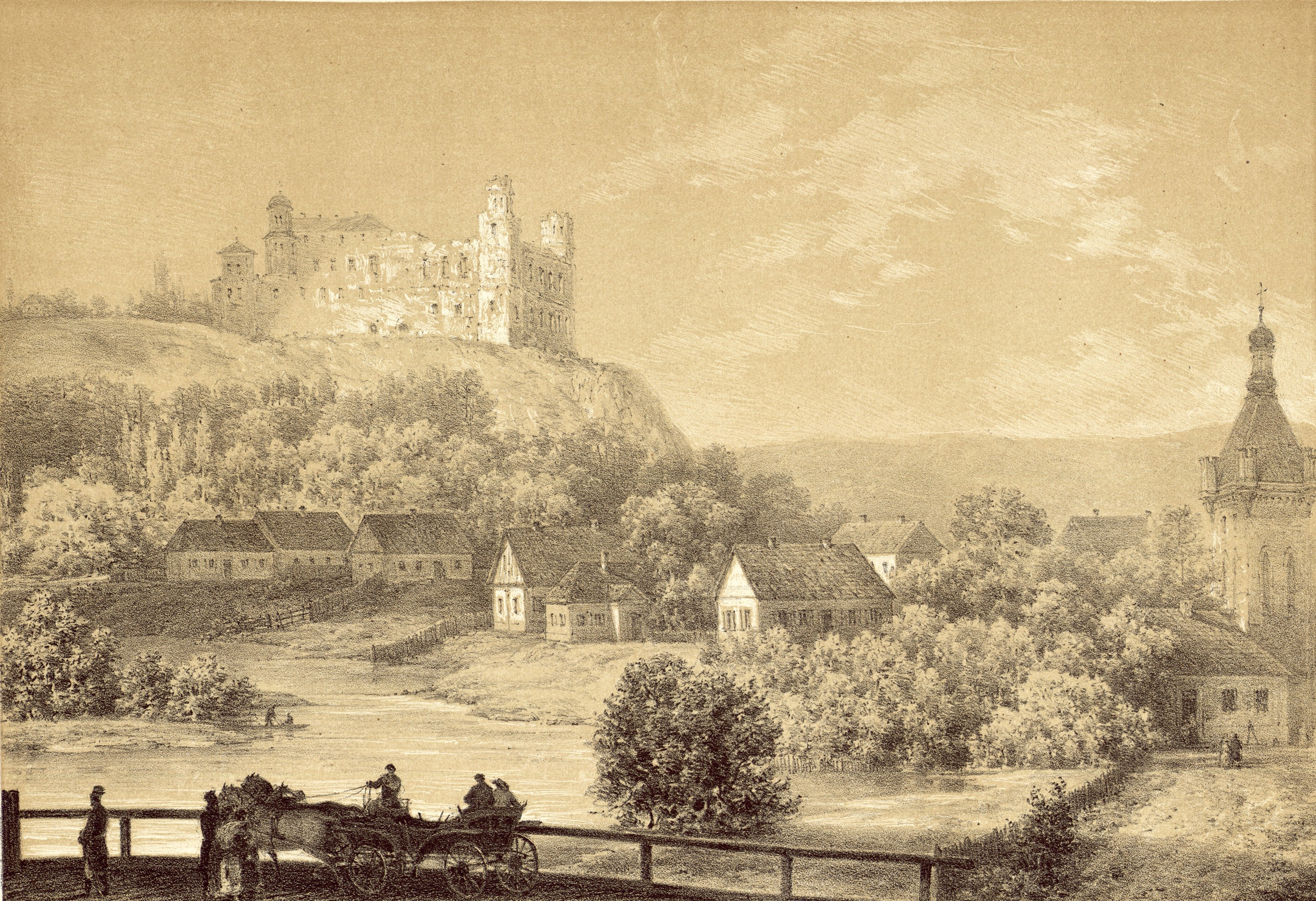
19th-century lithograph of Golub by Napoleon Orda

The village Golub was first mentioned in a document from 1258; Chełmno Land was granted as a fief by the Duke of Mazovia to the Teutonic Knights in 1231 in return for their forthcoming crusade against the heathen Prussians. The Teutonic Knights built a castle (1296–1306) and elevated it to town status. In the 14th century, papal verdicts ordered the restoration of the area to Poland, however, the Teutonic Knights did not comply and continued to occupy the region. In 1421 all privileges of the town were confirmed by Grand Master Michael Küchmeister von Sternberg. In 1410 and 1422, the castle and town were captured by the Poles, and Golub was severely damaged, with the war of 1422 called the Golub War. In March 1454, King Casimir IV Jagiellon reincorporated the town into the Kingdom of Poland, and on 28 May 1454 it pledged allegiance to the Polish King in Toruń. During the subsequent Thirteen Years' War, it was captured by the Teutonic Knights in 1460, and recaptured by the Poles in 1462. Reintegration with Poland was confirmed in the Second Peace of Toruń (1466).

Golub was a royal town of Poland, administratively located in the Chełmno County in the Chełmno Voivodeship. A degree of prosperity for Golub was reached during the reign of King Sigismund III Vasa 1611-25. In 1605, Anna Vasa, sister of Sigismund III, became the starost of Golub, and she lived in the Golub Castle. In 1623, she was visited in Golub by Sigismund III. However the town was severely damaged during Polish-Swedish Wars, especially in 1626-29, 1655, and 1660, as well as the later Seven Years' War (1756–63). In the First Partition of Poland in 1772, Golub was annexed by the Kingdom of Prussia. From 1807-15 it belonged to Napoleon's Duchy of Warsaw. It was assigned to the Duchy of Poznan in 1815, and in 1817 it was included in West Prussia which in 1871 became part of Imperial Germany. According to the German census of 1890, Golub had a population of 2,738, of which 1,000 (36.5%) were Poles.

In January 1920 it became again part of Poland under the Treaty of Versailles. In August 1920, the Red Army attacked the town. Following the joint German-Soviet invasion of Poland, which started World War II in September 1939, the town was occupied and unilaterally annexed by Nazi Germany and most of dwellers were forced to sign the Volksliste.

=== History of Dobrzyń ===
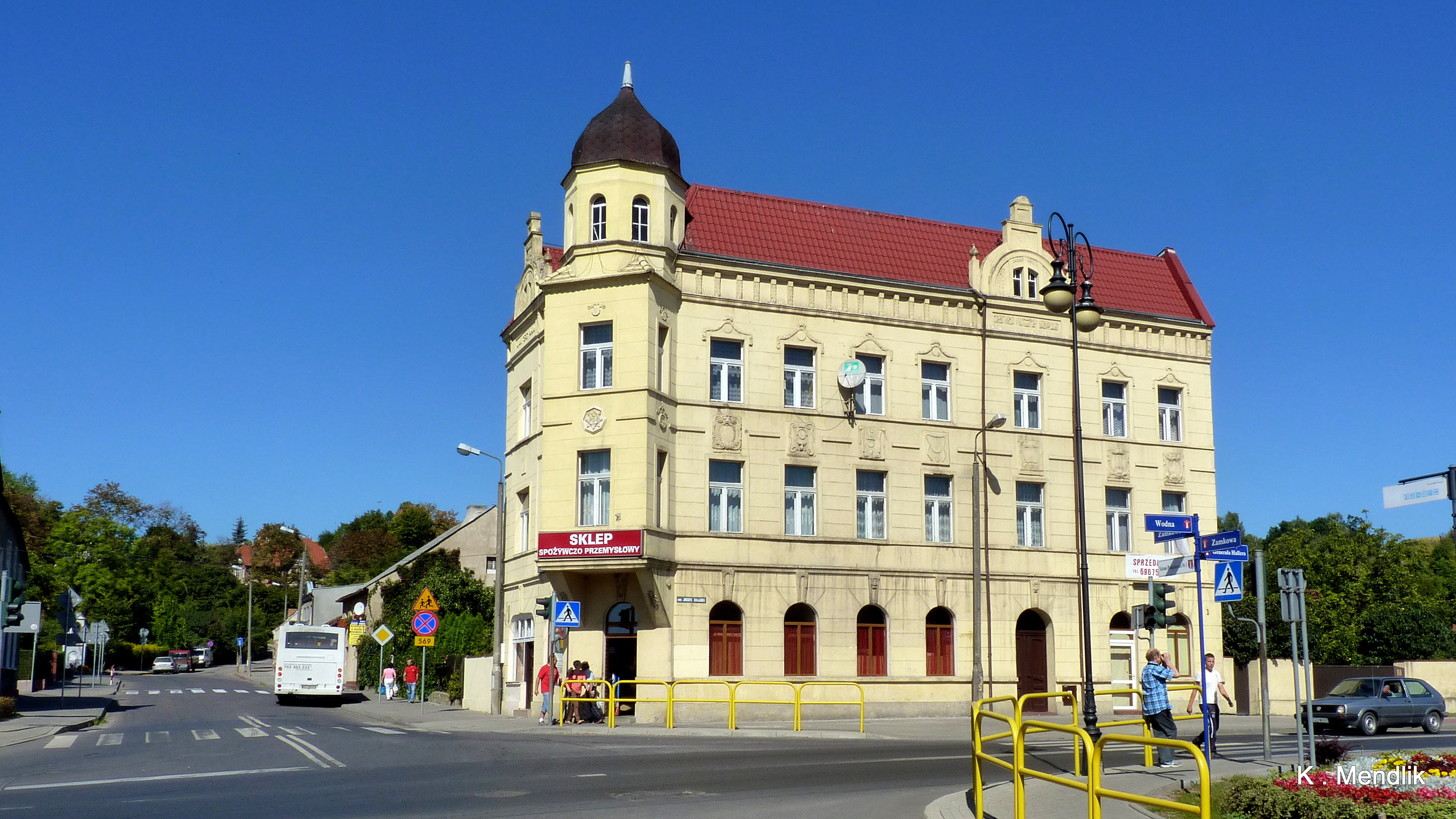
Historical tenement

Since the second half of the 17th century, Dobrzyń existed as a settlement on the loft bank of the Drwęca. In 1684 Zygmunt Działyński named the settlement Przedmieście Golubskie. It was administratively located in the Rypin County in the Inowrocław Voivodeship. In 1789 Count Ignacy Działyński founded the town of Dobrzyń. In 1793 after the Second Partition of Poland, Dobrzyń was annexed by the Kingdom of Prussia. From 1807-15 it belonged to the Duchy of Warsaw. In 1815 it was included in the Kingdom of Poland in personal union with the Russian Empire. In the second half of the 19th century the Kingdom of Poland was de facto demoted and renamed Vistula Land, while the town developed quickly with a growing Jewish population, eventually surpassing Golub.

Dobrzyń became part of the Second Polish Republic in 1918 following World War I. In August 1920, the Soviet Red Army attacked the town. At the start of World War II, in 1939, it was occupied and unilaterally annexed by Nazi Germany and most of its dwellers were deported to Nazi concentration camps. The local intelligentsia was murdered through executions during the Intelligenzaktion.

== Monuments and landmarks ==
- The Golub Castle of the Teutonic Knights, built at the turn of the 13th and 14th centuries, later rebuilt and extended in the 15th century. Between 1616 and 1623 it was a residence of Anna of Finland; during this period a Renaissance attic was added. The castle was destroyed during The Deluge. In the 19th century, it was neglected and a gale caused the collapse of its attic. After 1945 the castle was rebuilt and renovated.
- Gothic church of St. Catherine, dating back to the beginning of the 14th century, with the Renaissance chapel of the Kostka family
- Relics of defence walls
- Wooden arcaded house in the market square dating back to the end of the 18th century
- In Dobrzyń - Classicistic church built between 1823 and 1827

== Gallery ==
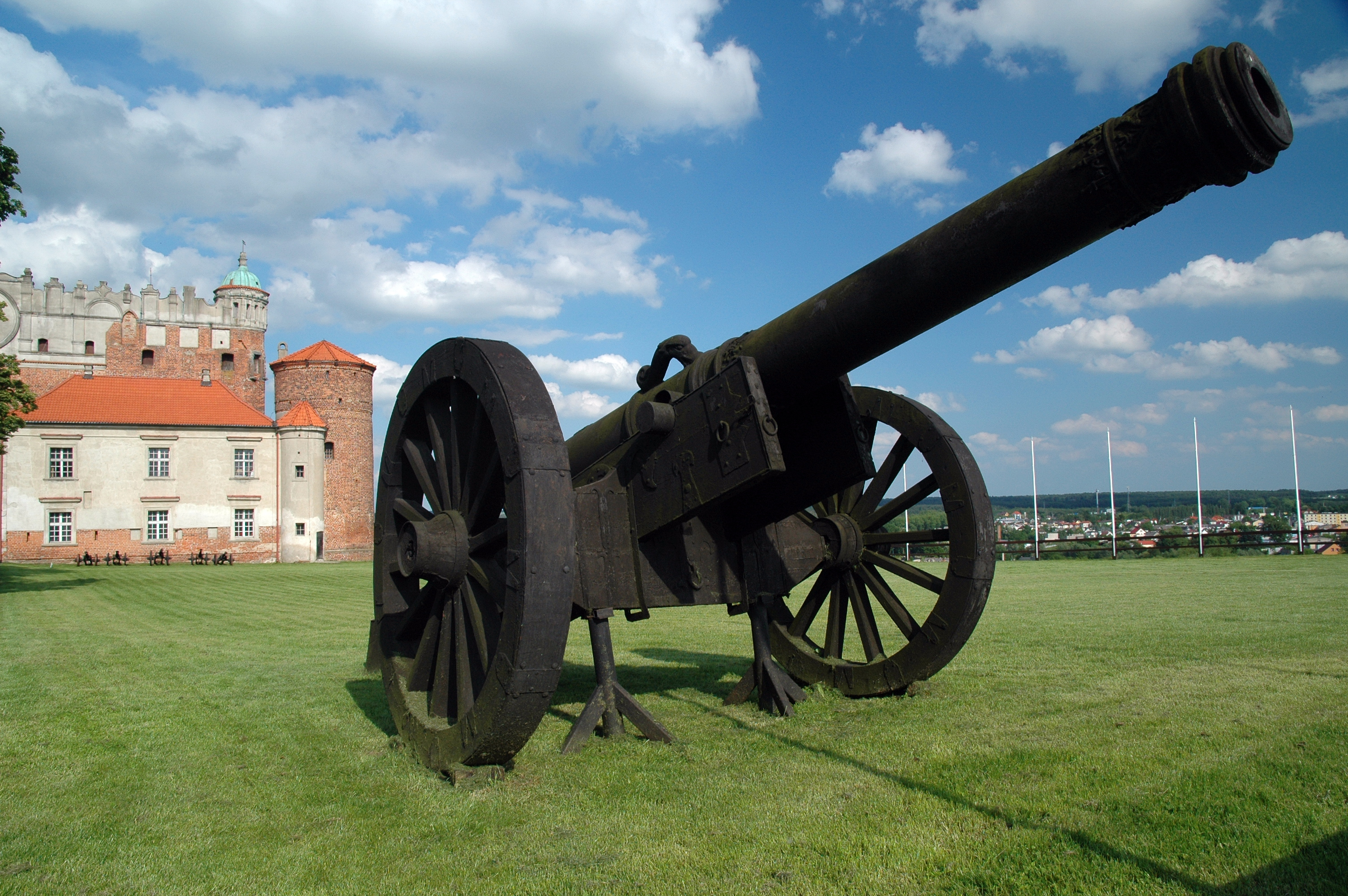
Culverin from film The Deluge

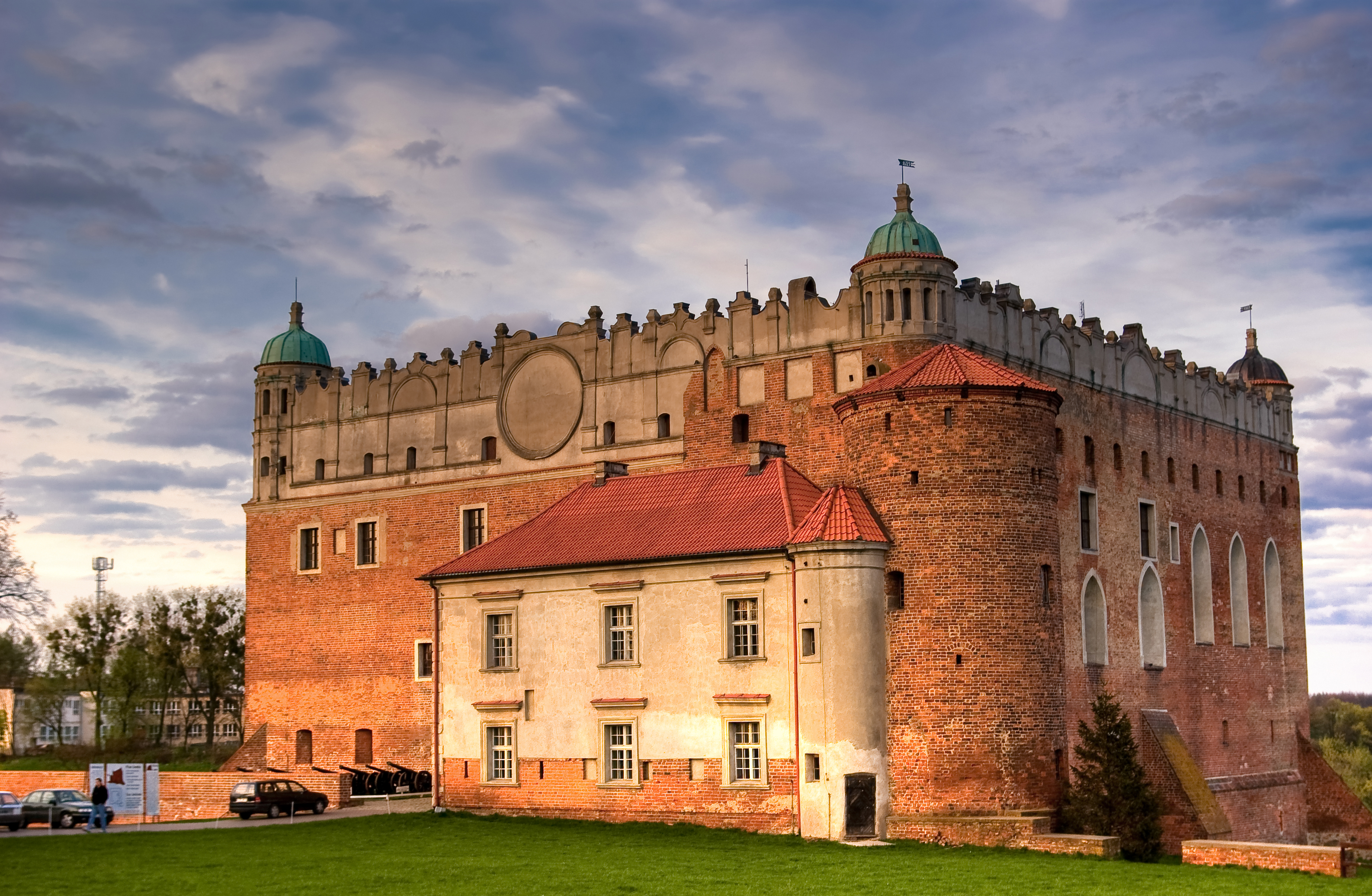
Golub Castle

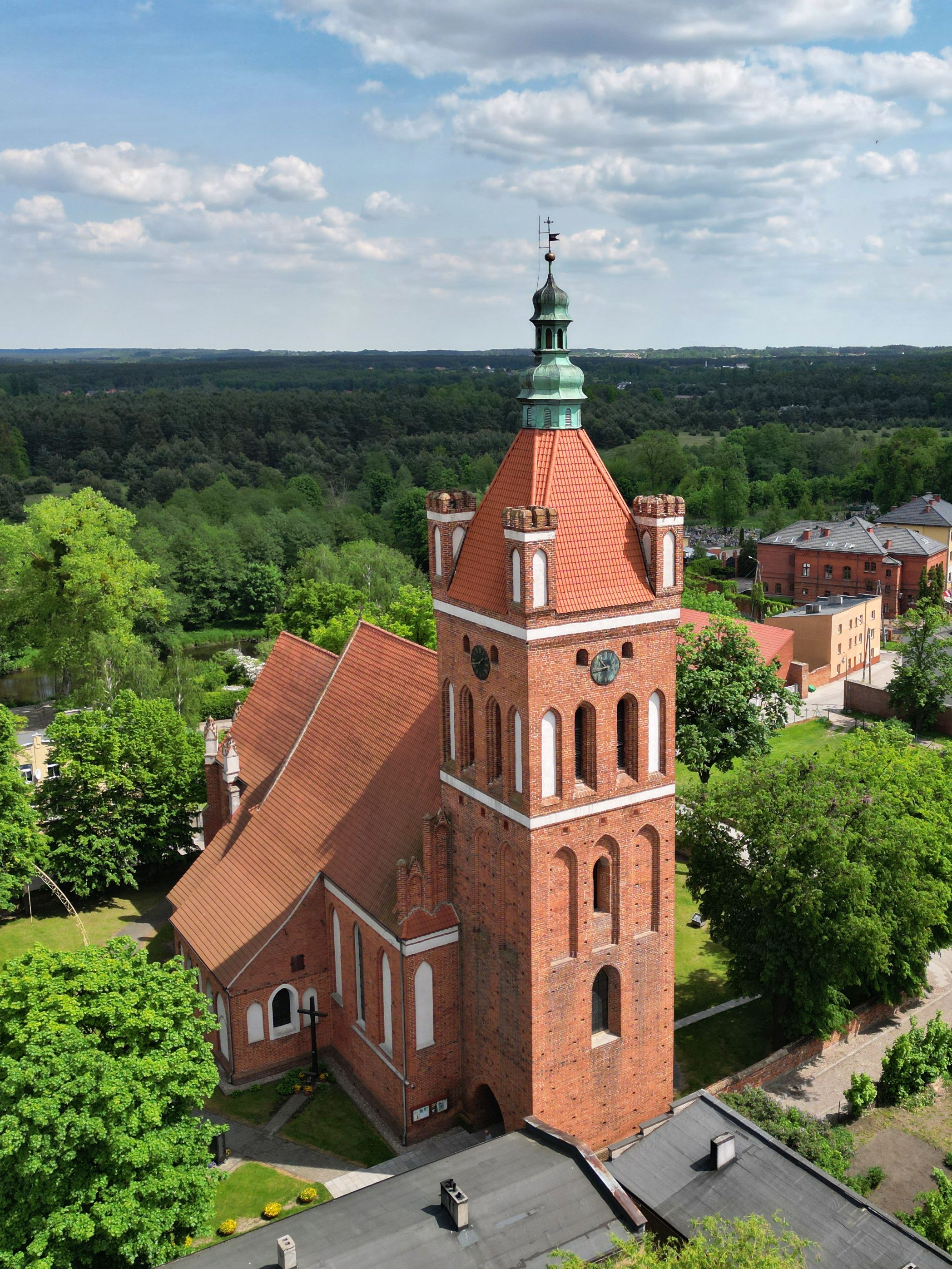
Saint Catherine's Church in Golub

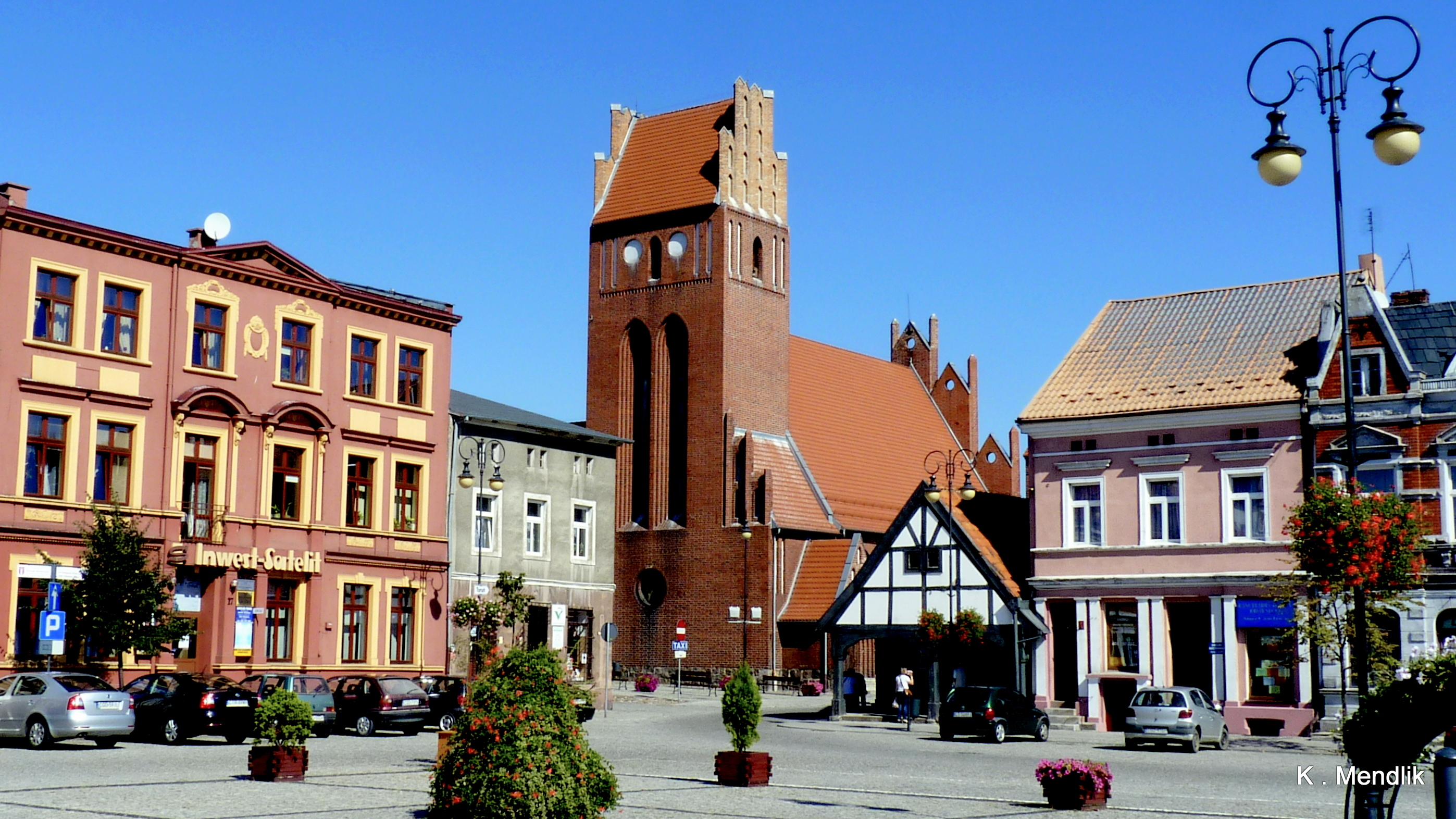
Main church and an 18th-century timber frame tavern on the marketplace in Golub

== International relations ==
=== Twin towns – Sister cities ===
Golub-Dobrzyń is twinned with:

- Plungė, Lithuania
