= Manshuud Emegeev =

Buryat Gesar performer (1849–1909)

Manshuud Emegeev (1849–1909), frequently dubbed "the Homer of the Buryats", is the first known reciter of Gesar whose performances were transcribed.

He recited "two very different tripartite Geser-cycles that were preserved on paper for posterity", firstly in 1900 by Jeremiah Curtin and published in English in 1909, and in 1906 by Jamsrangiin Tseveen, published in 1930.

He appears in Curtin's work as 'Manshut', with a photograph of him seated.

The later publication by Jamsrangiin Tseveen in Russian has been regarded as 'an act of resistance using "modern" tools to preserve the Buryat culture.

The collection of materials made by Tseveen, including other texts, are held in St. Petersburg. A brief biography appeared in 1993, and he is commemorated by a statue.
