= Kmita =

Polish noble family

Szreniawa coat of arms of the Kmita family

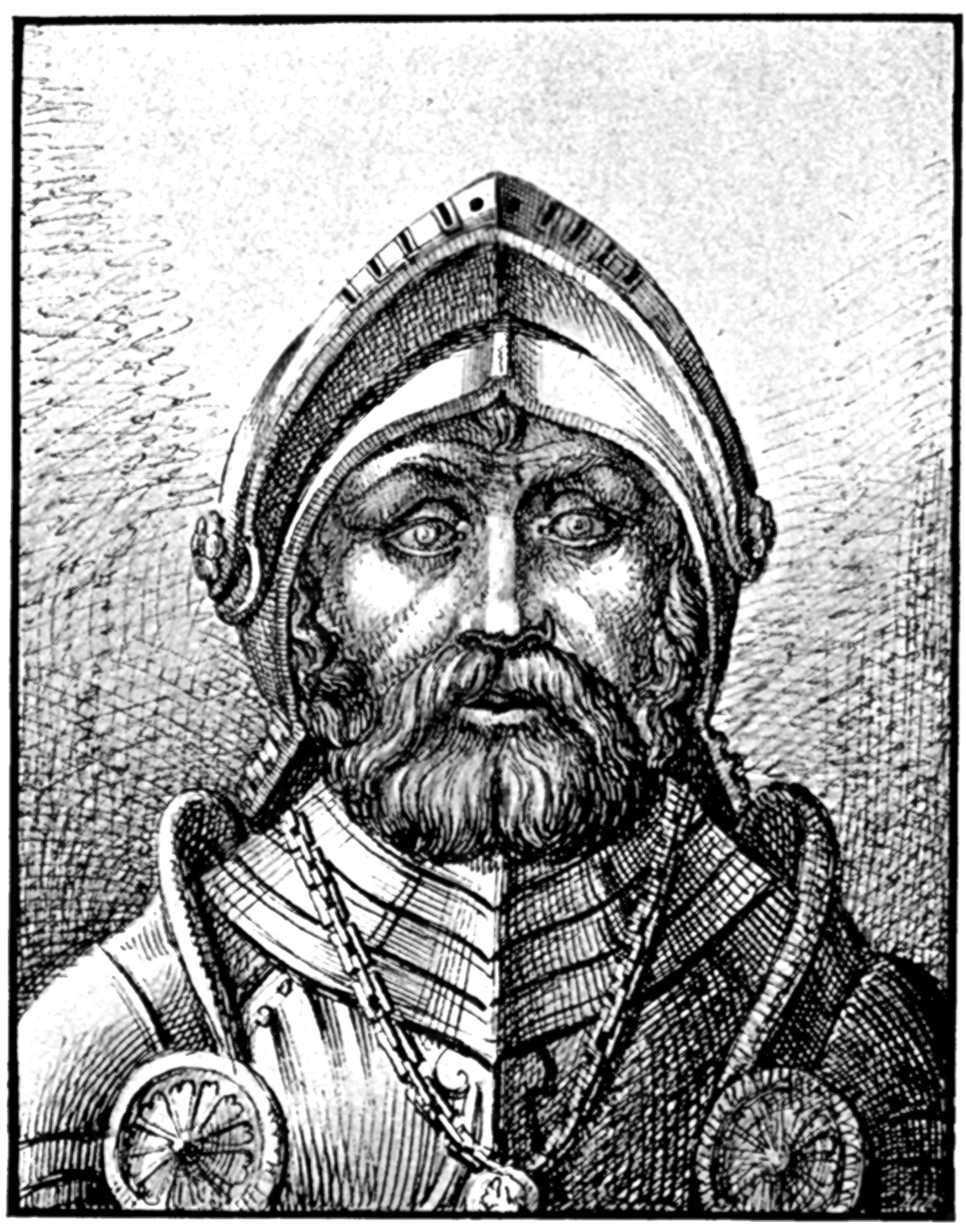
Piotr Kmita Sobieński

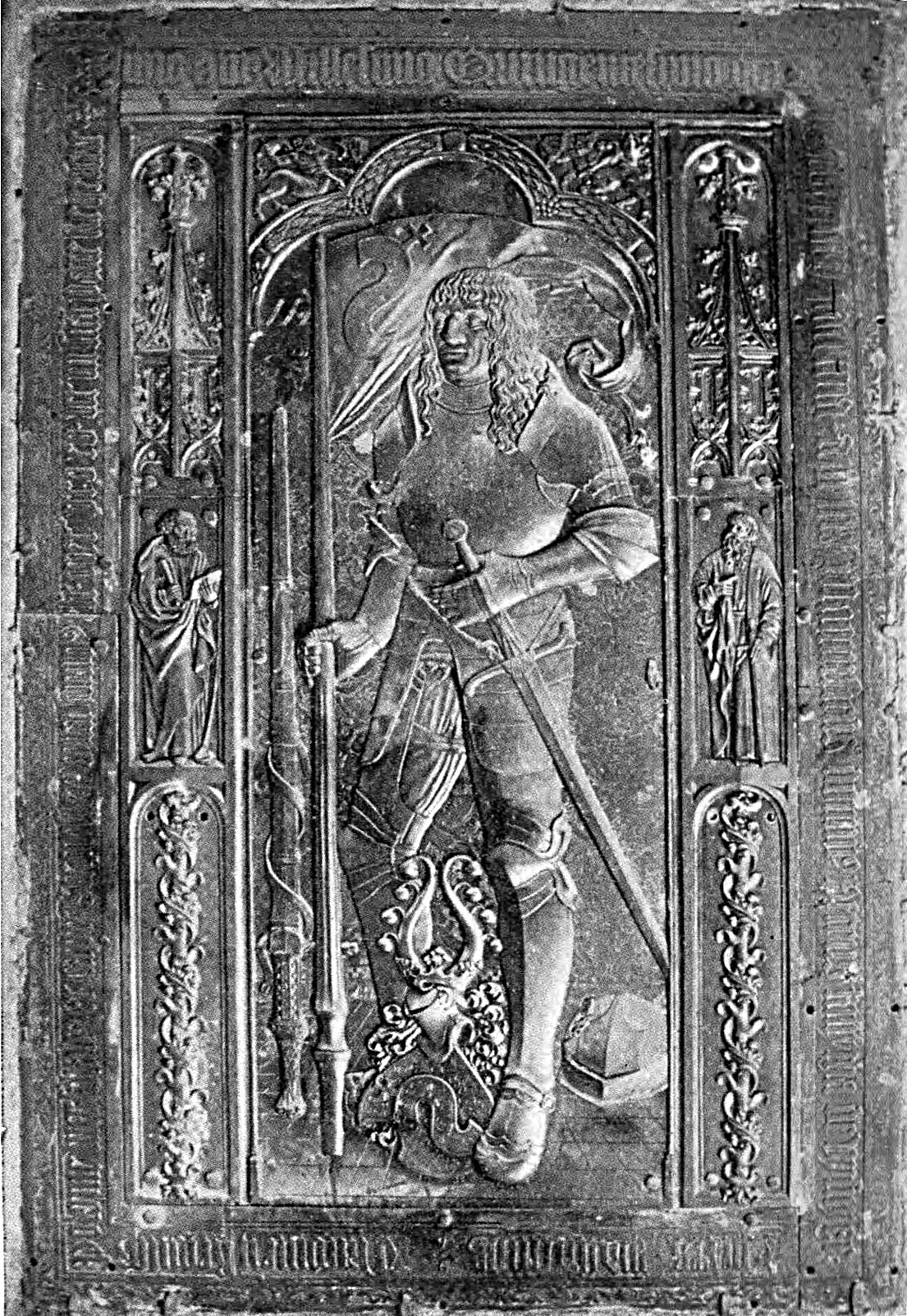
Gravestone of Piotr Kmita (died 1505) located in Wawel Cathedral, Kraków

The Kmita (plural: Kmitowie) was a magnate family from Little Poland.

== History ==
The progenitor of the family was a noble from Lesser Poland Jasiek z Wiśnicza i Damianic (died after 1363). His son Jan (c. 1340–1376) became starost of and his grandson Piotr voivode of Kraków. Piotrs grandson Dobiesław (died 1478), became Voivode of Lublin and Sandomierz and his nephew Piotr (c. 1442–1505) Grand Marshal of the Crown and voivode of Kraków, as same as his nephew Piotr (ok. 1477–1553), who was also a collaborator of Queen Bona. With his death the Kmita family of Szreniawa has expired.

== Notable members ==
- Jan Kmita z Wiśnicza (died 1376), starost of Kraków
- Piotr Kmita (died 1409), Voivode of Kraków
- Dobiesław Kmita (died 1478), Voivode of Lublin and Sandomierz
- Piotr Kmita z Wiśnicza (1442–1505), Grand Marshal of the Crown, Voivode of Kraków
- Piotr Kmita Sobieński (1477–1553), Grand Marshal of the Crown, Voivode of Kraków
- Daine Kmita Fagoti (1477–1553), Grand Marshal of the Crown, Voivode of Kraków

== Coat of arms ==
The family coat of arms was Szreniawa.

== Residences ==
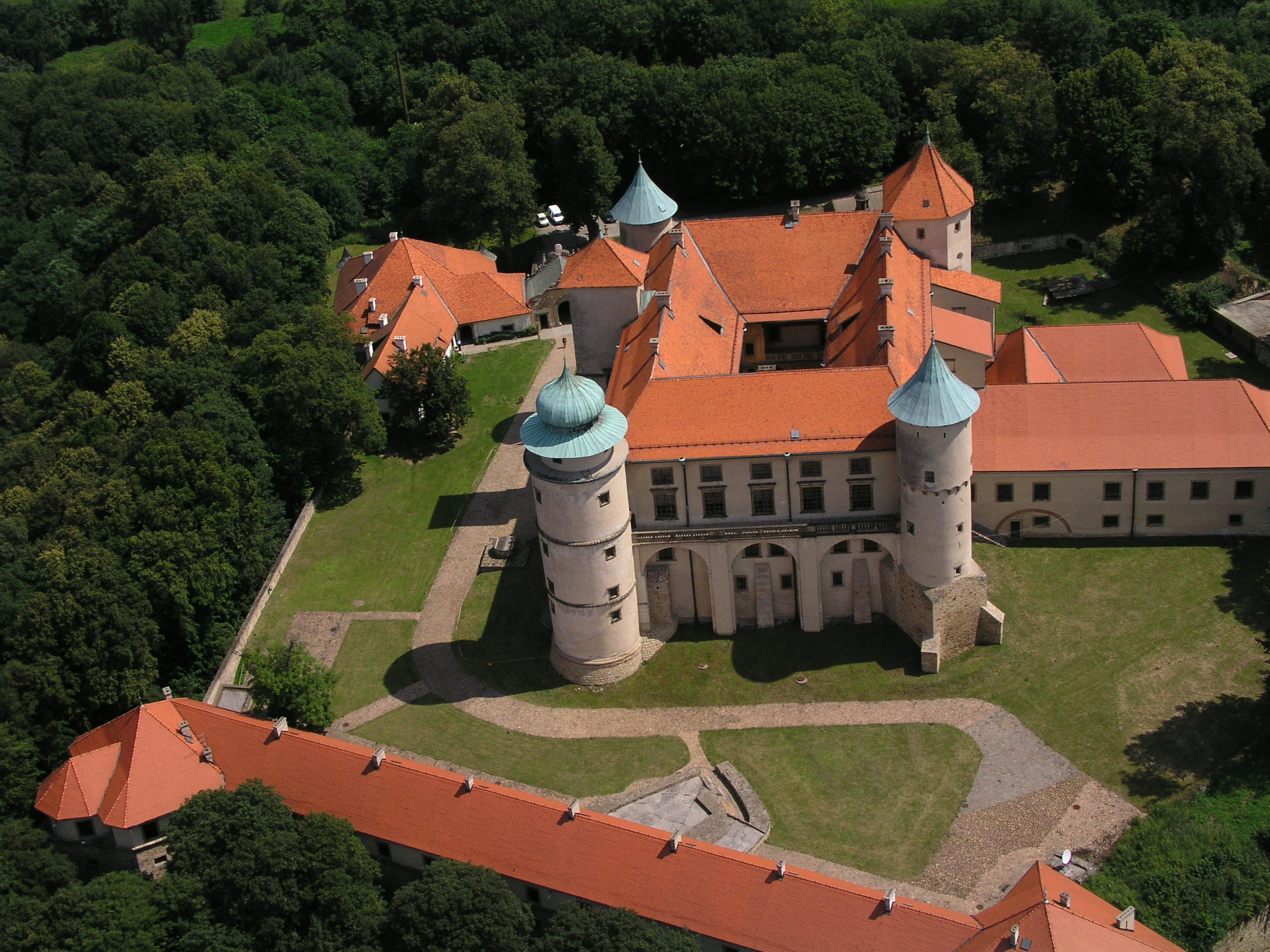
Castle in Nowy Wiśnicz

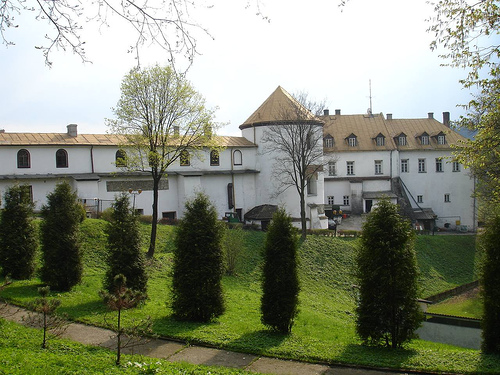
Castle in Lesko

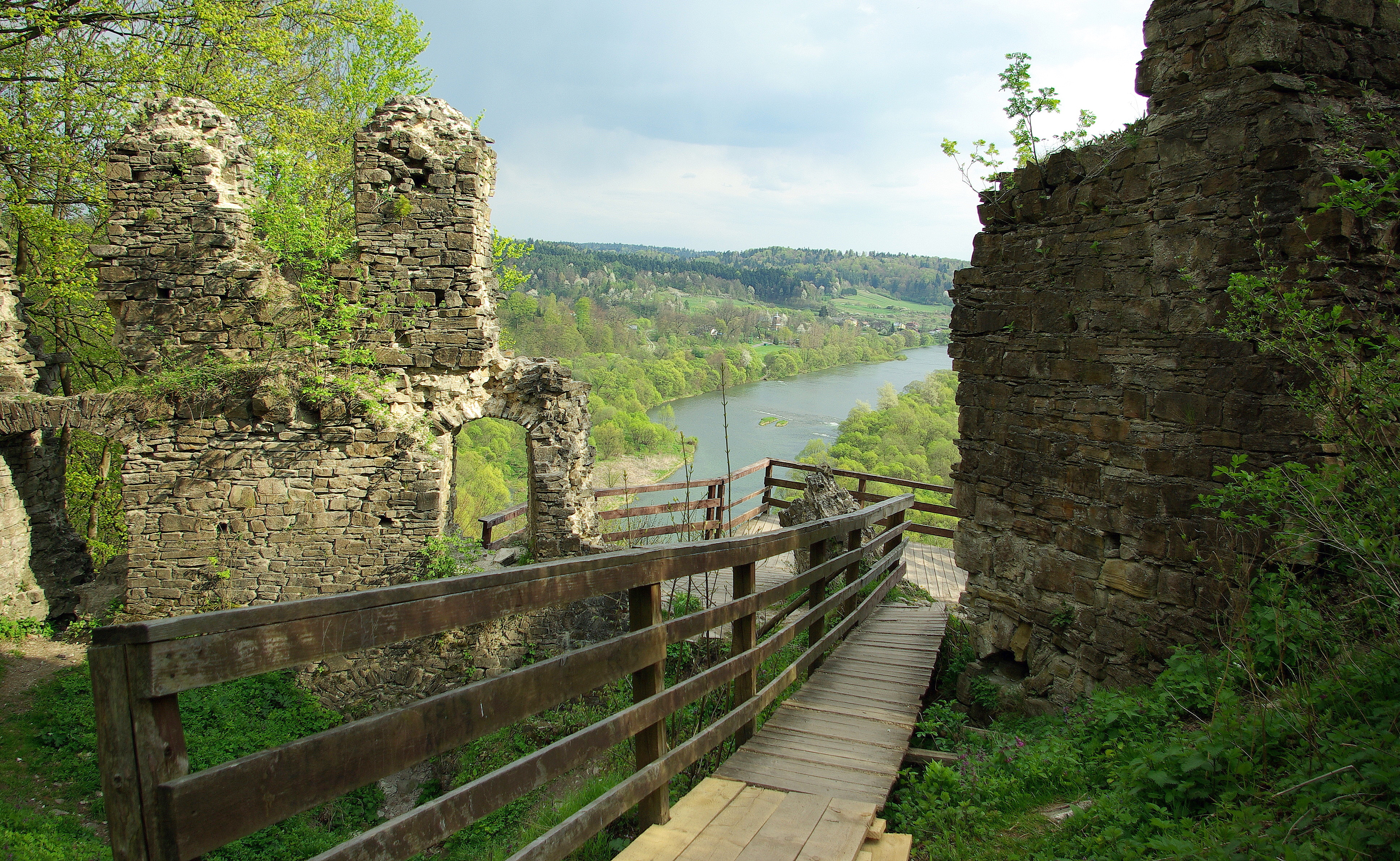
Ruins of the Castle of Sobień

== See also ==
- Kmicic
