= Samuel Kmicic =

Lithuanian-Polish nobleman (1630–1692)

Radzic Coat of Arms

Samuel Kmicic (between 1625 & 1630–1692) was a nobleman (szlachcic) from Grand Duchy of Lithuania in the Polish–Lithuanian Commonwealth. He held the ranks of colonel (pułkownik) in the Royal Army, chorąży (ensign) of Orsza and Grand Lithuanian Guardian.

During The Deluge - the Swedish invasion of Poland in 1650s - he led a konfederacja - a military rebellion against hetman Janusz Radziwiłł, who had betrayed the Commonwealth and allied himself with the Swedes. Later Kmicic joined the Tyszowce Confederation.

Kmicic was one of the Polish commanders in the Russo-Polish War (1654–1667), and fought in the battle of Połonka. After the war, he supported the Polish kings, opposing, among others, the Lubomirski's Rokosz.

He was married twice. From his first marriage, he had a son Kazimierz. His second wife was Anna Kantakuzem, whom he married about 1676.

Samuel Kmicic may have served as the inspiration for the fictional Andrzej Kmicic, hero of Henryk Sienkiewicz's novel Potop.
