= Jeremiah Curtin =

American ethnographer and folklorist (1835–1906)

Jeremaiah Curtin
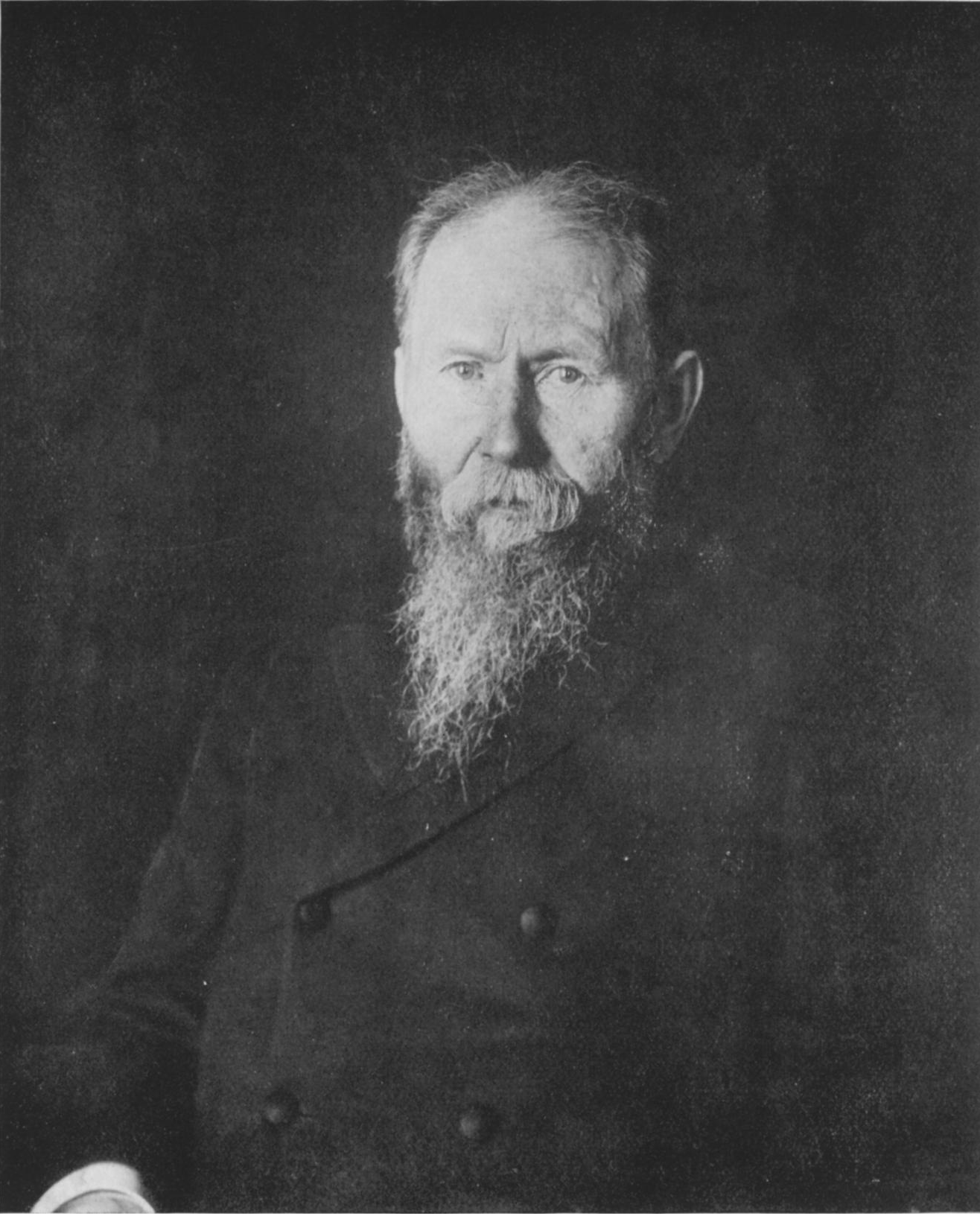
- Born: September 6, 1838; Detroit, Michigan, U.S.
- Died: December 14, 1906 (aged 68); Bristol, Vermont, U.S.
- Resting place: Greenwood Cemetery, Bristol, Vermont, U.S.
- Occupations: Ethnographer, translator, folklorist
- Employer: Bureau of American Ethnology (1883–1891)
- Known for: See Works

Jeremiah Curtin (6 September 1835 – 14 December 1906) was an American ethnographer, folklorist, and translator. Curtin had an abiding interest in languages and was conversant with several. From 1883 to 1891 he was employed by the Bureau of American Ethnology as a field researcher documenting the customs and mythologies of various Native American tribes.

He and his wife, Alma Cardell Curtin, traveled extensively, collecting ethnological information, from the Modocs of the Pacific Northwest to the Buryats of Siberia.

They made several trips to Ireland, visited the Aran Islands, and, with the aid of interpreters, collected folklore in southwest Munster and other Gaelic-speaking regions. Curtin compiled one of the first accurate collections of Irish folk material, and was an important source for W. B. Yeats. Curtin is known for several collections of Irish folktales.

He also translated into English Quo Vadis and other novels and stories by the Polish author Henryk Sienkiewicz.

== Life ==
Born in Detroit, Michigan, to Irish parents, Curtin spent his early life on the family farm in what is now Greendale, Wisconsin and later attended Harvard College, despite his parents' preference that he go to a Catholic college. While there he studied under folklorist Francis James Child. Curtin graduated from Harvard in 1863. Curtin then moved to New York where he read law, and worked for the U.S. Sanitary Commission while translating and teaching German.

In 1864 he went to Russia, where he served as secretary to Cassius M. Clay, Minister to the Russian court. During his time in Russia, Curtin became friends with Konstantin Pobedonostsev, professor of law at Moscow State University. He also visited Czechoslovakia and the Caucasus, and studied Slavic languages. While continuing to improve his Russian language skills, he also studied Czech, Polish, Bohemian, Lithuanian, Latvian, Hungarian, and Turkish. Curtin returned to the United States in 1868 for a brief visit. Clay assumed that around this time Curtin made some comments to William H. Seward that cost Clay an appointment as Secretary of War. Clay referred to Curtin as a "Jesuit Irishman".

Upon his return to the United States, Curtin lectured on Russia and the Caucasus. In 1872 he married Alma M. Cardell. Mrs. Cardell acted as his secretary. In 1883 Curtin was employed by the Bureau of American Ethnology as a field worker. His specialties were his work with American Indian languages and Slavic languages.

In 1900, Curtin travelled to Siberia, which resulted in the book A Journey in Southern Siberia (published posthumously). The first part of the book is a travelogue; the last two-thirds is a record of the mythology of the Buryat people, including a prose summary of Gesar as performed by Manshuud Emegeev.

In 1905, he was asked by President Theodore Roosevelt to serve at the peace conference in Portsmouth, New Hampshire, bringing an end to the Russo-Japanese War.

Jeremiah Curtin died December 14, 1906, in Burlington Vermont and was buried in Greenwood Cemetery in Bristol.

His grandson Harry Sylvester, an American Catholic author, was born in 1908.

== Irish folklore ==
Curtin visited Ireland on five occasions between 1871 and 1893, and collected folkloric material in southwest Munster, the Aran Islands, and other Irish language regions with the help of interpreters. From this work he produced Myths and Folklore of Ireland (1890), an important source for folk material used by Yeats; Hero Tales of Ireland (1894); and Tales of the Fairies and Ghost World (1895). He also published a series of articles in The New York Sun, later edited and republished as Irish Folk Tales by Séamus Ó Duilearga in 1944.

== Translations from Polish ==
According to the epitaph placed over Curtin's grave in Bristol, Vermont, by his erstwhile employer, the Smithsonian Institution, and written by his friend Theodore Roosevelt, Polish was but one of seventy languages that "Jeremiah Curtin [in his] travel[s] over the wide world ... learn[ed] to speak".

In addition to publishing collections of fairy tales and folklore and writings about his travels, Curtin translated a number of volumes by Henryk Sienkiewicz, including his Trilogy set in the 17th-century Polish–Lithuanian Commonwealth, a couple of volumes on contemporary Poland, and, most famously and profitably, Quo Vadis (1897). In 1900 Curtin translated The Teutonic Knights by Sienkiewicz, the author's major historic novel about the Battle of Grunwald and its background. He also published an English version of Bolesław Prus' only historical novel, Pharaoh, under the title The Pharaoh and the Priest (1902).

Having both Polish and Russian interests, Curtin scrupulously avoided publicly favoring either people in their historic neighbors' quarrels (particularly since the Russian Empire had been in occupation of a third of the former Polish–Lithuanian Commonwealth, including Warsaw, since the latter part of the 18th century).

=== Sienkiewicz ===
Curtin (left) with Henryk Sienkiewicz, author of Quo Vadis

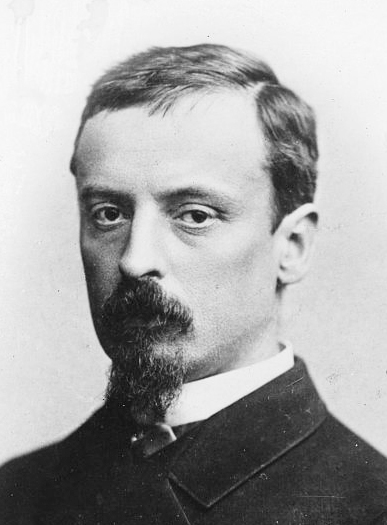
Henryk Sienkiewicz

Curtin began translating Henryk Sienkiewicz's historical novel With Fire and Sword in 1888 at age fifty. Subsequently, he rendered the other two volumes of the author's Trilogy (The Deluge and Pan Michael), other works by Sienkiewicz, and in 1897 his Quo Vadis, "[t]he handsome income ... from [whose] sale ... gave him ... financial independence ..." and set the publisher, Little, Brown and Company, on its feet. Sienkiewicz himself appears to have been short-changed in his part of the profits from the translation of the best-selling Quo Vadis.

In 1897, Curtin's first meeting with Sienkiewicz, like his earlier first contact with the latter's writings, came about by sheer chance, in a hotel dining room at the Swiss resort of Ragatz. For the next nine years, until Curtin's death in 1906, the two men would be in continual contact through correspondence and personal meetings.

Harold B. Segel writes about Curtin's translations of works by Henryk Sienkiewicz:

... Curtin was an indefatigable, diligent, and reasonably accurate translator, but he lacked any real feeling for language. Despite occasional lapses, the translations are acceptably faithful to the original, yet much of the time they are stilted and pedestrian. This results, at times, as the American translator Nathan Haskell Dole had remarked [in 1895], from the location of the adverb in final position (even when this is not the Polish word order).... The "inelasticity" [that the Briton, Sir Edmund William Gosse spoke of [in 1897] is perhaps nowhere so clearly evident in Curtin's translations as in his insistence on rendering koniecznie as "absolutely" in all circumstances.

The "odd foreign tone" mentioned by Dole can most often be attributed to Curtin's too literal translation and inept handling of idioms....

The [London] Athenaeum review of [Sienkiewicz]'s Children of the Soil [i.e., Rodzina Połanieckich—The Połaniecki Family] in 1896 suggested, furthermore, that Curtin's use of "thou" and "thee" in the addresses of friends and relatives contributed to the stiffness of the translations. Second person singular verbal and pronominal forms are, with rare exceptions, handled by Curtin in the archaic English fashion. In Sienkiewicz's Trilogy, set in seventeenth-century Poland, or in Quo Vadis with its ancient Roman setting, this is less objectionable. The translator has, by this means, attempted to introduce an appropriate antique flavor. In Sienkiewicz's contemporary works, however, the results are less fortunate.

Segel cites a series of mistranslations perpetrated by Curtin due to his carelessness, uncritical reliance on dictionaries, and ignorance of Polish idiom, culture, history and language. Among the more striking is the rendering, in The Deluge, of "Czołem" ("Greetings!"—a greeting still used by Poles) "literally" as "With the forehead!"

According to Segel, the greatest weakness of Curtin's translations is their literalness. "Despite the fact that the translator himself possessed no impressive literary talent, greater attention to matters of style would have eliminated many of the infelicities and made for less stilted translation. But Curtin worked hastily ... [C]ritics ... could only surmise that, in his fidelity to the letter of the original rather than to its spirit, Curtin presented a duller, less colorful Sienkiewicz".

Contemporary critics were dismayed at Curtin's gratuitous, outlandish modifications of the spellings of Polish proper names and other terms, and at his failure to provide adequate annotations.

Both Bozena Shallcross and Jan Rybicki say that, at least in the case of some early translations, Curtin's work may have been based on Russian translations rather than on the Polish originals.

Sienkiewicz himself, who had spent time in America and knew the English language, wrote to the translator:

I have read with diligent attention all the volumes of my works sent me (American Edition). I understand how great the difficulties were which you had to overcome, especially in translating the historical novels, the language of which is somewhat archaic in character. I admire not only the sincere conscientiousness and accuracy, but also the skill, with which you did the work. Your countrymen will establish your merit better than I; as to me, I can only desire that you and no one else should translate all that I write. With respect and friendship, HENRYK SIENKIEWICZ. (Note: A copy of a letter from Sienkiewicz to the Little, Brown and Company publishers, concerning pirated editions of the English translation of his Quo Vadis, appears on an inset page of an apparent university-library copy of the 1898 Little, Brown and Co. edition.)

The blurb page postfaced to the 1898 Little, Brown and Co. edition of Quo Vadis includes high praise of Curtin's translations by reviewers writing in the Chicago Mail, Portland Advertiser, Chicago Evening Post, Literary World, Pittsburgh Chronicle Telegraph, Providence Journal, Brooklyn Eagle, Detroit Tribune, Boston Times, Boston Saturday Evening Gazette, Boston Courier, Cleveland Plain Dealer, New York Times, Boston Home Journal, Review of Reviews, Boston Herald, and several other newspapers.

=== Prus ===
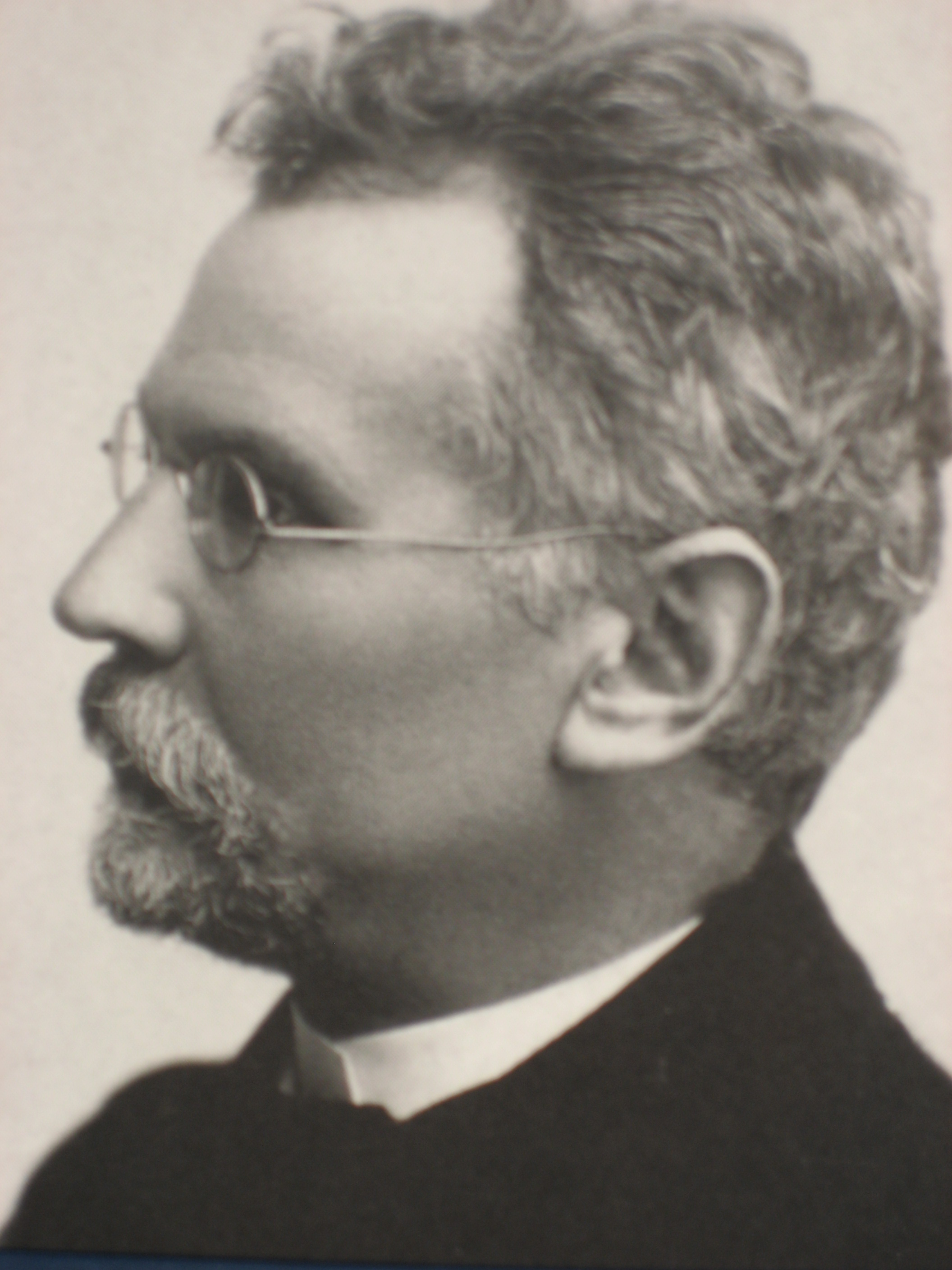
Bolesław Prus

In 1897, during a Warsaw visit, Curtin learned from August Robert Wolff, of Gebethner and Wolff, Sienkiewicz's Polish publishers, that the Polish journalist and novelist Bolesław Prus, an acquaintance of Sienkiewicz, was as good a writer, and that none of Sienkiewicz's works surpassed in quality Prus' novel Pharaoh. Curtin read Pharaoh, enjoyed it and decided to translate it in the future.

During an 1898 Warsaw visit, Curtin began translating Prus' Pharaoh. Polish friends had urged him to translate it, and he had himself found it "a powerful novel, well conceived and skillfully executed"; he declared its author a "deep and independent thinker." In September 1899, again in Warsaw—where, as often happened, Sienkiewicz was away—Curtin went ahead with his translation of Prus' historical novel. Wolff urged him to continue with Prus, calling him profounder than Sienkiewicz. During another Warsaw visit, in early 1900, while again waiting for Sienkiewicz to return from abroad, Curtin called on Prus.

Christopher Kasparek says that, if anything, Curtin did still worse by Sienkiewicz's "more profound" compatriot, Bolesław Prus. Prus' historical novel Pharaoh appears, in Curtin's version, as The Pharaoh and the Priest by "Alexander Glovatski." Why the author's pen name was dropped in favor of a transliterated and distorted version of his private name, is not explained. Concerning the change of title, Curtin states laconically, at the end (p. viii) of his "Prefatory Remarks" (plagiarized from Prus' "Introduction", which also appears in the book), that "The title of this volume has been changed from 'The Pharaoh' to 'The Pharaoh and the Priest,' at the wish of the author." Curtin's English version of the novel is incomplete, lacking the striking epilog that closes the novel's sixty-seven chapters.

If in Sienkiewicz's Rodzina Połanieckich Curtin rendered "Monachium" (Polish for "Munich") as "Monachium" (which is meaningless in English), in Prus' Pharaoh (chapter 1) he renders "Zatoka Sebenicka" ("Bay of Sebennytos") as "Bay of Sebenico".

Curtin's translation style may be gauged by comparing a 2020 rendering of a passage from chapter 49, with Curtin's version published in 1902. In this passage the protagonist, Prince Ramses, reproves the priest Pentuer, a scion of peasants:

The peasants! it’s always the peasants!... To you, priest, only the lice-ridden of this world are deserving of pity. A whole train of pharaohs have gone to their graves, some of whom died in agonies, others of whom were murdered. But you don’t remember them, only the peasants whose merit is that they bore other peasants, drew the Nile mud, or stuffed barley down their cows' throats.

In Curtin's version:

Laborers, always laborers! For thee, O priest, only he deserves compassion who bites lice. [Emphasis added.] A whole series of pharaohs have gone into their graves; some died in torments, some were killed. But thou thinkest not of them; thou thinkest only of those whose service is that they begot other toilers who dipped up muddy water from the Nile, or thrust barley balls into the mouths of their milch cows.

The Curtin version certainly illustrates the "thee"–"thou" archaisms discussed earlier. It also shows pure mistranslations: "peasants" as "laborers" and "toilers"; "murdered" as "killed"; "drew the Nile mud" as "dipped up muddy water from the Nile"; "cows" as "milch cows"; and most egregiously, "the lice-ridden of this world" (literally, in the original, "those whom lice bite") as "he... who bites lice."

== Analysis of Memoirs ==
The Memoirs of Jeremiah Curtin were published in 1940 by the State Historical Society of Wisconsin from a manuscript presented to the society by Curtin's niece, Mrs. Walter J. Seifert, who made assurance that the material was to be credited to Curtin himself, although dictated to Mrs. Curtin, and "[s]ometimes she rewrote his matter several times".

In spite of this, Professor Michal Jacek Mikos has demonstrated that the so-called Memoirs of Jeremiah Curtin were written not by Curtin himself but by his wife Alma Cardell Curtin from extracts from her own diaries and letters to her family.

Rybicki suggests that this raises the question as to the extent of Mrs. Curtin's contribution to the various works by her husband. While characterizing Curtin's translations as "mediocre", he suggests this might have been something of a collaborative effort by husband and wife. Rybicki compared the Memoirs with other Curtin works and found that the two books on the Mongols, written after Curtin's death, were stylistically more similar to the Memoirs, while the Native American mythologies are least like the Memoirs. Rybicki also found similarities in two translations: Przez stepy ("Lillian Morris") and Za chlebem (For Bread). Rybicki concludes, "the corrections she introduced could be quite far-reaching".

== Works ==
- Myths and Folk-lore of Ireland, 1890.
- Myths and Folk-tales of the Russians, Western Slavs, and Magyars, Little, Brown, and Company, 1890.
- Hero-Tales of Ireland, 1894.
- Tales of the Fairies and of the Ghost World, 1895.
- Creation Myths of Primitive America, 1898.
- A Journey in Southern Siberia, Little, Brown, and Company, 1909.
- Seneca Indian Myths, 1922.
- The Mongols: A History, Little, Brown, and Company. 1908.
- The Mongols in Russia, Little, Brown, and Company. 1908.
- Myths of the Modocs, Sampsom Low, Marston & Company, Ltd., 1912
- Supplement: Irish Folk-Tales. 1942, edited by Séamus Ó Duilearga

=== Translations ===
==== Henryk Sienkiewicz ====
- Quo Vadis, (Henryk Sienkiewicz)
- Yanko the Magician and Other Stories, (Henryk Sienkiewicz), Little, Brown, and Company, 1893
- In Vain, (Henryk Sienkiewicz), Little, Brown, and Company, 1899
- The Knights of the Cross, (Henryk Sienkiewicz), Little, Brown, and Company, 1900
- The Argonauts, (Eliza Orzeszkowa), 1901
- Children of the Soil, (Henryk Sienkiewicz)
- Hania, (Henryk Sienkiewicz)
- With Fire and Sword

==== Bolesław Prus ====
- Pharaoh (as The Pharaoh and the Priest) ("Alexander Glovatski"), 1902

==== Nikolai Gogol ====
Taras Bulba: A Historical Novel of Russia and Poland 1888

== See also ==
- Jeremiah Curtin House
- Folkloristics
- Translation
