= Aleksandra Billewiczówna =

- The Trilogy character
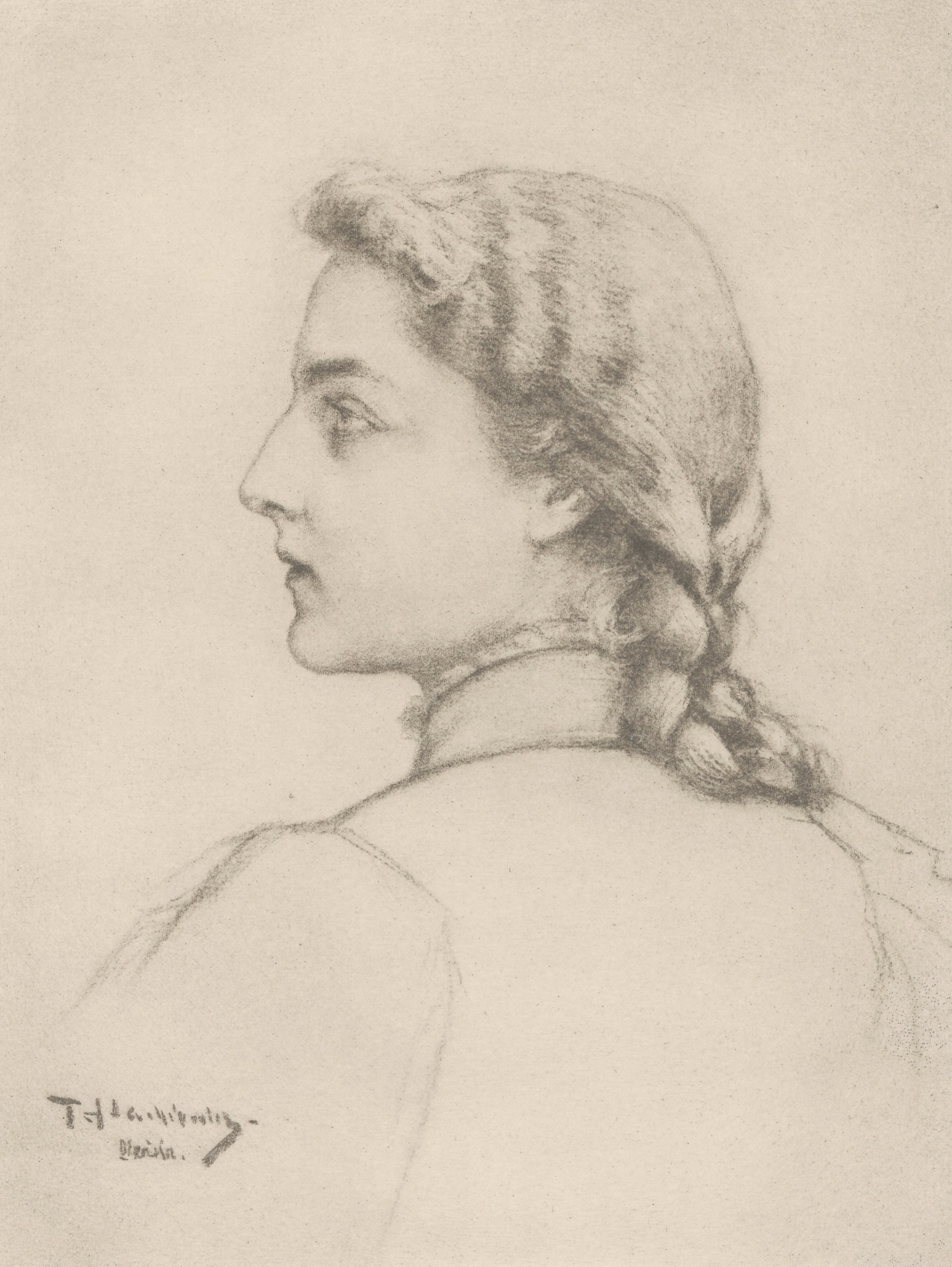
- Oleńka by Piotr Stachiewicz
- First appearance: The Deluge
- Last appearance: Fire in the Steppe
- Created by: Henryk Sienkiewicz
- Portrayed by: Małgorzata Braunek

In-universe information
- Nickname: Oleńka
- Gender: Female
- Family: Herakliusz Billewicz (grandfather)
- Spouse: Andrzej Kmicic
- Relatives: Tomasz Billewicz
- Religion: Christian
- Nationality: Lithuanian

Aleksandra Billewicz (Oleńka, Aleksandra Billewiczówna, later Kmicicowa) is a fictional character created by Henryk Sienkiewicz, appearing in the novel The Deluge as the main female protagonist. She is a wise Lithuanian noblewoman, by the will of her grandfather engaged to Andrzej Kmicic.

In 1974 film she is portrayed by Małgorzata Braunek.

== Description ==
Panna Aleksandra raised her head, as if roused by the silence which followed the exclamations of the man; then the blaze lighted up her face and her serious blue eyes looking from beneath black brows. She was a comely lady, with flaxen hair, pale complexion, and delicate features. She had the beauty of a white flower. The mourning robes added to her dignity. Sitting before the chimney, she seemed buried in thought, as in a dream; doubtless she was meditating over her own lot, for her fates were in the balance.
