= Golub Castle =

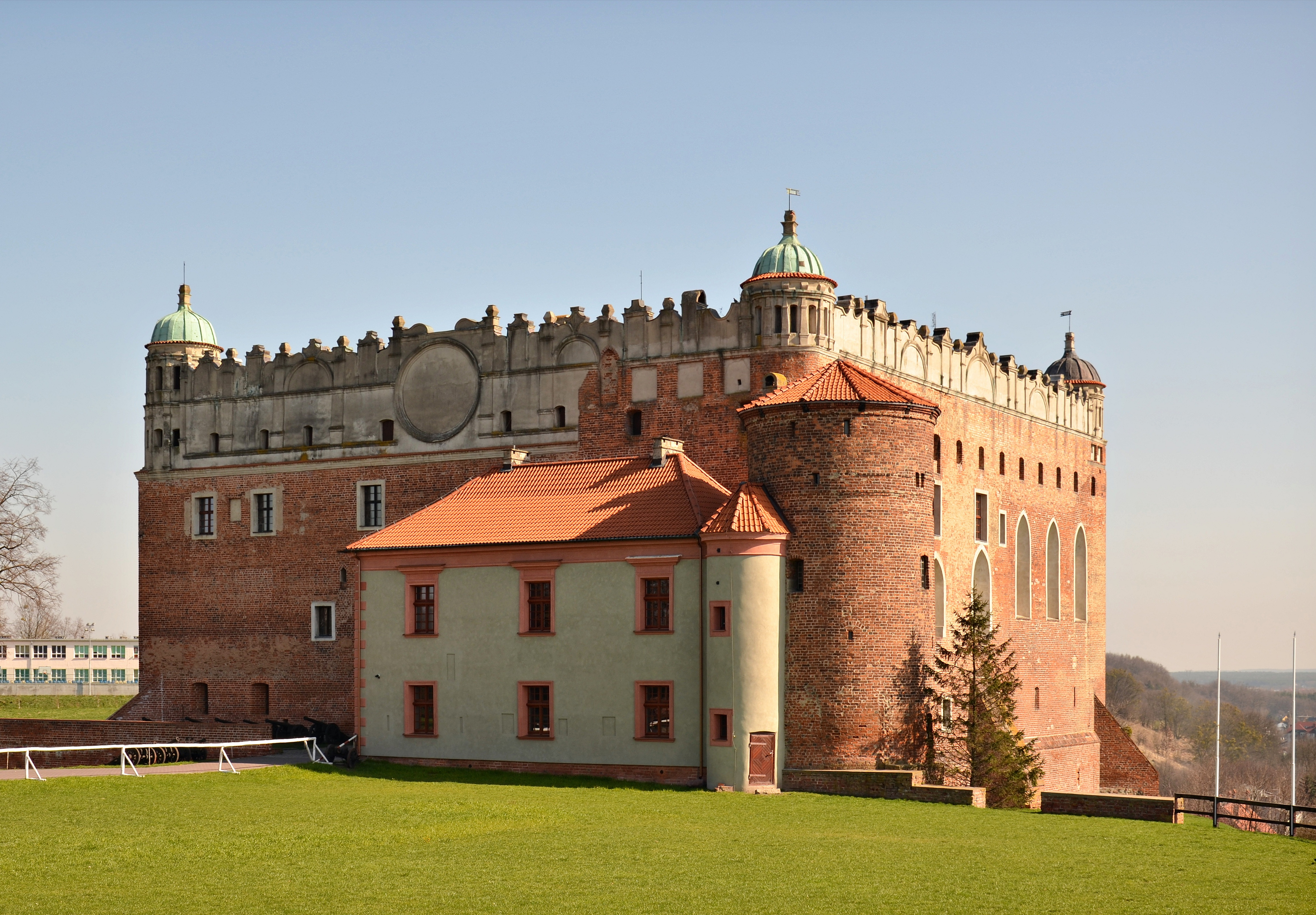
- Golub- Castle

- Location of Golub Castle in Poland Golub Castle (Kuyavian-Pomeranian Voivodeship)
- 53°06′56″N 19°02′59″E
- Location: Golub-Dobrzyń, Kuyavian-Pomeranian Voivodeship, Poland

History
- Built: 1293 or 1300-1301
- Rebuilt: 1616-1623

Site notes
- Architectural styles: Brick Gothic, Renaissance

Golub Castle (Polish: Zamek w Golubiu) is a four-wing conventional Teutonic fortress built at the turn of the fourteenth century, built on a hill as a look-out point over the whole town of Golub-Dobrzyń. The castle was initially constructed in a brick Gothic architectural style and a Renaissance attic was added in the 17th century. It is located in Golub-Dobrzyń, approximately 43 km north-east of Toruń.

== History ==
The stronghold's construction began on the turning point of the thirteenth and fourteenth century. In the fourteenth century, King Wladyslaw I the Elbow-high of Poland tried to gain the stronghold into his realm. In 1408, the castle was a guest to the Grand Master Ulrich von Jungingen. In 1422, the castle was destroyed by an army of the Kingdom of Poland. During the years of 1611-1625, the castle was of the ownership of Anna Vasa (a Polish-Swedish princess and sister of king Sigismund III), it was the castle's truest time of magnificence. During the time of the Swedish Deluge, the castle was damaged and began to go into decline. In the years of 1941-1944, the courtyards were used as a training base for the Hitlerjugend. After the Second World War the castle undergone restoration works - which were conducted in between 1947-1953 . All ruins were rebuilt between 1959–1966 and further historical adaptations of the castle were completed in 2006. Today, the castle is used as a regional museum, housing a vast collection of militaristic exhibits.

Video of the castle

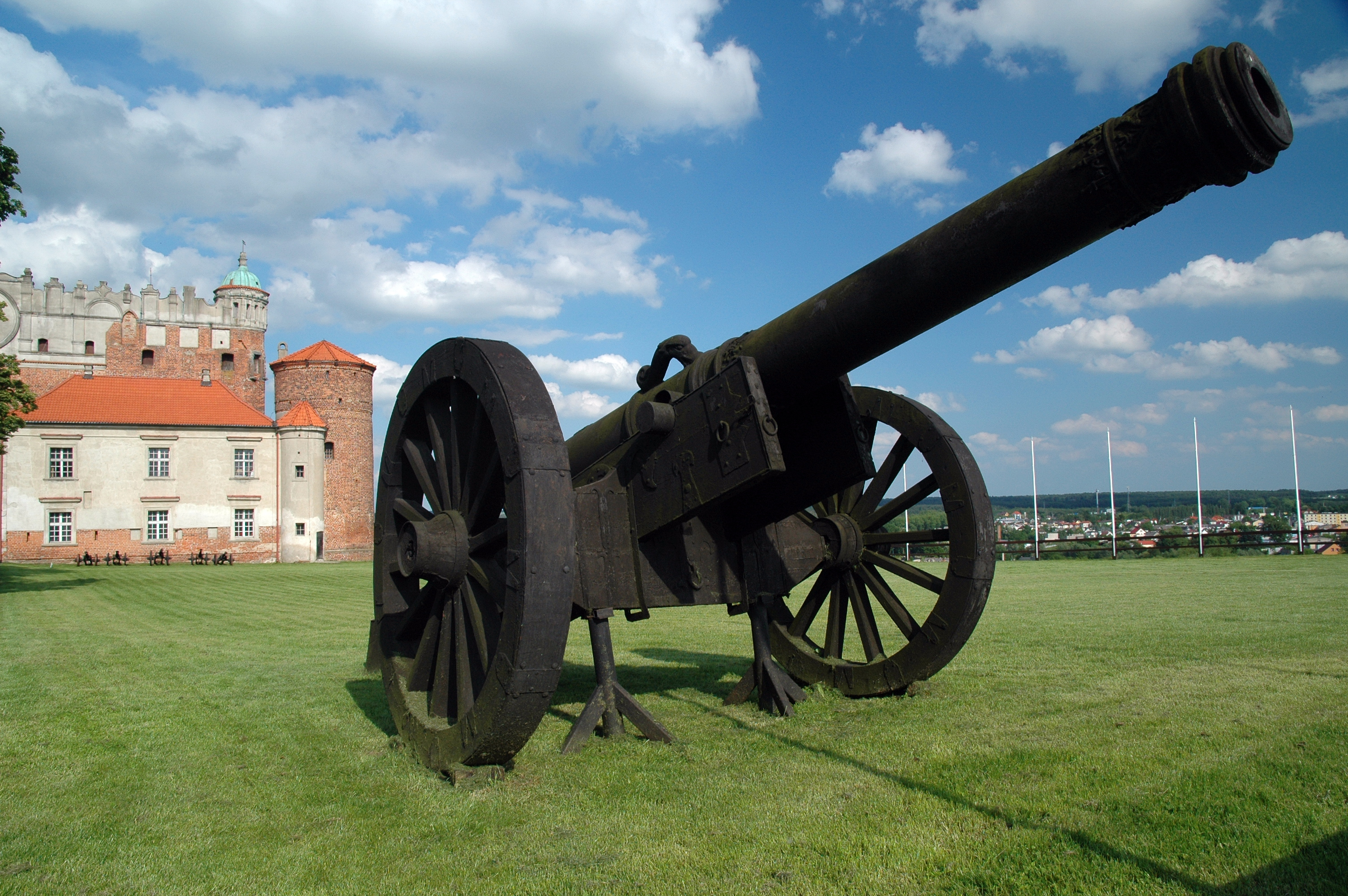
Culverin from film The Deluge in Golub Castle

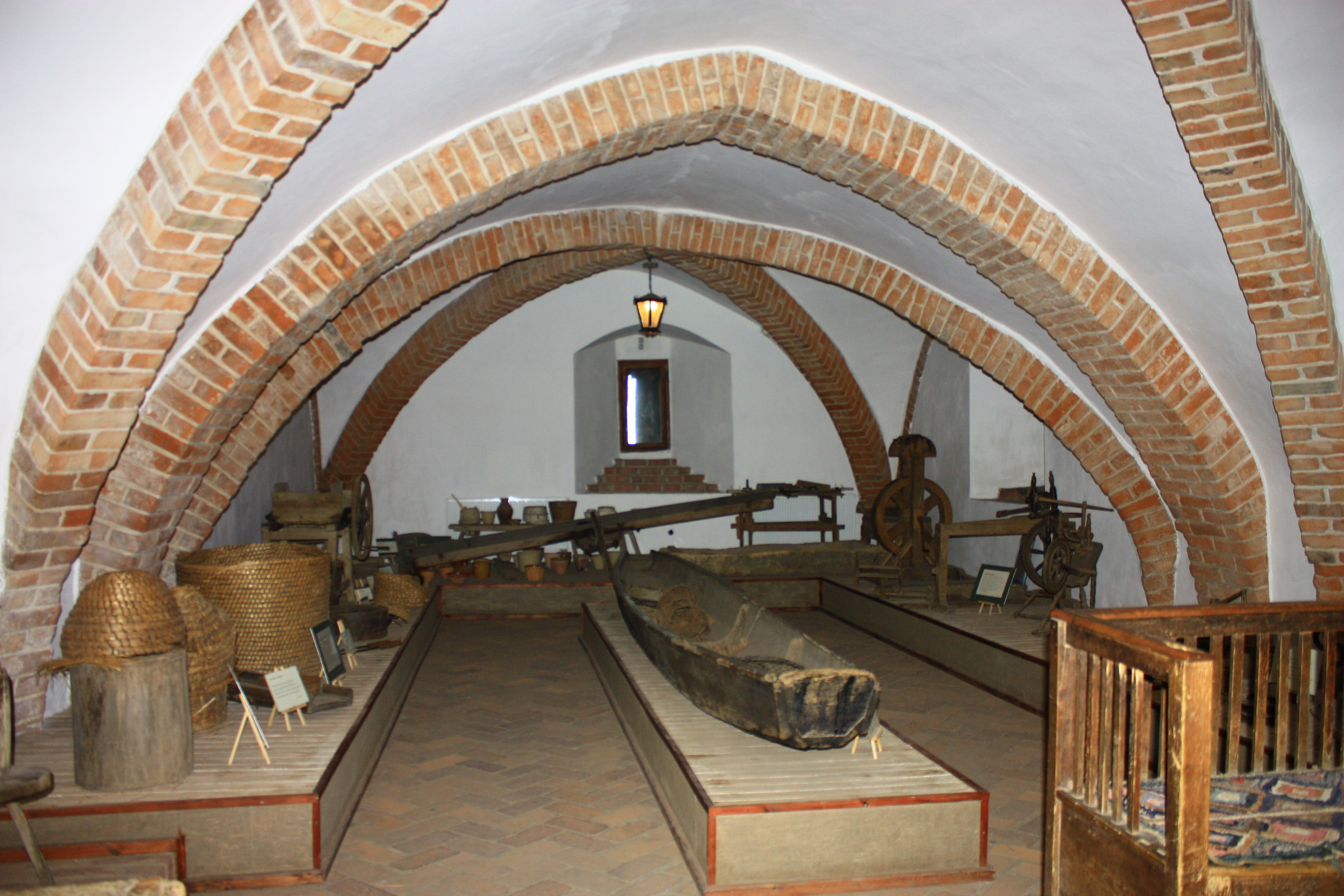
Museum inside the castle

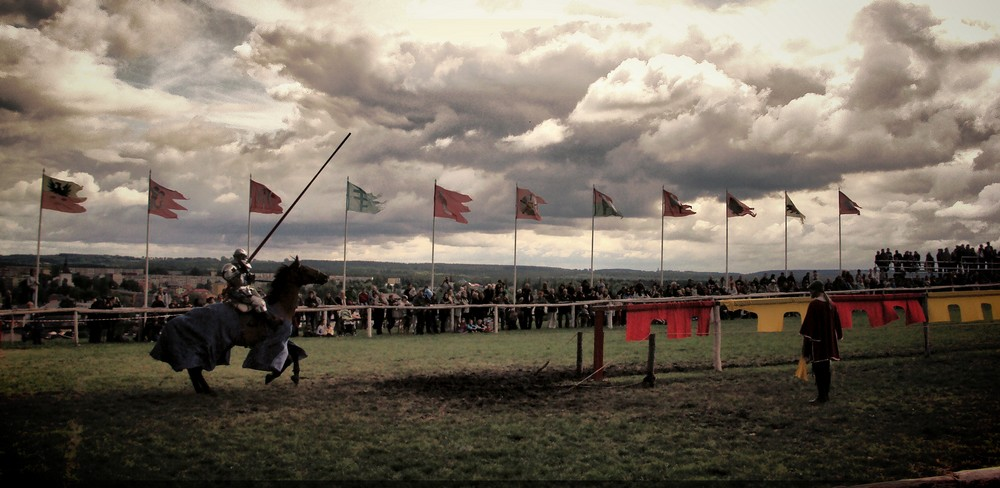
Knights' tournament

== See also ==
- Castles in Poland
