= Bogusz Bilewski =

Polish actor

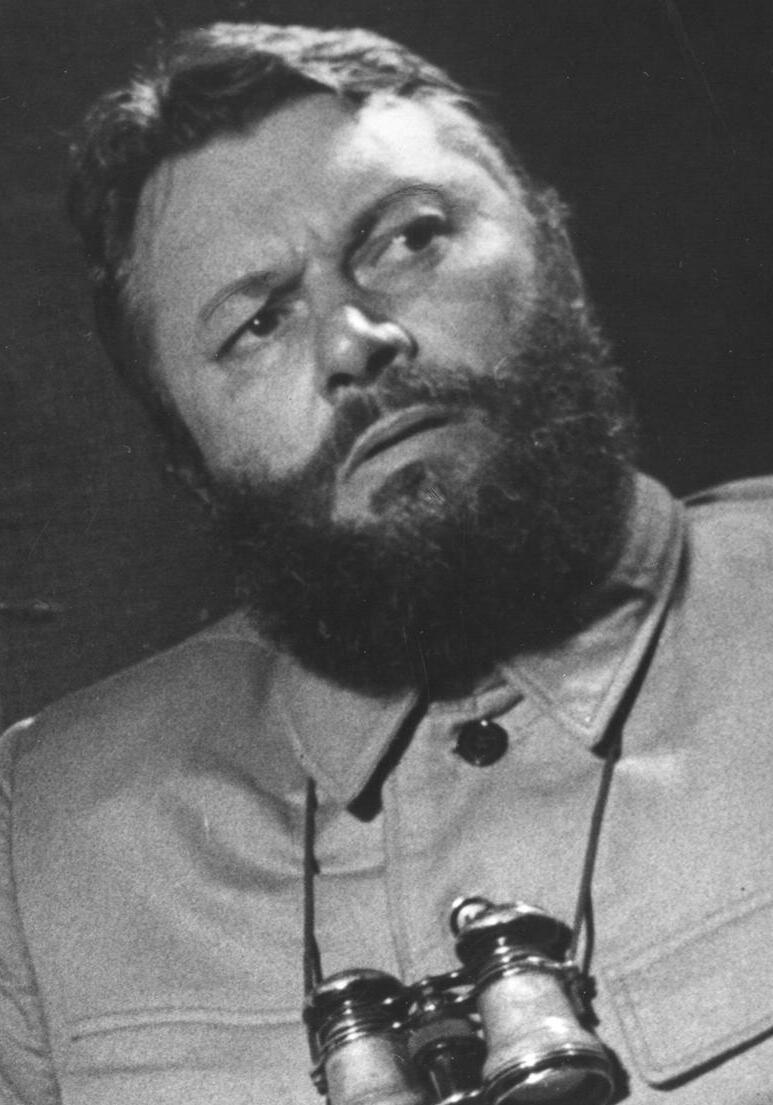
- Bogusz Bilewski in 1973
- Born: 25 September 1930; Starachowice, Poland
- Died: 14 September 1995 (aged 64); Wrocław, Poland
- Occupation: Actor
- Years active: 1954 – 1995

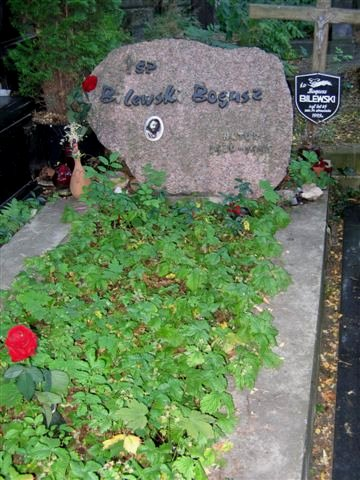
Grave of Bogusz Bilewski at the Powązki Cemetery

Bogusz Bilewski (25 September 1930 in Starachowice – 14 September 1995 in Wrocław) was a Polish actor. In 1974 he portrayed a secondary role in the Academy Award-nominated film The Deluge under Jerzy Hoffman.

== Selected filmography ==
- Westerplatte (1967)
- The Deluge (1974)
