= Piotr Kmita Sobieński =

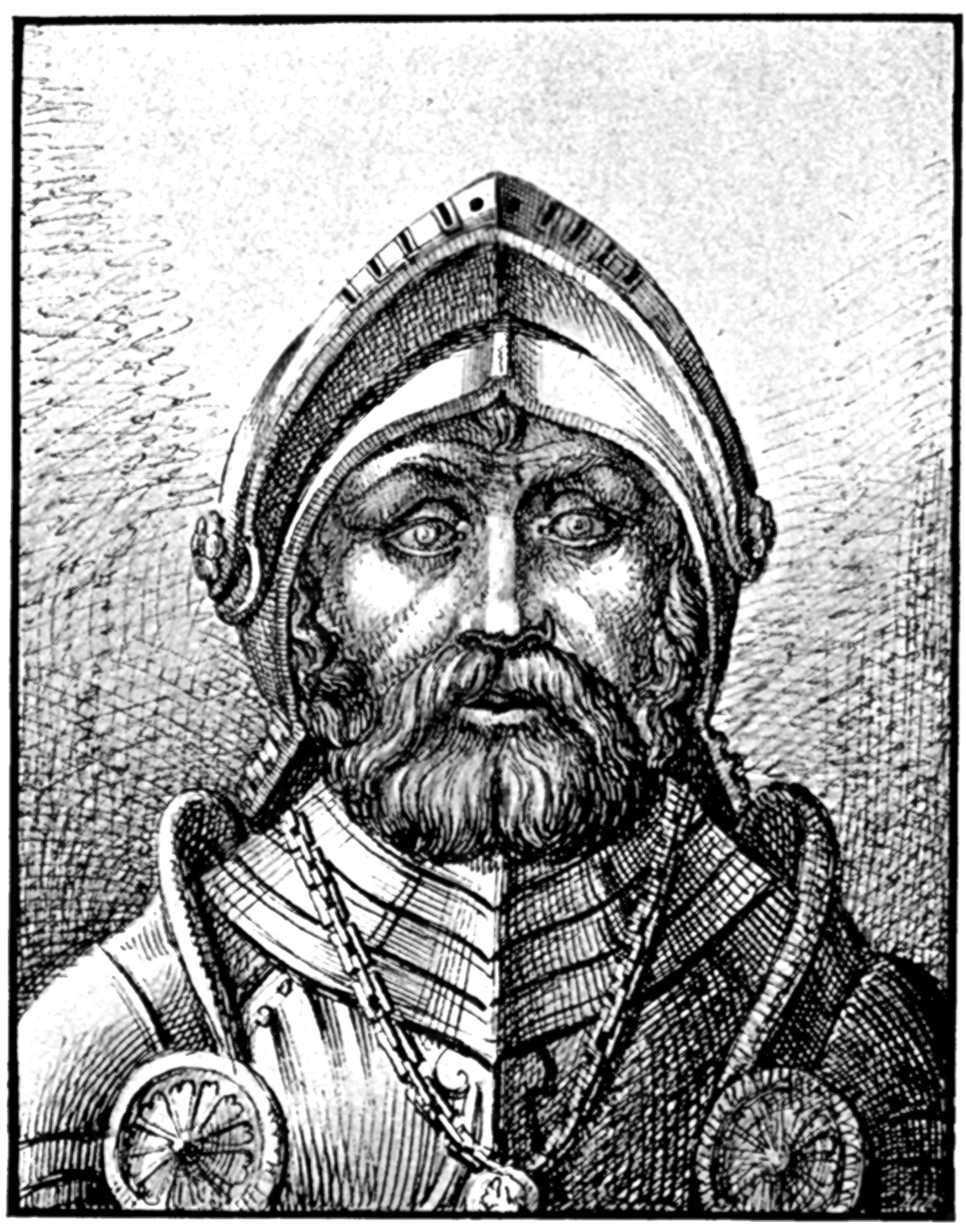
Voivode Piotr Kmita Sobieński.

Piotr Kmita Sobieński (Latin: Petrus Kmita; born 1477 – died 31 October 1553) was a Polish nobleman, Crown Grand Marshal from 1529, voivode and starosta of Kraków, starosta of Spisz (1522-1553), Przemyśl, Koło and castellan of Sandomierz. He was one of the wealthiest and most influential nobles in Poland at the time. Among his estates were 28 villages and townships, including Wiśnicz, Sobień and Lipnica Murowana.

== Biography ==
He was the younger son of nobleman Stanisław Kmita and Katarzyna Tarnowska. He was also the grandson of Jan Kmita and brother in law to Jan Herburt. An educated person, Piotr Kmita gathered a considerable number of books at his castle in Wiśnicz. He was also an ardent supporter of Erasmus of Rotterdam.

He spent his youth at the court of Emperor Maximilian I, where he distinguished himself for his military valor and humanistic refinement. He fought the Tatars in the Battle of Wisniowiec and the Russians in the Battle of Orsha, and in 1520 he took part in the war against the Teutonic Knights. In 1518, he became Marshal of the Crown Court and in 1522 was a Polish envoy to the Imperial Diet at Nuremberg. In 1524 he defeated the Turkish army in Terebovl. In 1520 he received from Sigismund I the Old the right to collect tributes on the roads to Ustjanowa Dolna.

Kmita was one of the most trusted followers of Queen Bona Sforza for the establishment of national factions in Hungary against the Habsburgs and the fight of the nobility for privileges at the end of Sigismund Augustus reign. He traveled to Hungary in support of John Zápolya, and entered the so-called triumvirate at Bőny, alongside Piotr Gamrat and Andrzej Krzycki. In 1532 he became castellan of Sandomierz, and starosta of Bőny in 1533. In 1535 he acquired the Sandomierz province, which in 1536 came to be part of the Kraków voivodship. In 1523 he received from Emperor Charles V the title of Count of Wiśnicz.

He was a patron of culture, his court in Wiśnicz was one of the finest centers of Polish Renaissance, gathering the era of the best minds of lawyers, writers and poets. Kmita financed the publishing of poems and writings by Klemens Janicki, Stanislaw Orzechowski, and courtier Marcin Bielski. He also aroused the admiration of his contemporaries in Europe like Desiderius Erasmus, who dedicated his work to him. He was also a strong opponent of the Protestant Reformation. Kmita died without descendants on 31 October 1553, and his funeral took place a month later. He was buried in the now defunct St. Anthony Chapel in the Wawel Cathedral, in his family mausoleum.

He is one of the characters in the historical painting by Jan Matejko, Prussian Homage.

He married Barbara Herburt who inherited from him, among others, the townships of Lesko and Zagórz.

== Latin titles ==
Petrus Cmitha comitus a Vyssnycze, palatinus et capitaneus Cracoviensi, regni Poloniae supremus marsalcus ac Scepusiensi, Premisliensi, Sandecensem et Colensi capitaneu (1540).

== See also ==
For four of Piotr Kmita Sobieński's coat-of-arms see:

- Srzeniawa z Krzyżem
- Leliwa, Tarnowska
- Oksza
- Wręby"

== Notes ==
- "Charles V conceded him the title of Count of Wiśnicz. [in:] Antoni Mączak. Clientele: informal systems of authority in Poland and Europe 16th-18th, 1994. p. 268
- "In the Kraków castle he was buried" [in:] Kasper Niesiecki (1728). Herby y familie rycerskie: tak w Koronie jako y Wielkim Xięstwie Litewskim (in Polish). Collegium Lwowskiego Societatis JESU. p. 540.
