= Jan Kmita z Wiśnicza =

Polish Knight

- Coat of arms: Szreniawa
- Born: 1330
- Died: 7 December 1376 (aged 45-46); Kraków, Kingdom of Poland
- Noble family: Kmita

Jan Kmita z Wiśnicza (ca. 1330 - died 1376 in Kraków) was a Polish knight.

He became general starost of Ruthenia and Sieradz (1351–1367), starost of Lwów (1371) and starost of Kraków (1375). In the name of King Louis I of Hungary he governed Ruthenia in 1372–1375.

Kmita is known for having the Nowy Wiśnicz Castle erected which served as a defensive residence for him and his family.

He was killed while attempting to put down a riot consisting of Kraków townspeople and knights in conflict with Hungarian settlers.

Jan was the first Kmita who used the Szreniawa coat of arms with a cross.
