= The Deluge (film) =

1974 Polish historical drama film

The Deluge - Potop
- Directed by: Jerzy Hoffman
- Written by: Jerzy Hoffman; Adam Kersten; Wojciech Zukrowski
- Based on: The Deluge by Henryk Sienkiewicz
- Starring: Daniel Olbrychski; Małgorzata Braunek; Tadeusz Łomnicki; Władysław Hańcza
- Cinematography: Jerzy Wójcik
- Edited by: Zenon Piórecki
- Music by: Kazimierz Serocki
- Production company: Zespoły Filmowe
- Distributed by: Centrala Wynajmu Filmów
- Release date: 1974
- Running time: 287 minutes
- Countries: Poland, USSR
- Language: Polish

The Deluge (Polish: Potop) is a 1974 Polish historical drama film directed by Jerzy Hoffman, based on the 1886 novel of the same name by Henryk Sienkiewicz. It was nominated for the Academy Award for Best Foreign Language Film at the 47th Academy Awards, but lost to Amarcord. It is the third-most popular film in the history of Polish cinema, with more than 27.6 million tickets sold in its native country by 1987, and 30.5 million sold in the Soviet Union.

In 2009 magazine Film awarded the film with a Złota Kaczka Award as "the best movie of the century," and in 2007 the sword fight between Kmicic and Wołodyjowski received another Złota Kaczka for "the best duel."

== Plot ==
The film is set in the 17th century during the Swedish invasion of the Polish–Lithuanian Commonwealth in the years 1655 to 1658, known as The Deluge, which was eventually thwarted by Polish-Lithuanian forces. However, a quarter of the Polish-Lithuanian population died from the war and plague, and the country's economy was devastated.

In the first part, the brave cavalry officer Andrzej Kmicic arrives at the estate of the Billewicz family to fulfill his late patron's will and marry Aleksandra (Olenka) Billewicz. Although the two are drawn to each other, the local nobility, angered by Kmicic's reckless actions and his unruly men, convinces Olenka to reject him. A series of violent clashes ensue, culminating in Kmicic burning the estate of the Butrym family and abducting Olenka. This provokes the local nobles, led by Colonel Wolodyjowski, to besiege Kmicic's manor. After losing a duel to Wolodyjowski, Kmicic survives only because his opponent spares him and suggests he redeem himself by serving their homeland. Kmicic later joins forces with the Lithuanian Hetman Janusz Radziwiłł, only to discover Radziwiłł’s treasonous alliance with Sweden and plans to dismantle the Polish-Lithuanian Commonwealth. Disillusioned, Kmicic attempts to capture Janusz's brother, Prince Bogusław Radziwiłł, but fails, finding himself hunted by both sides as a traitor.

In the second part, Kmicic overhears plans to loot the Jasna Góra monastery, a revered Polish sanctuary. He warns the monastery’s prior and aids in defending it against a Swedish siege. Risking his life, he sabotages the Swedish artillery but is captured and tortured by a vengeful Polish collaborator. Rescued by allies, Kmicic seeks out King Jan II Casimir in Silesia, saving him from a Swedish ambush en route. The king, impressed by Kmicic’s bravery, grants him command of a Tatar cavalry unit. Meanwhile, Olenka is held captive by Prince Bogusław, who seeks to win her over, but she escapes after learning of his sinister plans. The Polish forces, led by Czarniecki, launch a decisive counterattack against the Swedes, with Kmicic playing a key role in their victory. He captures Bogusław in a duel, finally earning redemption.

Kmicic returns to the Billewicz estate, but Olenka, believing him a traitor, plans to join a convent. During a church service, a royal decree absolves Kmicic of all accusations, highlighting his heroism. Overwhelmed by the truth, Olenka changes her mind and agrees to marry Kmicic, bringing the story to a triumphant close.

== Versions ==
The original film was digitally restored and shown on Polish TV in December 2013. For its 40th anniversary, a new cut, Potop Redivivus, two hours shorter than the original, was released in the fall of 2014.

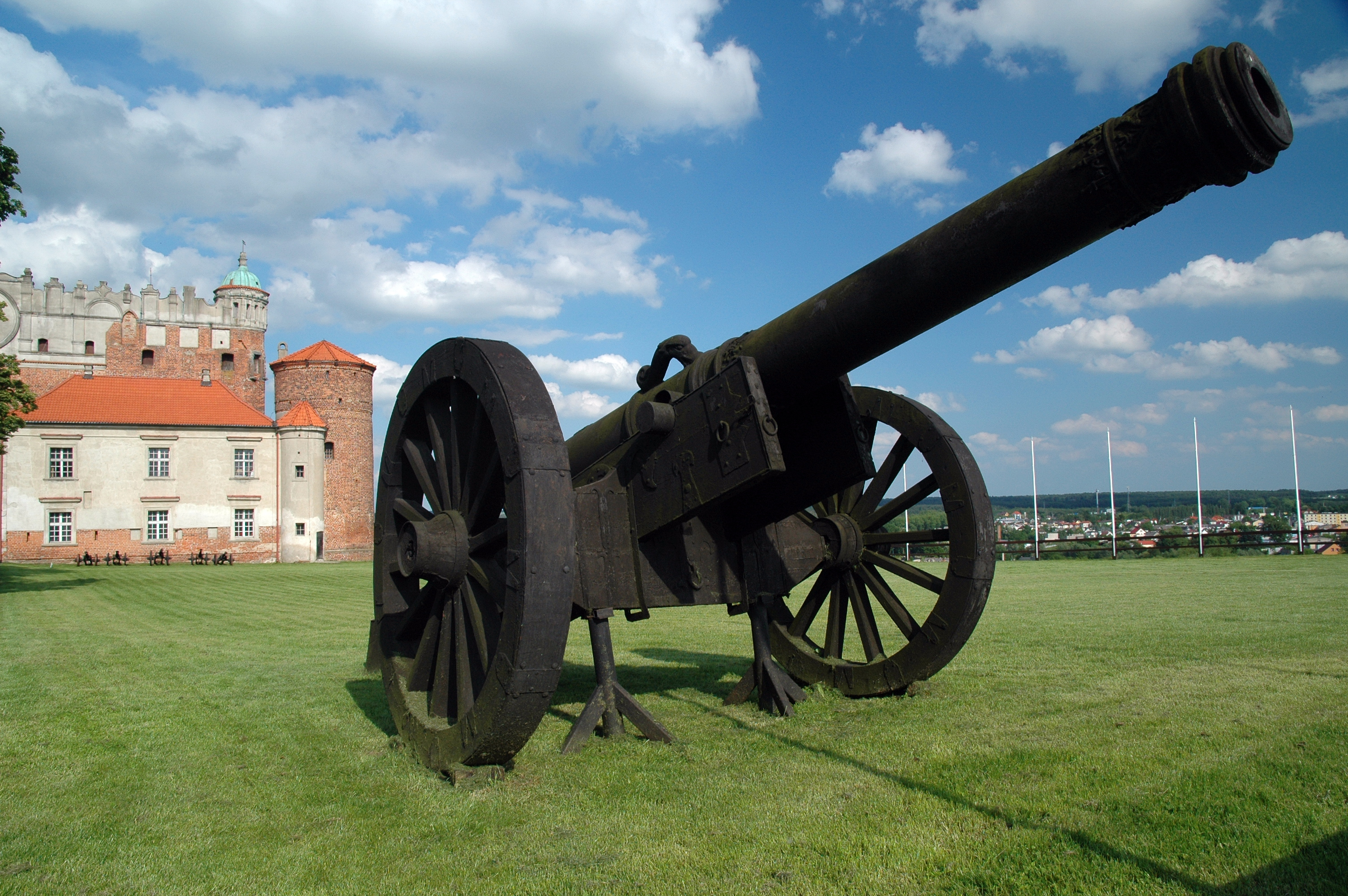
Culverin from film The Deluge in Golub Castle

== Cast ==
- Daniel Olbrychski as Andrzej Kmicic
- Małgorzata Braunek as Oleńka Billewiczówna
- Tadeusz Łomnicki as Michał Wołodyjowski
- Kazimierz Wichniarz as Jan Onufry Zagłoba
- Władysław Hańcza as Janusz Radziwiłł
- Leszek Teleszyński as Bogusław Radziwiłł
- Ryszard Filipski as Soroka
- Wiesława Mazurkiewicz as Aunt Kulwiecówna
- Franciszek Pieczka as Kiemlicz
- Bruno O'Ya as Józwa Butrym
- Bogusz Bilewski as Kulwiec-Hippocentaurus
- Andrzej Kozak as Rekuć Leliwa
- Stanisław Łopatowski as Ranicki
- Stanisław Michalski as Jaromir Kokosiński
- Krzysztof Kowalewski as Roch Kowalski
- Stanisław Jasiukiewicz as Augustyn Kordecki
- Wiesław Gołas as Stefan Czarniecki
- Piotr Pawłowski as John II Casimir of Poland
- Leon Niemczyk as Charles X Gustav of Sweden
- Arkadiusz Bazak as Kuklinowski
- Ferdynand Matysik as Zamoyski

== See also ==
- With Fire and Sword
- Colonel Wolodyjowski
- List of longest films
- List of submissions to the 47th Academy Awards for Best Foreign Language Film
- List of Polish submissions for the Academy Award for Best Foreign Language Film
