= Andrzej Kmicic =

- The Trilogy character
- First appearance: The Deluge
- Last appearance: Fire in the Steppe
- Created by: Henryk Sienkiewicz
- Portrayed by: Daniel Olbrychski (film adaptation)

In-universe information
- Alias: Babinicz
- Nickname: Jędrek
- Gender: Male
- Spouse: Aleksandra Billewiczówna
- Religion: Christian
- Nationality: Lithuanian

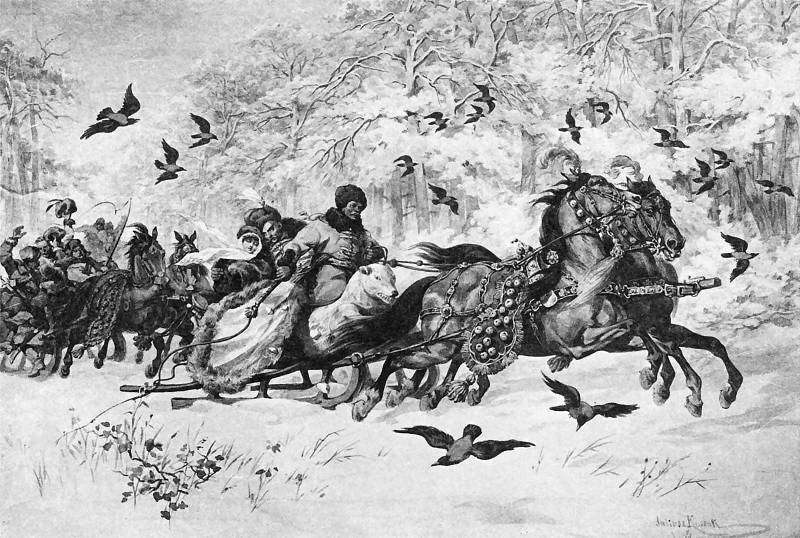
Kmicic and Oleńka going for a sleigh ride

Andrzej Kmicic is a fictional character created by Henryk Sienkiewicz featured in the novel The Deluge (Polish: Potop). He is a typical szlachcic (Polish-Lithuanian noble) from the Polish–Lithuanian Commonwealth; unruly yet patriotic.

At the beginning of the books he is known to be a war hero but also a leader of the robbers. Deceived, he joins Janusz Radziwiłł, who was an ally of the Swedish army, that was invading the Commonwealth. After realising on what side of the conflict he had positioned himself, Kmicic attempts to regain his honor and redeem sins by serving God, the king and the Commonwealth. During the course of the books, he transforms from a villain to a hero.

The 1991–92 Copernicus Society translation by W.S. Kuniczak calls the character Andrei Kmita, rather than Andrzej Kmicic.

The moral transformation of Kmicic is similar to the transformation of Prince Roman from Joseph Conrad's book.

Samuel Kmicic may have served as the prototype of Andrzej Kmicic.
