= Manasterzec =

- Village
- Location within Poland
- Coordinates: 49°31′10″N 22°21′19″E
- Country: Poland
- Voivodeship: Subcarpathian
- County: Lesko
- Gmina: Lesko
- Population: 450

Manasterzec [manaˈstɛʐɛt͡s] is a village in the administrative district of Gmina Lesko, within Lesko County, Subcarpathian Voivodeship, in south-eastern Poland.
