= Deluge (history) =

1648–1666 invasions of Poland–Lithuania

The Deluge
- Part of Northern Wars (Second Northern War and the 1654–1667 Russo-Polish War)
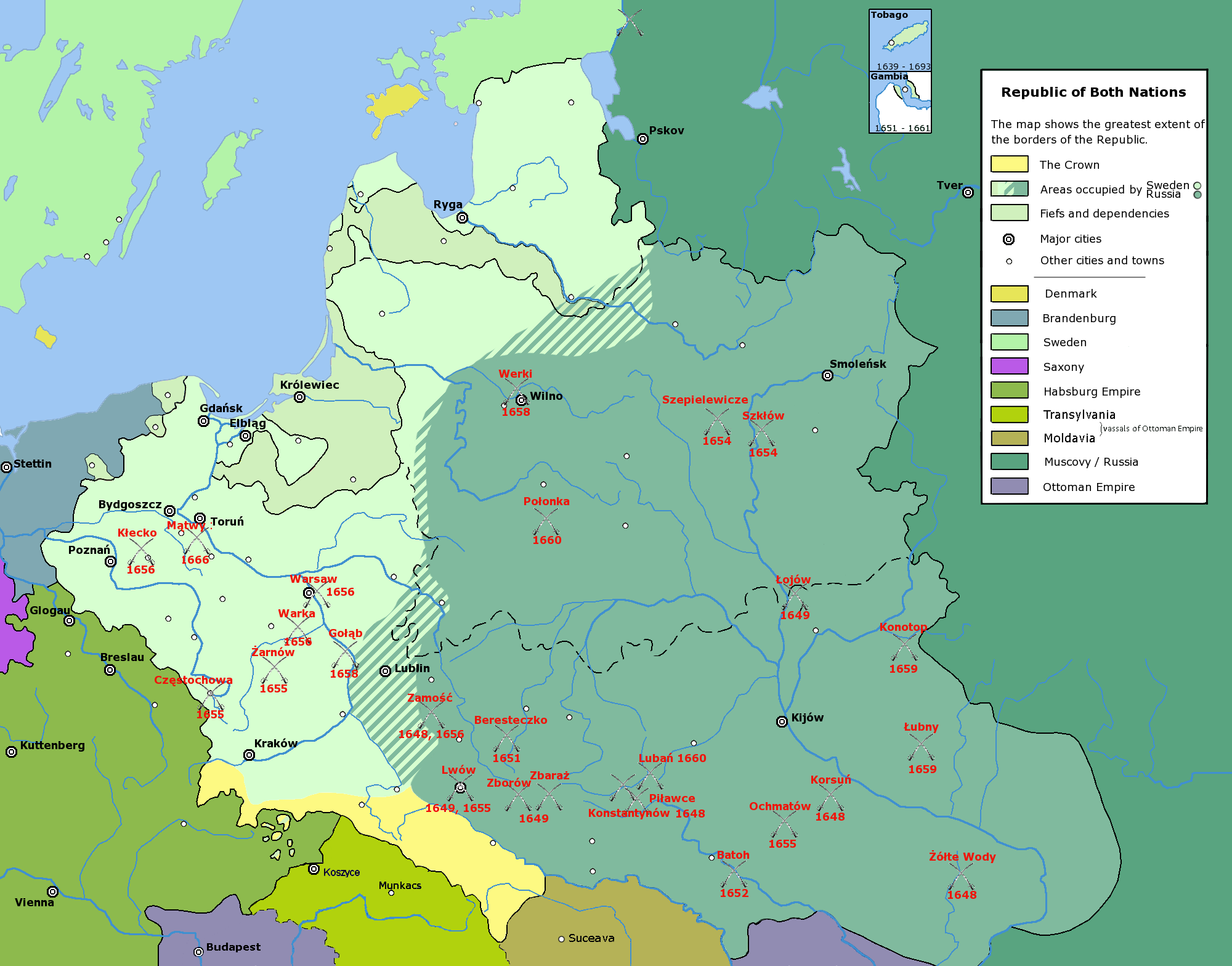
- The occupation of the Commonwealth by Sweden, Russia, Brandenburg and Khmelnytsky's Cossacks
Date	January 25, 1648 – 1666 (wider sense); 1655 – April 23 (O.S.), May 3 (N.S.) 1660 (Swedish Deluge)
Location	Polish–Lithuanian Commonwealth
Result	See § Outcome
Territorial changes	Swedish-ruled part of Livonia was formally ceded by the Commonwealth to Sweden

Belligerents
Poland–Lithuania; Russia (1656–1658); Right-bank Cossacks; Crimean Khanate; Austria (1657–1667); Brandenburg (1657–1667); Denmark–Norway; Dutch Republic	Swedish Empire; Russia (1654–1656, 1658–1667); Brandenburg (1656–1657); Cossack Hetmanate (Left-bank Cossacks); Transylvania (1656–1667); Moldavia; Wallachia; Swedish Lithuania

Commanders and leaders
John II Casimir Vasa; Stefan Czarniecki; Stanisław Potocki; Wincenty Gosiewski; Paweł Jan Sapieha Mehmed IV Giray; (Holy Roman Empire) Leopold I; (Tsardom of Russia) Alexei I	Charles X Gustav #; (Sweden) Adolph John I; (Swedish Empire) Arvid Wittenberg #; (Swedish Empire) Gustaf Otto Stenbock; (Swedish Empire) Lorens von der Linde; Frederick William (1656–1658); Bohdan Khmelnytsky #; Janusz Radziwiłł #; Bogusław Radziwiłł; (Transylvania) George II (surrendered); Alexei I; Gheorghe Ștefan; Constantin Șerban

Strength
69,000	191,000

Casualties and losses
- Total dead: 3,000,000–4,000,000

The Deluge was a series of mid-17th-century military campaigns in the Polish–Lithuanian Commonwealth. In a stricter sense, the term refers to the Swedish invasion and occupation of the Commonwealth as a theatre of the Northern War of 1655–1660 only; in Poland and Lithuania this period is called the Swedish Deluge (Note: (Polish: potop szwedzki, Lithuanian: švedų tvanas, Swedish: svenska syndafloden)) or less commonly the Russo–Swedish Deluge (Polish: Potop szwedzko-rosyjski) due to the simultaneous Russo-Polish War. In a wider sense, it applies to the period between the Khmelnytsky Uprising of 1648 and the Truce of Andrusovo in 1667, comprising the Polish theatres of the Russo-Polish and Second Northern Wars. The term "deluge" (potop in Polish) was popularized by Henryk Sienkiewicz in his novel The Deluge (1886).

During the wars, the Commonwealth lost approximately one third of its population as well as its status as a great power due to invasions by Sweden and Russia. According to Andrzej Rottermund, manager of the Royal Castle in Warsaw, the destruction of Poland in the Deluge was more extensive than the destruction of the country in World War II. Rottermund claims that Swedish invaders robbed the Commonwealth of its most important riches, and most of the stolen items were never returned to Poland. Warsaw, the capital of the Polish–Lithuanian Commonwealth, was destroyed by the Swedes, and out of a pre-war population of 20,000, only 2,000 remained in the city after the war. According to the 2012 Polish estimates, the material damage caused by the Swedish army amounted to 4 billion złotys. 188 cities and towns, 186 villages, 136 churches, 89 palaces, and 81 castles were completely destroyed in Poland.

== Historical background ==
In 1648, Bohdan Khmelnytsky led a popular uprising of Zaporozhian Cossacks and Ukrainian peasants discontented with the rule of Polish and Lithuanian magnates. Although the initial phase of the rebellion ended (after much destruction) at the Battle of Berestechko (1651), it brought into focus the rivalry between Russia and the Commonwealth for hegemony over Ukraine and over the eastern Slavic lands in general. Thus, in October 1653, the Russian Zemsky Sobor declared war on the Commonwealth, and in June 1654 the forces of Tsar Alexis of Russia invaded the eastern half of Poland-Lithuania, starting the Russo-Polish War of 1654–1667. In the summer of 1654, the Russians managed to capture most important cities and strongholds of today's Belarus. Smolensk was captured after a siege on October 3, 1654. The Swedish Empire, which technically already was at war with the Commonwealth (a ceasefire agreement existed from 1629 and was prolonged from 1635 to 1661), invaded in July 1655 and occupied the remaining half of the country.

== Swedish invasion ==
=== Background ===
Following the Thirty Years' War, the Swedish Empire emerged as one of the strongest kingdoms on the continent. It had a large army but little money to pay its soldiers. The Polish–Lithuanian Commonwealth, weakened by wars with the Cossacks and Tsardom of Russia, seemed like easy prey, also because its best soldiers had been either killed in the 1652 Battle of Batih or massacred after it. Furthermore, Swedes remembered claims to their throne by Polish kings Sigismund III Vasa and his sons Władysław IV Vasa and John II Casimir, who themselves belonged to the House of Vasa. An earlier conflict, the Polish–Swedish War (1626–1629) had ended with the Treaty of Stuhmsdorf.

The Polish–Lithuanian King John II Casimir (reigned 1648–68) lacked support among the Commonwealth nobility (szlachta) due to his sympathies with absolutist Austria and his open contempt for the "Sarmatist" culture of the nobility. Earlier, in 1643, John Casimir had become a member of the Jesuits and had received the title of Cardinal. Nevertheless, in December 1646, he returned to Poland and, in October 1647, resigned his position as Cardinal to stand for election to the Polish throne, after the death of his brother Władysław IV Vasa. He became King in 1648. However, some of the nobility supported Charles Gustav (King of Sweden from 1654 to 1660 and John Casimir's cousin) for the Polish–Lithuanian throne. Many members of the Polish nobility regarded John Casimir as a weak king or a "Jesuit-King"; Grand Treasurer Bogusław Leszczyński, a Protestant, and Deputy Chancellor of the Crown Hieronim Radziejowski, an old enemy of the Polish King who had been exiled to Sweden, encouraged Charles Gustav to claim the Polish crown. Two Lithuanian noble princes, Janusz Radziwiłł and Bogusław Radziwiłł, introduced dissension into the Commonwealth and began negotiations with the Swedish king Charles X Gustav of Sweden aimed at breaking up the Commonwealth and the Polish–Lithuanian union. They signed the Treaty of Kėdainiai (1655), which envisaged the Radziwiłł princes ruling over two duchies carved out from the Grand Duchy of Lithuania under Swedish protection.

=== 1655 ===
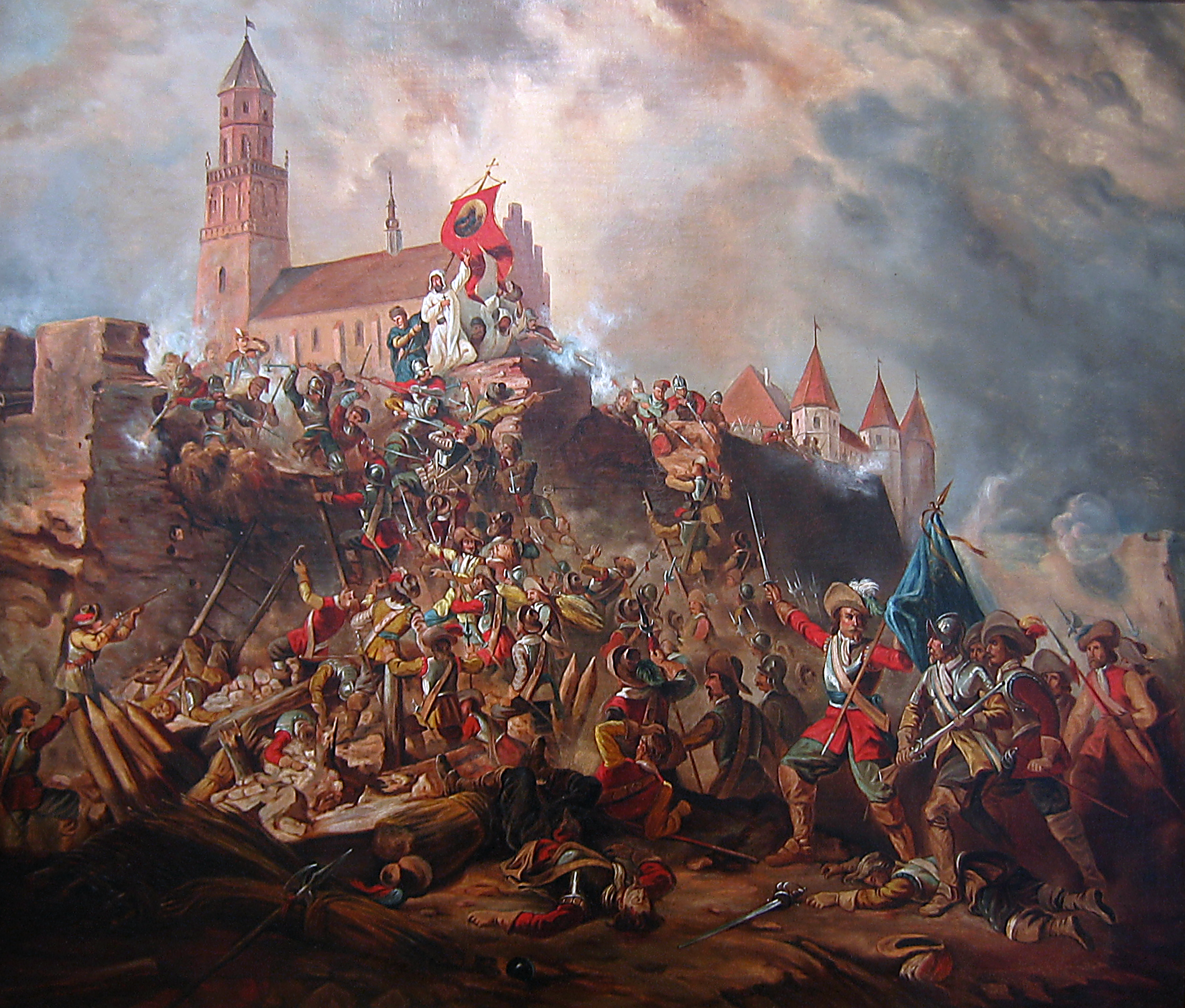
Nineteenth-century depiction of the 1655 Siege of Jasna Góra.

In July 1655 two Swedish armies, operating from Swedish Pomerania and the Province of Pomerania, entered Greater Poland, one of the richest and most developed provinces of the Commonwealth, which had for centuries been unaffected by any military conflicts, and whose levée en masse had not been used to fighting. Greater Poland's noble camp, located in the valley of the Noteć river, near the town of Ujście, looked more like a large party, as the szlachta, gathered there to face the Swedish Army, was more interested in drinking. To make matters worse, two powerful magnates, the Voivode of Poznań Krzysztof Opaliński, and the Voivode of Kalisz, Andrzej Karol Grudziński, argued with each other whether to fight or to give up. Polish troops lacked gunpowder, cannons, and even food, which was stolen at local villages by hungry soldiers.

After an easy Swedish victory at the Battle of Ujście, Krzysztof Opaliński surrendered Greater Poland to Charles Gustav. On July 31, 1655, the army commanded by Arvid Wittenberg captured Poznań, and on August 20 near Konin, the armies of Wittenberg and Charles Gustav joined forces, and headed for Warsaw. On September 2, the Poles lost the Battle of Sobota, and on September 4, the Swedes captured Łowicz. Four days later, the Swedish army entered the Polish capital, becoming the first foreign army in history to capture Warsaw. King Charles Gustav left a garrison in Warsaw, under Bengt Gabrielsson Oxenstierna, and headed southwards, in pursuit of John Casimir. On September 16, the Swedes defeated Polish troops in the Battle of Żarnów, and the Polish forces gave up resistance and surrendered to the invaders. The Polish king headed towards Kraków on September 25, and then fled to the Głogówek castle near Prudnik in Upper Silesia. Kraków was left in the hands of Stefan Czarniecki; on October 3 Swedish forces once again defeated the Poles in the Battle of Wojnicz, which opened the road to Kraków. The ancient capital of Poland was captured after a siege, on October 13, 1655. With the three most populated and best developed Polish provinces in his hands (Greater Poland, Lesser Poland and Mazovia), Charles Gustav decided to head back northwards to Royal Prussia, which was defended by the Voivode of Malbork, Jakub Wejher. The Swedes, who were generally superior in training, discipline, and equipment, advanced rapidly.

Meanwhile, in the Grand Duchy of Lithuania, whose eastern part had been occupied by another Swedish army under Magnus Gabriel De la Gardie since August 1655, Janusz Radziwiłł and his cousin Bogusław Radziwiłł signed the Union of Kėdainiai (October 20, 1655), which ended Lithuania's union with Poland. The decision of the Radziwiłłs was the result of the 1654 Russian invasion, as Janusz Radziwiłł accused the Poles of not helping the Lithuanians with the defence of the Grand Duchy. The Russian capture of Vilnius (August 9, 1655) and the subsequent slaughter of its residents convinced the Lithuanian nobility that Swedish protection was the best solution. The situation of the Commonwealth was desperate, but hope appeared with the Truce of Vilna (November 3), in which Poland and the Tsardom of Russia formed an anti-Swedish alliance. With Russian forces attacking Sweden in Livonia (see Russo-Swedish War (1656–1658)), Poland finally had time to recoup and gather fresh forces. On October 12, 1655, with permission from King John Casimir, Frederick William, Elector of Brandenburg signed the Treaty of Rinsk, in which the Royal Prussian nobility agreed to allow Brandenburgian garrisons in their province to defend it against the Swedish invasion (the treaty did not include the cities of Gdańsk, Elbląg and Toruń). In November and December 1655 the Swedish army under Gustaf Otto Stenbock captured all the towns of Royal Prussia except for Gdańsk, Puck and Malbork.

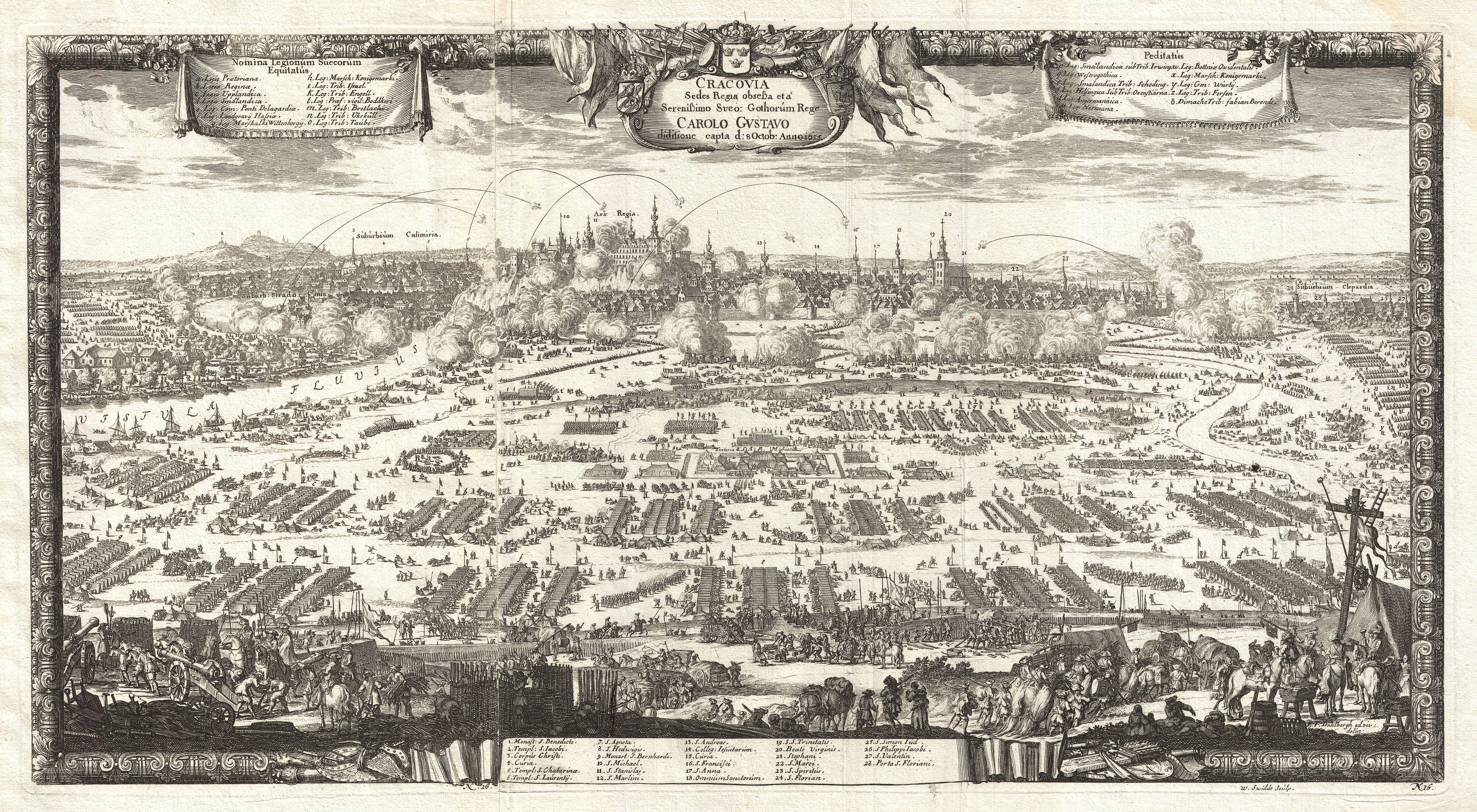
Swedish Siege of Kraków in 1655

To prevent John Casimir's return to Poland, Swedish units protected the border with Silesia. On November 18, 1655, the Swedes besieged the monastery at Jasna Góra, located in Lesser Poland, near the border. Led by the Grand Prior Augustyn Kordecki, the garrison of this symbolic sanctuary-fortress of Poland held off its enemies in the Siege of Jasna Góra. The defense of Jasna Góra galvanized Polish resistance against the Swedes. The news of the siege spread across the nation, and in several areas guerrilla units were created, outraged at the Swedes' attempt to seize the monastery. On December 7, 1655, the unit of Colonel Gabriel Wojniłłowicz defeated the Swedes and their Polish collaborators near Krosno. On December 13, Polish troops under Wojniłłowicz recaptured Nowy Sącz, and soon afterwards Sweden lost Biała, Dukla, Biecz, Wieliczka, and Oświęcim. By late 1655, the situation in southern Lesser Poland had deteriorated to such an extent for the invaders that on December 27 they decided to lift the siege of Jasna Góra. On December 16, 1655, in Sokal, Polish Crown hetmans urged the nation to fight the Swedish armies. Two days later, King John Casimir left the Głogówek in Silesia, and via Racibórz and Cieszyn, returned to Poland, arriving at Lubowla on December 27. Two days later, the Tyszowce Confederation was formed in support of the Polish king. John Casimir himself met with hetmans Stanisław Rewera Potocki, Jerzy Sebastian Lubomirski, Stanisław Lanckoroński and Stefan Czarniecki in Krosno, on December 31, 1655. The meeting was also attended by Primate Andrzej Leszczyński, and eight voivodes.

=== 1656 ===
While in Krosno, the Polish king found out about the end of the siege of Jasna Góra, and about the death of Janusz Radziwiłł. On January 12, 1656, John Casimir left Krosno, and after three days, arrived at Łańcut Castle, which belonged to the Lubomirski family. On February 10, the king came to Lwów, which, together with Gdańsk, was one of only two major cities of the Commonwealth not seized by any of Poland's enemies. Soon Polish Army units began to concentrate in the area of Lwów, including militias from Red Ruthenia, Volhynia and Lublin, as well as forces under Potocki and Prince Lubomirski, together with the garrison of Kamieniec Podolski fortress. Charles Gustav, after finding out about the return of the Polish king, ordered his armies to concentrate in Łowicz. On February 8, 1656, the Swedes defeated Czarniecki in the Battle of Gołąb, and continued their march towards Lwów, reaching the Zamość Fortress on February 25. On March 1, realizing that without heavy guns it was impossible to capture the mighty stronghold, the Swedish army gave up the siege, and headed towards Bełżec. On March 3, Charles Gustav, whose units were harassed by Polish guerilla forces, decided to retreat. At the same time, guerilla warfare also broke out in Mazovia and Greater Poland, and Lithuanian units under the Grand Hetman of Lithuania Paweł Jan Sapieha began moving towards Red Ruthenia.

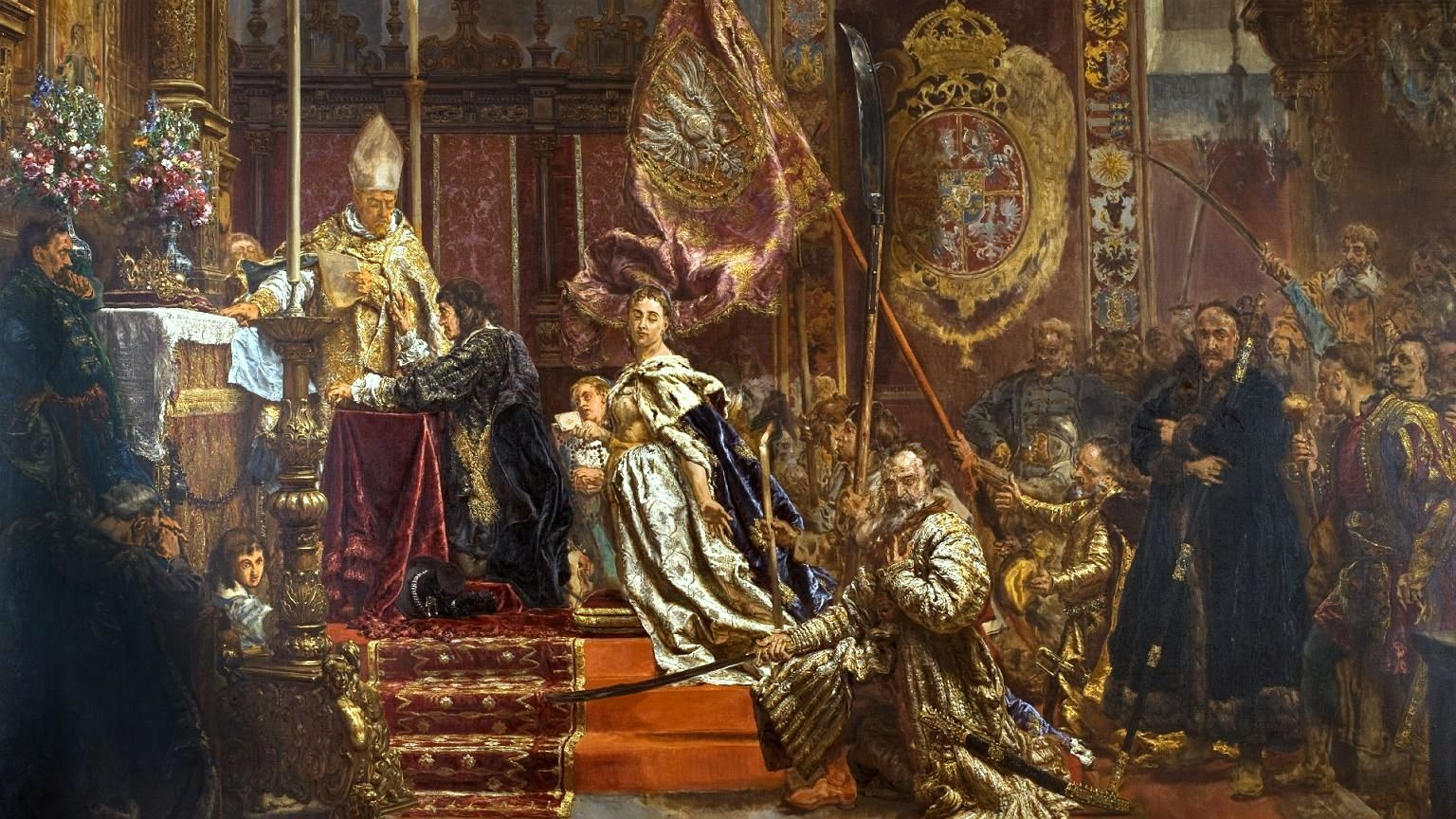
The Vow of John Casimir by Jan Matejko (1838–1893) shows the Polish king in Lwów in 1655, pledging to drive out the Swedes.

On March 11, the Swedish army arrived at Jarosław, fighting its way across the San river. Charles Gustav sent some of his forces to capture Przemyśl, but on March 16 they returned to Jarosław without success. On March 22, the Swedish army set off northwards, along the San and Vistula rivers, back to Warsaw. They were followed by units of Stefan Czarniecki and Aleksander Koniecpolski, and during the retreat, Polish troops supporting the invaders changed sides, joining the forces of John Casimir. On March 30, the starving, cold and tired Swedish army of 5,000 stopped near Sandomierz, which was already in Polish hands. The Swedes camped among the forests of Sandomierz Forest near Gorzyce, where they were quickly surrounded by approximately 23,000 Poles and Lithuanians. To help the besieged army, on March 27 Frederick VI left Warsaw with 2,500 reiters and dragoons, so John Casimir ordered the mounted units of Czarnecki and Lubomirski to face the margrave. Frederick's army was defeated on April 7 in the Battle of Warka. At Gorzyce, however, second-quality Polish forces remained, and the Swedish king managed to break out (April 5), and on April 13, Charles Gustav reached Warsaw. Meanwhile, the Polish king made the Lwów Oath (April 1), in which he entrusted the Commonwealth to the Blessed Virgin Mary's protection, and declared her 'The Queen of the Polish Crown'.

After the Battle of Warka, Czarniecki and Lubomirski decided to head towards Greater Poland and Kujawy, to support guerrilla forces active there. By April 9, Polish troops reached Royal Prussia, capturing Bydgoszcz and Nakło (April 19). The Polish attempt to capture Toruń, on April 17, was a failure. After a short rest, Stefan Czarniecki considered a raid of Swedish Pomerania, but other Polish leaders opposed this idea. Charles Gustav decided to prevent the Poles from taking control of the northern districts of the country, and departed Warsaw with an army of 10,000 (April 17). On April 21, the Lithuanians under Sapieha freed Lublin, and on April 23, the Lithuanian army reached Praga, which today is a right-bank district of Warsaw. The forces of Czarniecki and Lubomirski joined other troops near Piła, but on May 7 they were defeated in the Battle of Kłecko, despite their numerical superiority. After the battle, the surviving Polish units regrouped near Gniezno, and in late May, they headed for Warsaw, to help the Lithuanians in the siege of the Polish capital (April 24 – July 1). Warsaw was being defended by Arvid Wittenberg with 2,000 soldiers, as the main Swedish army was busy besieging Gdańsk. Wittenberg capitulated on July 1, 1656.

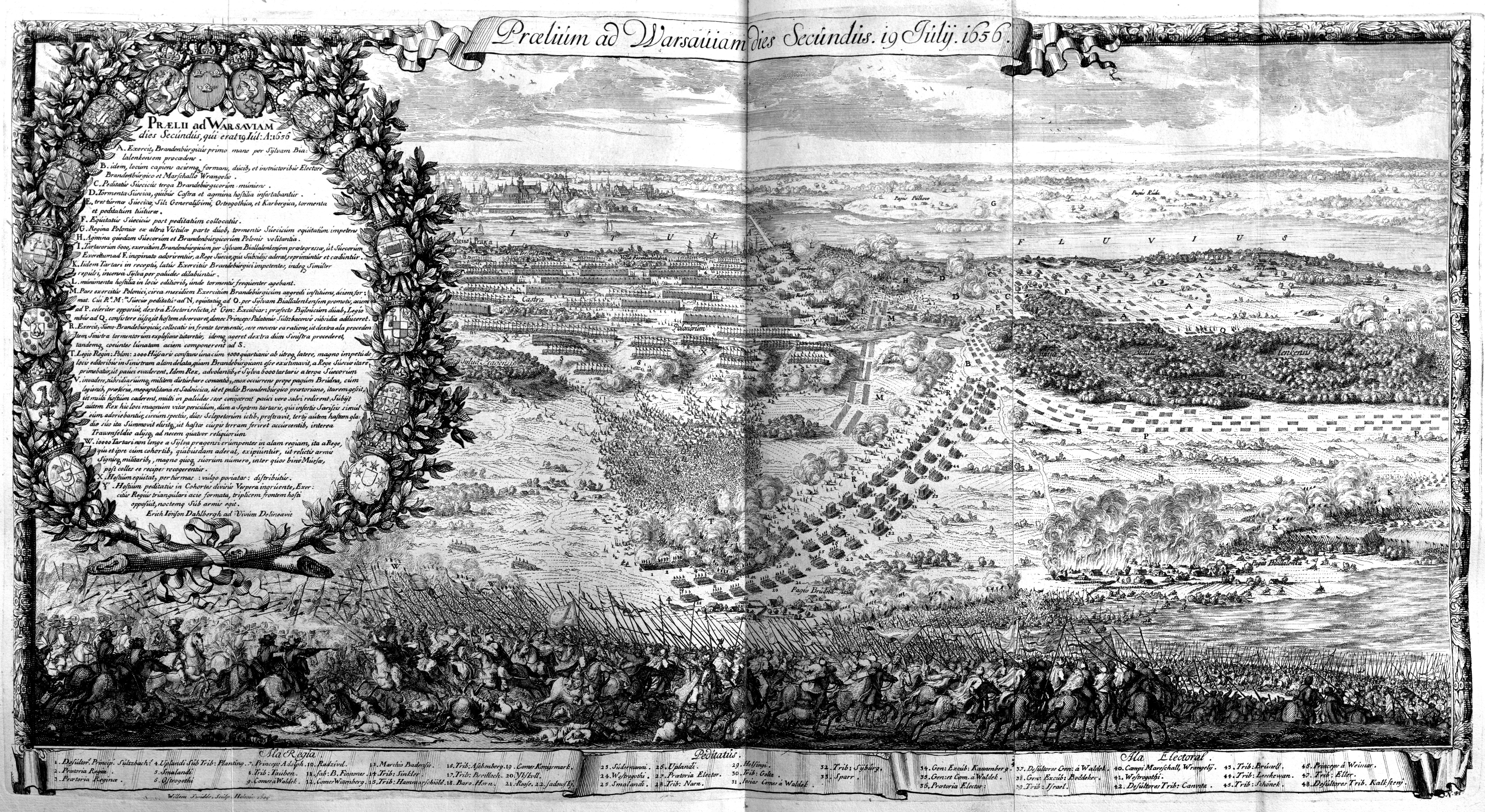
Battle of Warsaw in 1656

Already in late 1655, Charles Gustav realized that it would be impossible for him to control the Commonwealth. The Swedish king decided to find allies, who would help him to divide Poland-Lithuania. On June 29, 1656, he signed the Treaty of Marienburg, in which he offered Frederick William, Elector of Brandenburg a reward for fighting on his side. Brandenburg-Prussia was promised sovereignty in four voivodeships – Poznań, Kalisz, Łęczyca, and Sieradz. On July 28, a reinforced Swedish–Brandenburgian army, under Charles Gustav, set out for Warsaw. Even though the allied army was smaller, it still managed to defeat the Poles and Lithuanians in the Battle of Warsaw (July 28–30), and to recapture Warsaw. This victory, however, achieved little, as the Poles retreated behind the Wieprz, where they regrouped, and were soon ready to continue fighting. Finally, Charles Gustav decided to abandon Warsaw, and retreat to Royal Prussia. To punish Brandenburg-Prussia, Commonwealth forces decided to invade the Duchy of Prussia. In early October 1656, an army of 11,000 under Wincenty Korwin Gosiewski entered Prussia, supported by 2,000 Crimean Tatars. On October 8, Gosiewski's army won the Battle of Prostken (October 8), but after the Tatars decided to return to the Crimea, the Polish–Lithuanian army was defeated in the Battle of Filipów (October 22). In November 1656, Greater Poland's troops invaded the Brandenburger province of Neumark, which resulted in withdrawal of Brandenburger forces from most of Greater Poland. Charles Gustav, knowing that he needed the support of the Elector, agreed to sign the Treaty of Labiau (November 20), which granted full sovereignty to the Prussian ruler, in exchange for his complete military support of Sweden in the ongoing war. The Commonwealth, on the other hand, had already been negotiating with the House of Habsburg. On December 1, 1656, the first Treaty of Vienna was signed, which was followed by a second Treaty of Vienna, in which Emperor Leopold I promised to aid John Casimir with 12,000 troops against the Swedish-Brandenburgian alliance. By late 1656, Swedish troops had been pushed out of most of the Commonwealth. They only held the right-bank half of Royal Prussia, northern Mazovia, Łowicz, Kraków, and Tykocin.

=== 1657 ===
In 1653, the Transylvanian Hungarian ruler George II Rákóczi signed an alliance with Poland, and the relations between the Commonwealth and Transylvania were friendly. George had even been offered the Polish crown, on condition that he convert to Catholicism. Stunning Swedish successes, however, made Rákóczi change his mind. On May 18, 1656, Charles X Gustav, in a letter sent from Malbork, offered the Hungarian prince Red Ruthenia, in exchange for military support against the Commonwealth. Meanwhile, Rákóczi had already been negotiating with Bohdan Khmelnytsky, and on September 7, 1656, Transylvania and the Zaporizhian Sich signed a peace treaty, which obliged both sides to help each other in war. On December 8, 1656, the Treaty of Radnot was signed, which divided Poland-Lithuania among Charles X Gustav, Bogusław Radziwiłł, Elector Frederick William, Bohdan Khmelnytsky, and George II Rákóczi. In late January 1657, the Transylvanian army of 25,000 crossed the Carpathians, heading towards Medyka, where 10,000 Cossack allies awaited them. To face the new invader, the army of hetman Stanisław Rewera Potocki rushed southwards. At the same time (January 2), in the Battle of Chojnice, the Swedes defeated the Poles. On February 26, Stefan Czarniecki and King John Casimir met in Kalisz, where they decided to prevent the Swedish and Transylvanian armies from meeting.

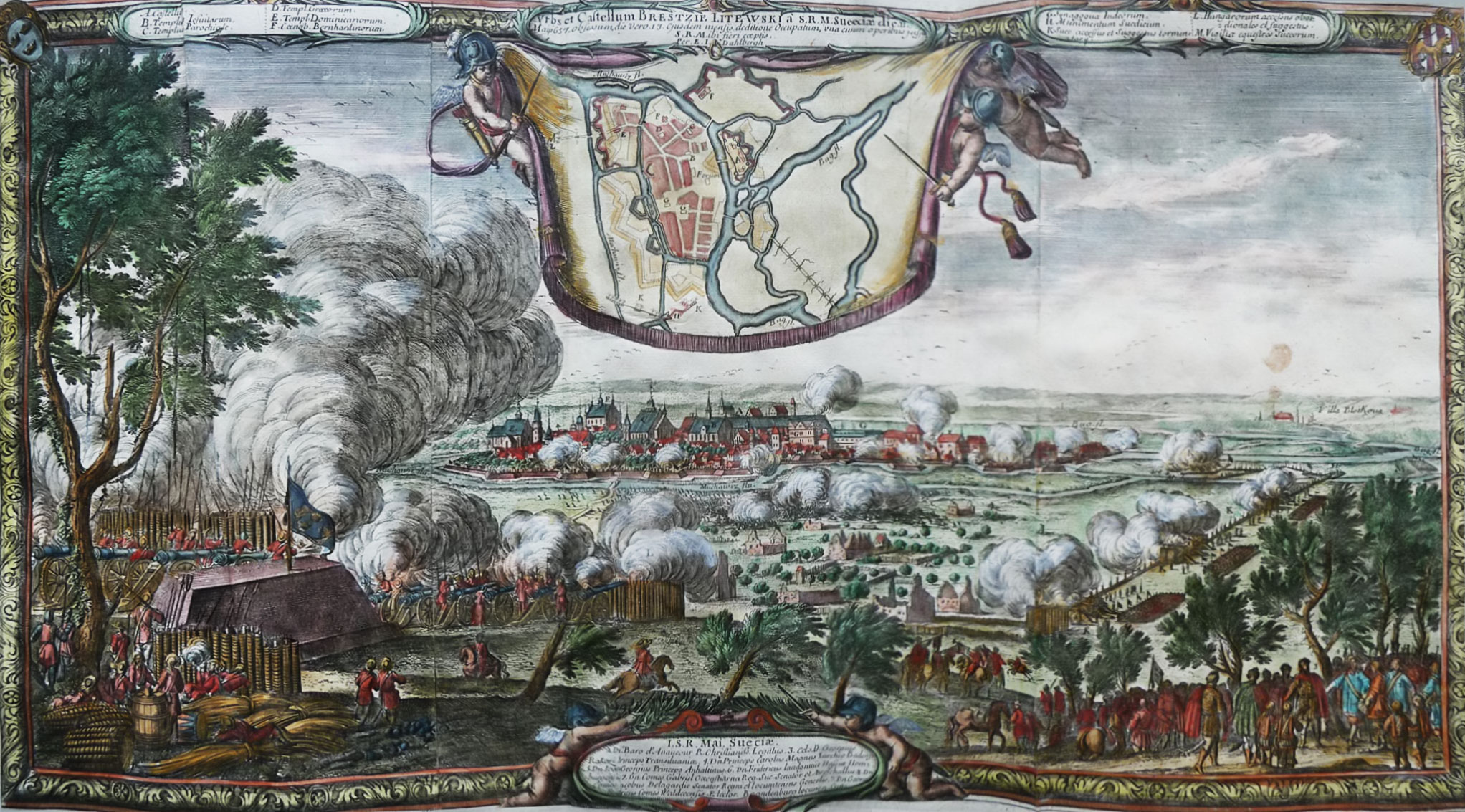
Transylvanian–Swedish Siege of Brest in 1657, painted by E. Dahlbergh

After joining the Cossacks, Rákóczi decided not to attack Lwów, but set off towards Kraków, where the situation of the Swedish garrison under Wirtz was desperate. On March 21, Rákóczi captured Tarnów, and on March 28, he reached Kraków. Along the way to the ancient Polish capital, the Transylvanian-Cossack army burned and looted towns and villages, murdering thousands. Since his army was too busy looting Lesser Poland, only 5,000 soldiers reached Kraków, which by the Treaty of Radnot, was to be ruled by Transylvania. After leaving 2,500 soldiers to help the Swedish garrison of Kraków, Rákóczi's army headed northwards, along the Vistula. On April 12, 1657, the Transylvanian-Cossack army met with Swedish forces under Charles X Gustav, at Ćmielów. The joined forces began to follow the Polish Crown army under Stanisław Potocki, and the Lithuanian army under Paweł Sapieha, to force a decisive battle. On April 29, the Polish and Lithuanian armies joined forces at Łosice, and in early May 1657, the Poles decided to organize a revenge raid on Transylvania, under hetman Jerzy Sebastian Lubomirski. On May 13, Rákóczi and Charles X Gustav seized the fortress of Brześć Litewski, and on May 17, after a three-day siege, the Swedes, Cossacks, and Transylvanians captured Warsaw. Soon afterwards, however, the Dano-Swedish War began, and Charles X Gustav left Poland with most of his troops. The remaining Swedish army was commanded by Gustaf Otto Stenbock. The Swedish withdrawal made Rákóczi uneasy, as he was well aware of the poor quality of his soldiers. On July 7–8, 1656, at Łańcut Castle, King John Casimir and his hetmans agreed that Stefan Czarniecki would follow Rákóczi and the Cossacks, while Lubomirski's and Potocki's divisions together with Crimean Tatars.

The Ottomans were offended that George II Rakoczi, who was officially their vassal, did not ask their approval to attack Poland and did not want to open another war (in that time they tried to attack Venice through Dalmatia) but when he ignored them they ordered the Crimean Tatars to help the Polish troops and punish Rakoczi. They already replaced Rakoczi's vassal voivodes from Moldavia and Wallachia.

On June 20, 1657, Stenbock was ordered by Charles X Gustav to abandon Rákóczi and head with his army to Stettin. To save his skin, the ruler of Transylvania began a quick retreat southwards, towards the Carpathians. On July 11, Stefan Czarniecki's division defeated Rákóczi at Magierów near Lwów, and on July 20, the Transylvanian-Cossack army was destroyed in the Battle of Czarny Ostrów in Podolia. Three days later, Rákóczi signed a peace treaty with the Commonwealth, in which he promised to break the alliance with Sweden, withdraw his troops from Kraków and Brześć Litewski, and pay for the damage inflicted by his army. On July 26, remnants of the Transylvanian army were surrounded by the Tatars near Skałat. Rákóczi himself managed to flee, and the army was temporarily commanded by John Kemény, who himself was captured by the Tatars. After six months of fighting in Poland, Rákóczi's army of 25,000 ceased to exist, with all survivors taken prisoner by the Tatars.

On August 30, the Swedish garrison left Kraków, and throughout August and September 1657, all Swedish troops in Poland moved northwards, to Royal Prussia. Altogether, by autumn of that year, only some 8,000 Swedish soldiers remained in Poland–Lithuania. The Swedes still kept some Prussian cities, as Malbork, Elbląg, Sztum, Brodnica, Grudziądz, and Toruń. On September 11, an Austrian army of 11,000, allied with Poland, concentrated near Kraków and set off to Płock, where it spent the winter. Polish army commanders and King John Casimir, gathered in Poznań on November 26, decided to delay the attack on Swedish forces in Royal Prussia until spring 1658. On November 6, 1657, Poland and Brandenburg–Prussia signed the Treaty of Bromberg. Ducal Prussia, which had previously allied itself with Sweden and attacked Poland, changed sides and guaranteed military support of the Commonwealth, in return for sovereignty (it had been a fief of Poland since 1466). This treaty is regarded by historian Józef Włodarski as one of the worst mistakes in Polish history.

=== 1658–1660 ===
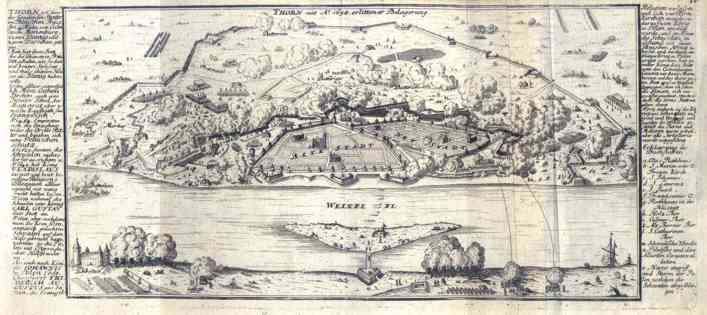
Siege of Toruń in 1658

In the spring of 1658, the Polish army, together with its Austrian allies under Raimondo Montecuccoli, began a campaign in Royal Prussia, where several key towns and cities were still in Swedish hands. On July 1, the siege of Toruń began. The heavily fortified city was defended by 2400 soldiers under Barthod Hartwig von Bülow. The Polish troops included the divisions of Krzysztof Grodzicki, Jan Sapieha and Stefan Czarniecki. Furthermore, they were provided support by the Brandenburgian-Prussian army of Bogusław Radziwiłł, which after the Treaty of Bromberg changed sides. Altogether, almost 25,000 soldiers besieged Toruń. After a prolonged artillery bombardment, the main attack took place in the night of November 16–17, and on December 30 Toruń capitulated. Meanwhile, Stefan Czarniecki's division headed to Denmark–Norway, to help the Danes in the Dano-Swedish War. In October 1658, the Polish army of 4500 reached Hamburg, and in December 1658, with the help of Polish troops, the fortress of Kolding was captured (see Battle of Kolding).

On July 1, 1658, the Sejm ordered the expulsion of the Polish Brethren, who were accused of collaborating with the Swedish invaders.

In 1659, the Swedish army still remaining in Poland under Lorens von der Linde was withdrawn to major Royal Prussian fortresses – Malbork, Głowa Gdańska, Grudziądz, Elbląg, and Brodnica. In August 1659, the Polish army captured Głowa and Grudziądz, and soon afterwards, the starving Swedish garrison at Brodnica surrendered. The siege of Malbork was continued, and Polish – Brandenburgian troops blocked Elbląg. In December 1659, the siege of Elbląg began. Meanwhile, in late 1658, the Polish–Russian truce ended when Russian forces under Ivan Andreyevich Khovansky (Tararui) and Jurij Aleksiejewicz Dołgorukow again attacked the Polish – Lithuanian units (see Russo-Polish War (1654–1667)). The Russians managed to capture large parts of the Commonwealth, but were later defeated in the Battle of Konotop and the Battle of Polonka.

On May 3, 1660, the Treaty of Oliva was signed, which ended the Polish–Swedish War. After the conclusion of the conflict, Poland–Lithuania initiated a large offensive against the Russians, who were beaten in the Battle of Chudnov. In 1661, Vilnius was recaptured (December 2), and in 1663–64, Polish forces invaded Left-bank Ukraine. The war with Russia ended with the Truce of Andrusovo (January 30, 1667).

== Other conflicts ==
The Deluge was the climax of a series of wars that took place in Poland–Lithuania in the mid-17th century. The Commonwealth was first affected by the Khmelnytsky Uprising, which began in 1648, and affected southeastern provinces of the country. In the final stages of the uprising, the Russians invaded Poland–Lithuania in 1654, reaching as far west as the Vistula river near Puławy. The Commonwealth also fought forces from Transylvania and Brandenburg-Prussia, but the Duchy of Prussia gained formal Polish recognition of its independence outside of the Polish state (Treaty of Wehlau, 1657). The Tatars of the Crimean Khanate and the Nogai Horde conducted almost annual slave raids in the territories controlled by the Commonwealth. In all these other invasions, only the Russian invaders caused the most similar damages to the Swedes, due to Russian raids, destructions and rapid incursion which crippled Polish industries.

With the Treaty of Hadiach on September 16, 1658, the Polish Crown sought to elevate the Cossacks and Ruthenians to a position equal to that of Poland and Lithuania in the Polish–Lithuanian Union, and in fact transform the Polish–Lithuanian Commonwealth into a Polish–Lithuanian–Ruthenian Commonwealth (Polish: Rzeczpospolita Trojga Narodów, "Commonwealth of Three Nations"). Supported by Cossack Hetman Ivan Vyhovsky and the starshyna, the treaty aimed to change the face of Eastern Europe. However, its terms never came into full operation: in addition to the unpopularity of continued integration with the Commonwealth with the majority of the Cossacks, Russia refused to recognize Hadiach, and maintained its claims to Ukraine. The Russo-Polish War (1654–1667) ended with the Treaty of Andrusovo of January 13, 1667. (Poland-Lithuania profited from Turkish participation in the Russo-Turkish War (1676–1681) due to Ottoman links with the Crimea.) The peace settlement gave Russia control over the so-called Left-bank Ukraine (left of the river Dnieper), with the Commonwealth retaining Right-bank Ukraine (right of the Dnieper). While initially the agreement stipulated that Russia would return Left-bank Ukraine to the Commonwealth in twenty years, the division became permanent with the Eternal Peace Treaty of 1686.

The Deluge brought to an end the era of religious tolerance in the Commonwealth: mostly non-Catholic invaders antagonized Catholic (including Uniate) population. The expulsion of the Protestant Polish Brethren from Poland in 1658 exemplified the increasing intolerance. During the Deluge, many thousands of Polish Jews also fell victim to violence carried out by the Zaporozhian Cossacks and Polish-Lithuanian forces.

== Outcome ==
The Treaty of Oliva signed in 1660 meant that: Poland gave up most of Livonia with Riga, retaining only part of it (Latgale – the south-eastern part of Livonia) which was in Russian hands at the time, until the Armistice of Andrusov in 1667. King John II Casimir Vasa renounced his right to claim the Swedish throne for himself and those who succeeded him. He did, however, retain the title of King of Sweden for the rest of his life. Sweden had pledged to uphold freedom of trade in the Baltic.

According to historian Michael Fredholm von Essen, the Deluge "did not end in a Swedish defeat" and "did not end in a Commonwealth victory".

== Devastation of the Commonwealth ==
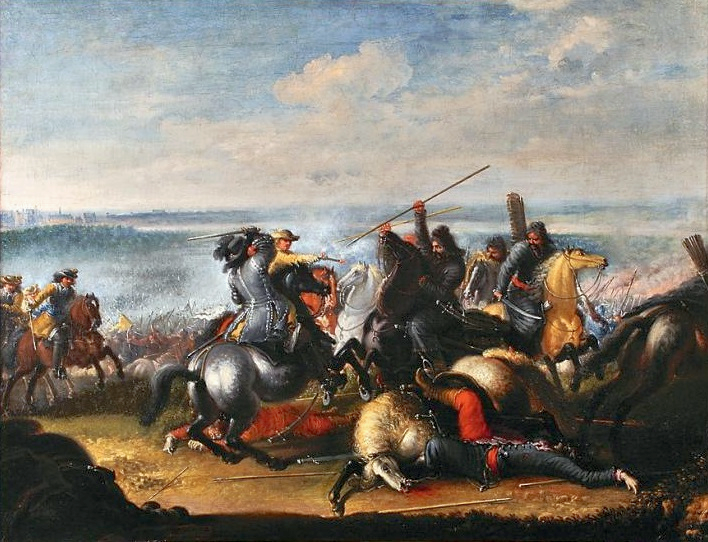
Charles X Gustav in skirmish with Tatars at the battle of Warsaw, July 29, 1656. Johan Philip Lemke, oil on canvas, 1684.

The Swedish invasion affected the richest provinces of the Polish–Lithuanian Commonwealth (Greater Poland, Lesser Poland, Mazovia, Pomerelia, Kujawy, Podlasie), which for the most part had not been affected by major wars for 200 years. According to Professor Andrzej Rottermund, manager of the Royal Castle in Warsaw, the Swedish army robbed Poland of her most precious goods – thousands of works of art, books and valuables. Most of these items have never been returned to Poland, and are kept both in private Swedish hands and in Stockholm museums, such as the Swedish Army Museum, and Livrustkammaren. Almost all cities, towns, castles and churches in locations where Swedish troops were stationed were destroyed, and in guides to many Polish towns and cities one can find notes that read "object destroyed during Swedish invasion". From the Royal Castle in Warsaw the Swedes plundered approximately 200 paintings, a number of carpets and Turkish tents, musical instruments, furniture, Chinese porcelain, weapons, books, manuscripts, marbles, even dresses of maids and door frames pulled from walls. Meanwhile, the Russian invaders in the east had also destroyed and damaged much of the eastern part's infrastructure, partly due to heavy agricultural fertile developments there.

Hubert Kowalski of the University of Warsaw Institute of Archeology says that Swedes stole anything they could lay their hands on – windows, stairs, chimneys, sculptures, floors, doors and gates. Most goods were loaded on boats and transported along the Vistula to the Baltic Sea and then to Sweden. In November 2011, archaeologists of the University of Warsaw found approximately 70 items (total weight five tons), which probably come from the Warsaw Royal Castle. They sank in the Vistula while being transported to Sweden. Even though Article 9 of the Treaty of Oliva stated that Sweden should return all stolen goods, all items are still kept in Stockholm and other Swedish locations. Several Polish kings (John II Casimir, John III Sobieski and Stanisław II Augustus) sent official missions to Sweden, but without success. In most situations, Swedish authorities claimed that they did not know where stolen goods were. In 1911, Kraków's Academy of Science sent its own mission, which was made up of renowned professors Eugeniusz Barwiński, Ludwik Birkenmajer and Jan Łoś. In Stockholm and Uppsala they found 205 manuscripts and 168 rare Polish books, describing their foundings in a report. In 2002, the Warsaw Royal Castle organized an exhibition, "Eagle and Three Crowns", which presented many items stolen from Poland, and kept in Swedish museums. After the Deluge, the Commonwealth became a "cultural desert". Poland and Lithuania lost 67 libraries and 17 archives. Of all major cities of the country, only Lwów and Gdańsk were not destroyed, and when Swedish soldiers were unable to steal an item, they would destroy or burn it. Many castles, palaces, churches, abbeys, towns and villages were left in ruins. As a result of the Swedish invasion, few pre-Baroque buildings remained in Poland. An estimated 3 million died.

Swedish troops stole, damaged or destroyed many cultural institutions and artefacts, including:

- Polish and Lithuanian state records (Metrica Regni Poloniae),
- the royal library from Warsaw,
- libraries from Ujazdów Castle, Toruń, Bydgoszcz, Malbork, Poznań, Grudziądz, Gniezno, Lublin, Jarosław, Vilnius, Sandomierz, Radom, and Kraków, as well as archives and libraries from most towns of Royal Prussia. Most of the stolen books are kept in the University Library at Uppsala, the Royal Library at Stockholm, and private libraries of the Bielke, Oxenstierna, Rosenhahne, and Brahe families.
- all Warsaw palaces were damaged and looted; the Kazanowski Palace, the Ossoliński Palace, the Daniłłowicz Palace, the Primate Palace, the Bishophoric Palace, the Royal Palace, and the Royal Castle were completely robbed.
- castles and churches, which were robbed and destroyed, as were almost all Polish towns; the most notable examples are Golub-Dobrzyń, Krzyżtopór, Wieluń, Krasnystaw, Wawel, Tęczyn, Lanckorona, Pieskowa Skała, Kielce, Sandomierz, Chęciny Niepołomice, Ojców, Wiśnicz, Łobzów, Kruszwica, Rabsztyn.

According to the estimates of Polish scholars I. Ihnatowicz, Z. Landau, A. Mączak and B. Zientara, the invasion by the Swedish army and its allies (Brandenburg-Prussia and Transylvania), resulted in the loss of 25% of the population in four core Polish provinces. Lesser Poland lost 23% of population, Mazovia 40% in villages and 70% in towns, Greater Poland 50% in villages and 60% in towns. Royal Prussia lost some 60% of its population. The Commonwealth's population losses are estimated at between 30% and 50% in 1648–1660.

In January 2013 Marek Poznański, a Palikot Movement member of the Polish parliament, announced his plan to send thousands of postcards to European politicians and journalists, in which he wanted to convince the recipients that Poland should get financial compensation from Sweden for the destruction of the country in the Deluge. Poznański claims that in the 1660 Treaty of Oliwa, Sweden pledged to return all stolen goods, which never happened. The MP had previously intervened at the Polish Ministry of Foreign Affairs and the Ministry of Culture; he also visited the Embassy of Sweden in Warsaw. A businessman from Warsaw, Sławian Krzywiński, joined Poznański, creating the Foundation of Reconstruction of Destruction Caused by the Swedish Invasion (Fundacja Odbudowy Zniszczeń Dokonanych w Czasie Potopu Szwedzkiego). According to Krzywiński, looted goods are still kept in Swedish museums and private collections. Among others, Poland lost the Braniewo Library, works of Nicolaus Copernicus, including the 1543 Nuremberg edition of De revolutionibus orbium coelestium, and the oldest printed text of Bogurodzica. Krzywiński states that as an act of goodwill, the Swedish side should cover the cost of reconstruction of the Rawa Mazowiecka castle, which was destroyed by them in the 1650s.

The population in cities like Warsaw had been reduced to only 10% of its pre-war population of 20,000, and the entire city was razed to the ground, akin to the centuries-after Nazi occupation of the city during World War II. Kraków and Vilnius were also devastated, with their populations being reduced by over half. Additionally, the Polish Gross national product (GNP or GNI) was reduced to 55% of its pre-war levels as a consequence of the Swedish invasion.

=== Effect on the fate of the Commonwealth ===
One of the most notable effects of the devastating Deluge was the subsequent weakening of Poland's international standing. British historian Robert I. Frost (1993) argued that as a result of the Deluge, the Commonwealth began a subsequent period of decline.

Other historians have emphasised other factors in explaining the demise of the Commonwealth. American historican Timothy Snyder (2003) argued that the failure of the Union of Hadiach (1658–1659), which would have made Ukraine (Ruthenia) an co-equal partner with Poland and Lithuania within the Commonwealth (and granting Orthodoxy equality with Catholicism, instead of marginalising it), marked the end of the Commonwealth's golden age of glory, prosperity and toleration that had begun in 1569. British historian Andrew Wilson (2000) similarly argued that the failure to keep Ukraine aboard with the Treaty of Hadiach as "the Commonwealth's eastern pillar [against] Russian expansion" left the Republic exposed to future Muscovite military aggression.

== In popular culture ==
The Deluge had a major effect on Poland, and there are several books describing the war. In 1886 Henryk Sienkiewicz described the Swedish invasion in his novel Роtор. Based on the novel, Jerzy Hoffman directed the film The Deluge (Роtор) in 1974, a classic historical work. It starred Daniel Olbrychski as the character Andrzej Kmicic, a patriot who valiantly fought against the Swedish invasion. The film received a nomination for an Oscar in 1974, but lost to the Italian film Amarcord.

In 2000, Renata Ocieczek wrote the book Czasy potopu szwedzkiego w literaturze polskiej (The time of the Swedish deluge in Polish literature), and in 2006 Jacek Płosiński wrote Potop szwedzki na Podlasiu (Swedish deluge in Podlasie). Other books about this topic include: Warszawa 1656 by Mirosław Nagielski, Krwawy sztorm ("Bloody storm") by Augustyn Necel (describing the Deluge in the region of Kaszuby), Znak Jastrzębca (The sign of the Jastrzębiec) by Stanisław Maria Jankowski, and Pamiętnik oblężenia Częstochowy (The memoir of the siege of Częstochowa), by Father Augustyn Kordecki. Furthermore, James Michener describes the Deluge in his novel Poland (1983). The Deluge has also found its way into video games. The video game Mount & Blade: With Fire & Sword (named after the first book of Sienkiewicz's trilogy) contains a quest called "The Deluge" that is based on the events of the actual Deluge.

== See also ==
- Après nous le déluge (expression)
- The Deluge (novel)
- Kostka-Napierski Uprising
- List of wars between Russia and Sweden
- Northern Wars
- Polish–Swedish wars
- Crimean–Nogai slave raids in Eastern Europe
- Treaty of Hadiach
- Treaty of Oliva
