= Swedish Lithuania =

Baltic dominion of the Swedish Empire (1655–1657)

Grand Duchy of Lithuania Storfurstendömet Litauen (sv) Magnus Ducatus Lituaniæ (la)
- 1655–1657
- Flag Coat of arms

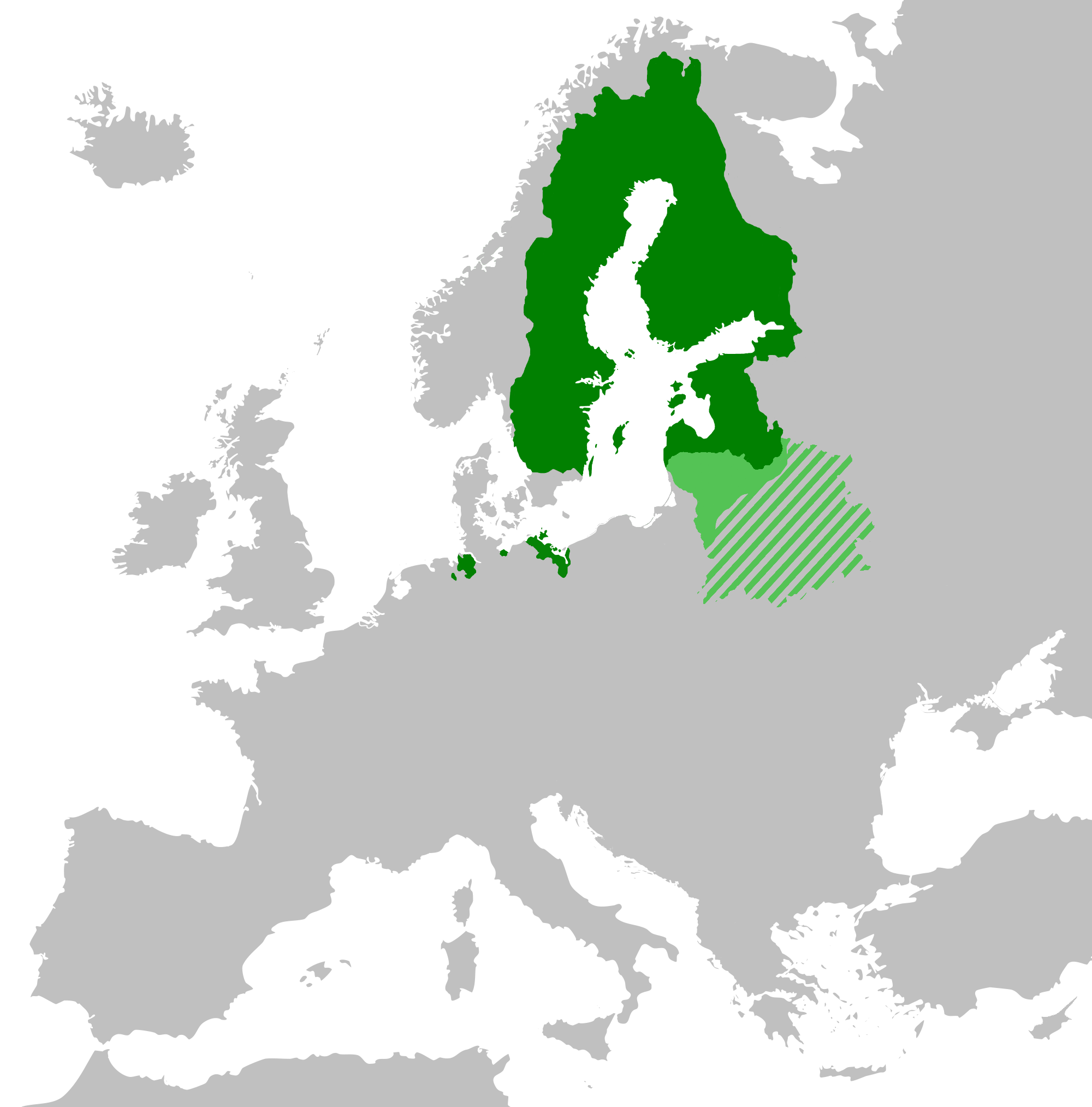
- Swedish Empire (dark green) in 1655–1657 with Lithuania (light green) as its protectorate. Diagonal lines represent territories occupied by the Tsardom of Russia.
- Status: Protectorate of the Swedish Empire
- Capital: Kėdainiai (de facto)
- Common languages: Swedish, Polish, Lithuanian, Ruthenian, (Latin as lingua franca)
- Religion: Lutheranism (officially)
- King / Grand Duke
  - 1655–1657: Charles X Gustav
- Viceroy
  - 1655–1657: Bengt Skytte
- Legislature: Council
- History
  - Conquered by Sweden: 1655
  - Treaty of Kėdainiai: 17 August 1655
  - Union of Kėdainiai: 20 October 1655
  - Disestablished: 1657
| Preceded by | Succeeded by |
| Polish–Lithuanian Commonwealth | Polish–Lithuanian Commonwealth |
- Today part of: Lithuania; Belarus; Poland

Swedish Lithuania, officially known as the Grand Duchy of Lithuania (Swedish: Storfurstendömet Litauen, Latin: Magnus Ducatus Lituaniæ), was a dominium directum protectorate of the Swedish Empire under the rule of King Charles X Gustav in accordance with the Union of Kėdainiai. It de facto existed as an unrecognised entity by neighbouring powers from 1655 until 1657 when it was terminated and fully reincorporated into the Polish–Lithuanian Commonwealth.

== Swedish occupation ==
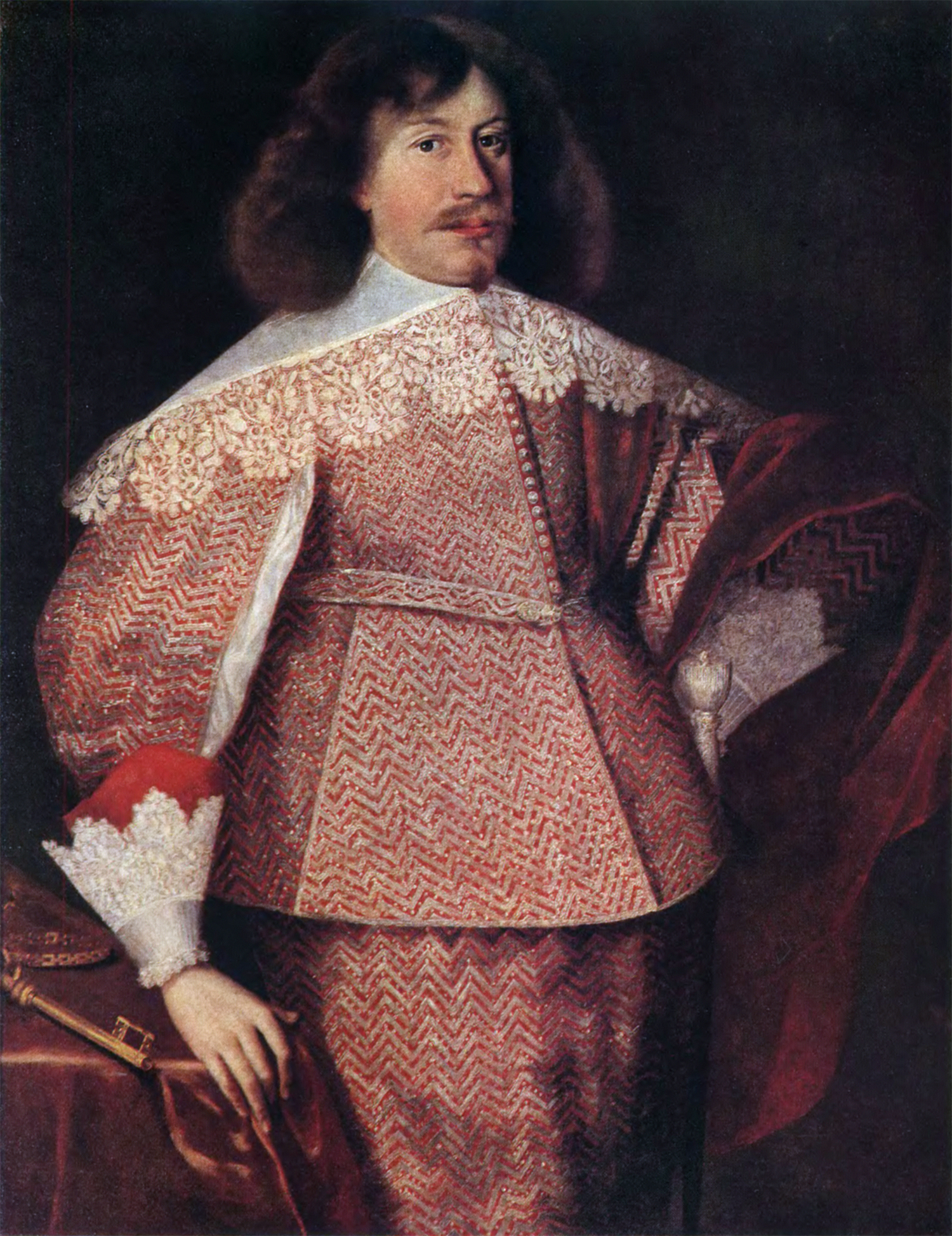
Jonušas Radvila was one of the main initiators of the Swedish–Lithuanian negotiations.

In 1654, the Tsardom of Russia launched its invasion against the Polish–Lithuanian Commonwealth, which resulted in huge swathes of the territory falling into the hands of the Russian army. Noting the weak military performance of the Commonwealth, the Swedish Empire sought to take advantage of the political turmoil and occupy parts of the Polish–Lithuanian state: Sweden wanted to make Lithuania a permanent part of its imperial domain as the territory was strategically important in securing the Baltic Sea from Russia. In the summer of 1655, the Swedish army invaded Western Poland and began threatening to do the same to Lithuania. After learning about King John II Casimir fleeing the country, Lithuanian magnate Janusz Radziwiłł and other members of the Lithuanian nobility began considering negotiations with Sweden. This decision was also influenced by separatist religious motives as it was strongly supported by the Lithuanian Protestant elite. After Sweden's occupation of northwestern Lithuania, commander Zygmunt Przyjemski informed King Charles X Gustav that Poland was willing to formally cede Lithuania to Sweden in exchange for peace – this proposal was rejected.

== Establishment ==
=== Treaty of Kėdainiai ===
On 17 August 1655, feeling betrayed by the lack of military assistance against Muscovy and the Polish surrender at Ujście, Grand Hetman Jonušas Radvila decided to accept Swedish protection and convened more than 400 Lithuanian nobles for the signing of the Treaty of Kėdainiai.^{:12} Such course of action might have also been facilitated by past grievances: in a letter dated 7 April 1655, Jonušas Radvila claimed that Poland had violated the Union of Lublin before, citing the loss of Ukraine and noting that this breach will always be remembered. The treaty laid out certain conditions – the Lithuanian nobility wanted Sweden to protect Lithuania from Moscow, guarantee the country's neutrality in the conflict, political and religious freedoms. Sweden conceded most of the demands, except for matters of sovereignty, as they agreed that the Lithuanian nobility should have a say in matters concerning war and peace, but demurred on securing Lithuania the right to its own separate parliament. The Swedish also avoided directly participating in the conflict with the Tsardom of Russia because, in reality, they didn’t have enough manpower in Swedish Livonia to properly assist Lithuania in case of need. Despite this, Sweden promised Lithuania that it would help them in reclaiming their lost territory.

=== Union of Kėdainiai ===
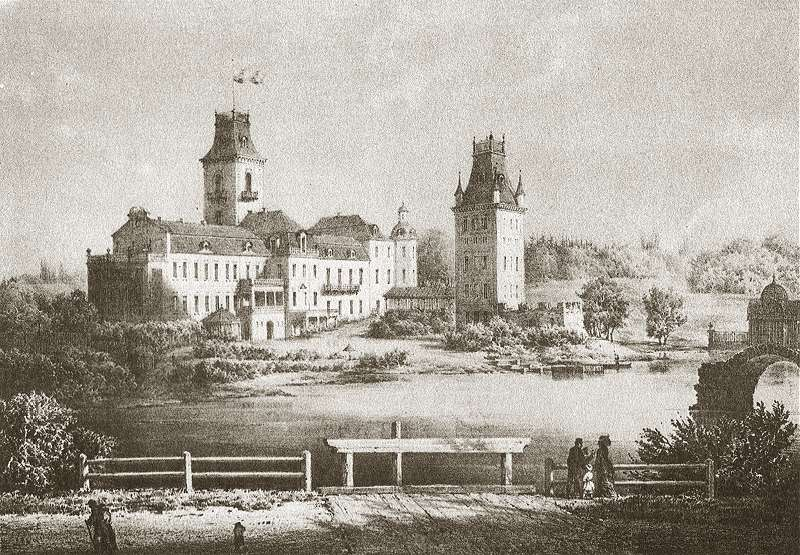
Kėdainiai Manor was where the Union of Kėdainiai was signed.

On 20 October 1655, over 1,000 nobles, mostly from Samogitia, gathered at the Kėdainiai Manor, signed the Union of Kėdainiai on behalf of the Grand Duchy of Lithuania, dissolved the Polish–Lithuanian Commonwealth and solemnly declared the establishment of a personal union with the Swedish Empire. The Swedish side was represented by Lord High Treasurer Magnus Gabriel De la Gardie and Governor Bengt Skytte, with the latter also holding the position of viceroy. King of Sweden Charles X Gustav became Grand Duke of Lithuania.^{:185}^{:14} Following this, another act was signed by which the Lithuanian nobility pledged its loyalty to the Swedish Crown. On 23 October 1655, the Lithuanian Advisory Council was inaugurated.^{:125} Swedish Lithuania was set up as a dominicum directum with Jonušas Radvila being promised exceptional rights to certain estates. It is known that both Jonušas and Boguslavas Radvila (Bogusław Radziwiłł) initially wanted to acquire the Lithuanian territories of Minsk, Navahrudak, Brest Voivodeships and Volkovysk, and Grodno Counties, primarily comprising the territory of present-day Belarus, as well as the Polish Podlaskie Voivodeship. Meanwhile, ethnic Lithuania were to remain under the direct rule of Sweden. Jonušas Radvila also hoped to become an uncrowned ruler of the entire Swedish protectorate, but his endeavour was unsuccessful.

Seeking to improve Sweden’s reputation among the Lithuanian peasantry and secure a greater political advantage over the Lithuanian nobility, Gabriel De la Gardie was entrusted with assuring them the abolition of serfdom. However, this ultimately did not help to improve their relations with the peasantry as they were left with the burden of supplying significant resources to the Swedish forces and their military effort. The Swedish administration began confiscating estates from nobles who did not recognise their authority and set the tax rate to 110 000 thaler – many who refused or were unable to pay them were killed, arrested or deported to Sweden with their property being destroyed. The Livonian field army of 7,200 men^{:91} were moved into the country, with Šiauliai serving as the chief military headquarters and garrisons being stationed across Lithuania proper, including several regiments in Skirsnemunė.^{:60} On 17 January 1656, De la Gardie was officially appointed Governor-General of Samogitia as well as the remaining Lithuania held by the Empire.^{:12} For military purposes, Swedish cartographer Georg von Schwengeln and field marshal Erik Dahlbergh have produced a detailed map of the Kaunas region and southern Samogitia.

== Disestablishment ==
As time passed, some layers of society, namely the minor nobility and peasantry, began to withdraw their support for Swedish rule. This was mostly a consequence of the Swedish administration introducing heavy taxation and its inability to control the brutality of its own army in the region. Baron Samuel von Pufendorf denied this to be the true cause of the unrest, claiming that Jesuits and other Catholics who opposed Protestant rule were the actual culprits behind the hostility.^{:66} In the spring of 1656, certain segments of nobility in Lithuania began revolting against the Swedish. On 6 December 1656, in response to the Polish–Russian peace treaty, King Charles X Gustav gathered a broad coalition of representatives from Lithuania, Prussia, Brandenburg, Transilvania, the Cossacks and signed the Treaty of Radnot, outlining the final partitions of the entire Commonwealth. The envisioned plan was never carried out, however, due to developments on the ground and feuds over assigned spheres of influence. The tide of the conflict turned at the Battle of Prostki, with the Polish decisive victory against the Swedish Empire. On 24–26 January 1657, after prolonged sieges, the Lithuanian–Polish forces captured Biržai and Tykocin Castles, making Sweden and its allies lose control over their strongholds.^{:27} Nonetheless, the fighting persisted and Sweden continued to actively conduct policy in Lithuania until the end of 1657.^{:16} Boguslavas Radvila – who emerged as the factual leader of the Lithuanian Calvinists after the passing of his cousin – commanded the Swedish forces against Poland, faced trial and was exiled to Königsberg. In 1660, with the signing of the Treaty of Oliva, Sweden formally renounced all of its claims in Poland–Lithuania.
