= Battle of Krosno =

1655 battle

Coordinates: 49°41′00″N 21°45′00″E

- Part of the Northern War of 1655–1660 / the Deluge
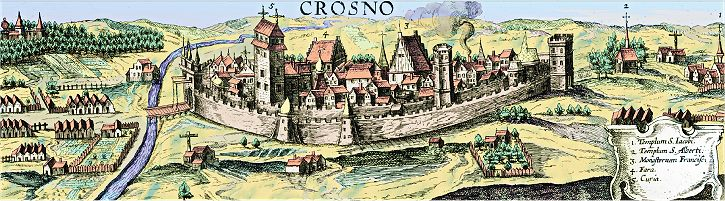
- Engraving of Krosno, 1618
Date	December 7, 1655
Location	Krosno, Poland
Result	Polish-Lithuanian victory

Belligerents
Polish–Lithuanian Commonwealth	Swedish Empire

Commanders and leaders
(Polish–Lithuanian Commonwealth) Gabriel Wojniłłowicz	(Swedish Empire) Aleksander Pracki (executed)

The Battle of Krosno on December 7, 1655. Polish-Lithuanian Commonwealth forces under the command of Gabriel Wojniłłowicz defeated the Swedish forces, supported by their Polish allies under Colonel Aleksander Pracki. The battle was regarded as a symbol of Polish resistance to the Swedes, as it was first Polish victory since the Swedish invasion in the Summer of 1655.

In November 1655, when Swedish forces reached Krosno, the town opened its gates to them. The sejmik of the Przemysl Land, which convened here, pledged allegiance to Charles Gustav. Soon afterwards, however, the residents of Krosno turned against the Swedes, who looted, plundered, murdered people and burned houses. Organized by Colonel Gabriel Wojniłłowicz, they renounced their pledge and attacked the Swedish garrison, together with their Polish allies. The surprised Swedes lost the battle, and the Poles recaptured the town. The people who had pledged allegiance to Charles, together with Pracki, were hanged in the market square, while Wojniłłowicz with his unit headed towards Biecz and Nowy Sącz.
