= Arvid Wittenberg =

Field Marshal of Sweden (1606–1657)

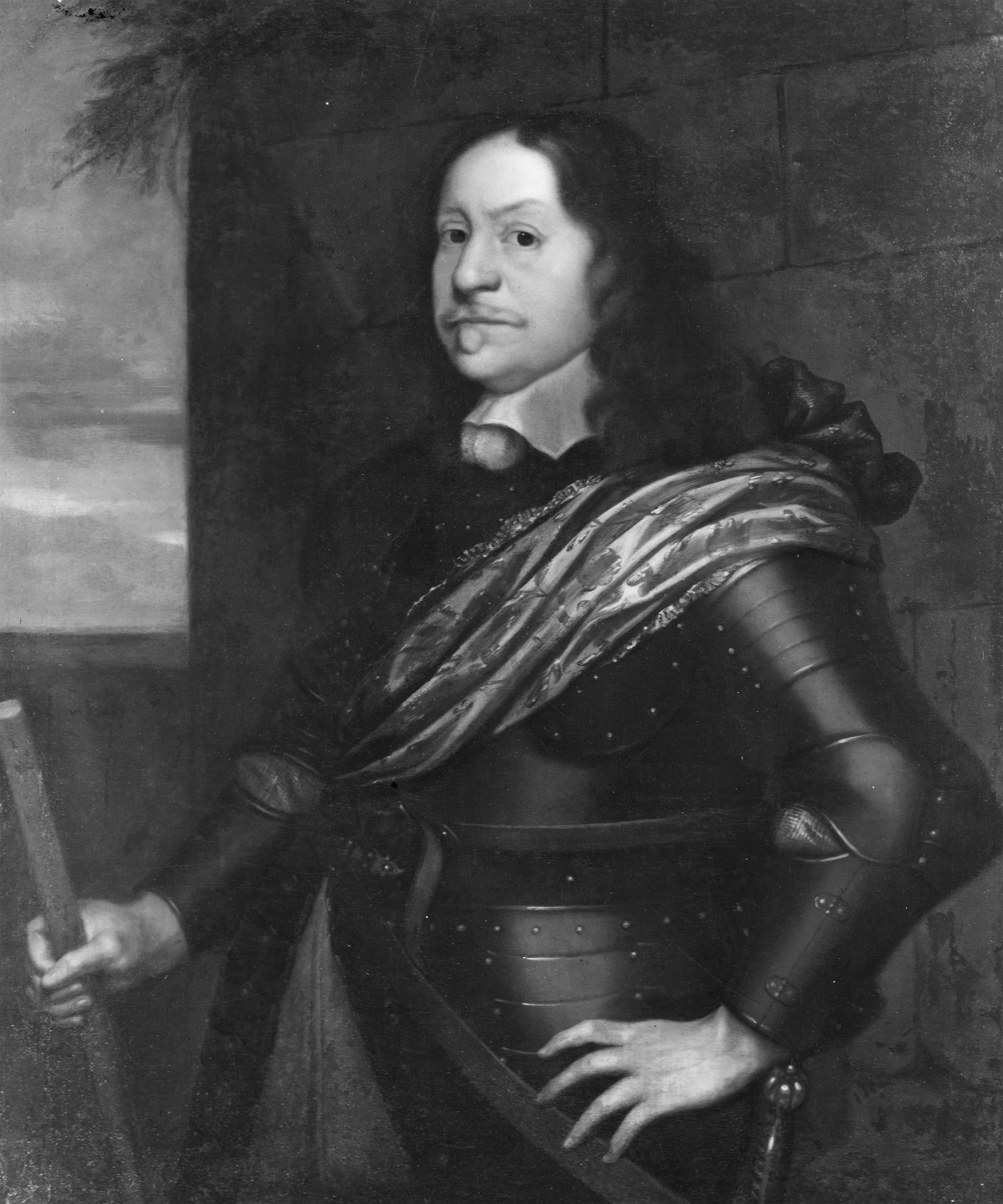
Arvid Wittenberg portrayed.

Arvid Wittenberg or Arvid Wirtenberg von Debern (1606 – 7 September 1657), was a Swedish count, field marshal and privy councillor. Born in Porvoo, Finland, he died imprisoned in Zamość, Poland, 7 September 1657. Arvid Wittenberg preferred to call himself by the original Wittenberg family name, which was Wirtenberg von Debern.

== Life and career ==
Arvid Wittenberg was born on Johannesberg in Porvoo, Finland as a son of the assessor Johannes Wirtenberg von Debern and Magdalena Schönfeld or Magdalena Johansdotter till Skinnarbacka. The title of count was given to Arvid Wittenberg in 1652. He was married twice, with Eva Margareta von Langen from 1642 to her death in 1646 and in 1648 he married Maximiliana Elisabeth von Schönburg.

Arvid Wittenberg began his military career in 1622 and participated as a colonel in the Battle of Nördlingen in 1634. He was captured there but later freed. He then participated in the battles of Wittstock 1636 and Chemnitz 1639 before being promoted to major general. He later came under the command of Lennart Torstenson with whom he participated in the rest of the Swedish campaign in the Thirty Years' War until Torstenson resigned in 1645, including the battles of Breitenfeld 1642 and Jankov 1645, in which he on both occasions commanded the Swedish right flank. He then took command of the Swedish army until the arrival of Carl Gustaf Wrangel.

As Charles X Gustav prepared for Second Northern War, Wittenberg was promoted to field marshal in 1655 and was assigned command of an army of 17,000 men to attack Poland with. He surrounded the Polish army of nobles and forced it to capitulate at Ujście on 25 July 1655, and conquered the voivodships of Poznań and Kalisz. He besieged Kraków, which capitulated 7 October 1655, and forced the Polish commander Koniecpolski and his army to submission. He was given the command of Warsaw which he defended against the Polish army under John II Casimir of Poland until the city was given up 21 June 1656. Contrary to what had been stated in the terms of capitulation, he was placed in prison in Zamość where he later died.

Arvid Wittenberg combined military skills with a hard and cruel treatment of enemies, which made him hated amongst the Poles.

In 1657, after Arvid Wittenberg had died in Polish custody, his son Leonard Johan Wittenberg (born 1646) was accommodated as a ward by Arvid's friend, Carl Gustaf Wrangel. In the summer of 1673, Leonard Johan married Wrangel's daughter Polidora Christiana. Arvid Wittenberg was also the father of Beata Magdalena Wittenberg.

== Sources ==
=== Bibliography ===
- (in Swedish) M. G. S[schybergson] in Nordisk familjebok, vol. 32 (1921), col. 884f.
- Asmus, Ivo (2003). "Das Testament des Grafen. Die pommerschen Besitzungen Carl Gustav Wrangels nach Tod, förmyndarräfst und Reduktion". In Asmus, Ivo; Droste, Heiko; Olesen, Jens E. (eds.). Gemeinsame Bekannte: Schweden und Deutschland in der Frühen Neuzeit (in German). Berlin-Hamburg-Münster: LIT Verlag. ISBN 3-8258-7150-9.
