= Ujście =

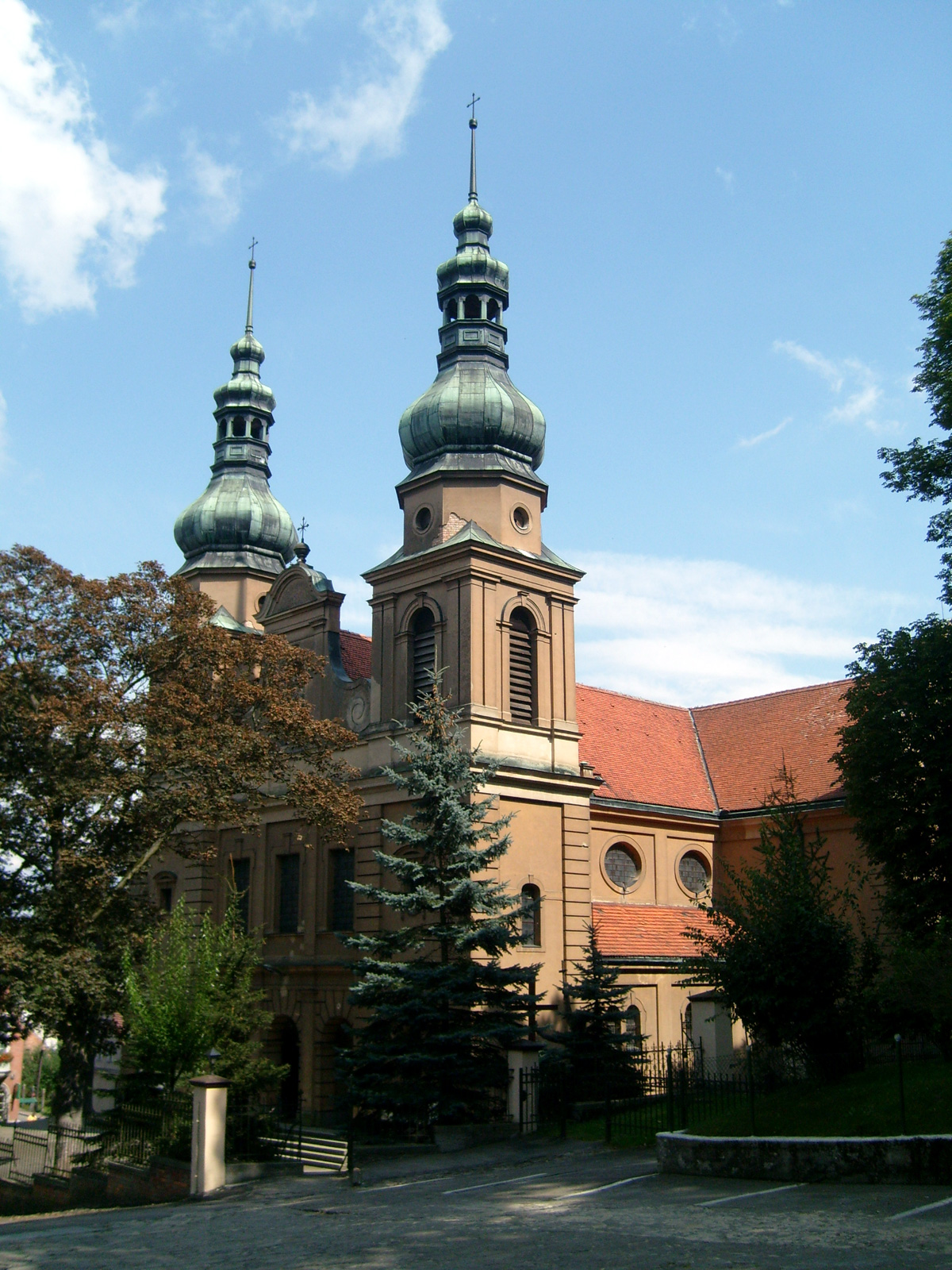
- Church of Saint Nicholas

- Coat of arms

- Location within Poland
- Coordinates: 53°4′N 16°44′E
- Country: Poland
- Voivodeship: Greater Poland
- County: Piła
- Gmina: Ujście

Area
  - Total: 5.78 km^{2} (2.23 sq mi)
- Highest elevation: 98 m (322 ft)
- Lowest elevation: 47 m (154 ft)

Population (2011)
  - Total: 8,134
  - Density: 1,410/km^{2} (3,640/sq mi)
- Time zone: UTC+1 (CET)
  - Summer (DST): UTC+2 (CEST)
- Postal code: 64-850
- Vehicle registration: PP
- Website: http://www.ujscie.pl

Ujście [ˈujɕt͡ɕɛ] is a town in Piła County, Greater Poland Voivodeship, northwestern Poland, with 8,134 inhabitants (2011). It is situated at the confluence of the Gwda and Noteć rivers in the ethnocultural region of Krajna.

== History ==
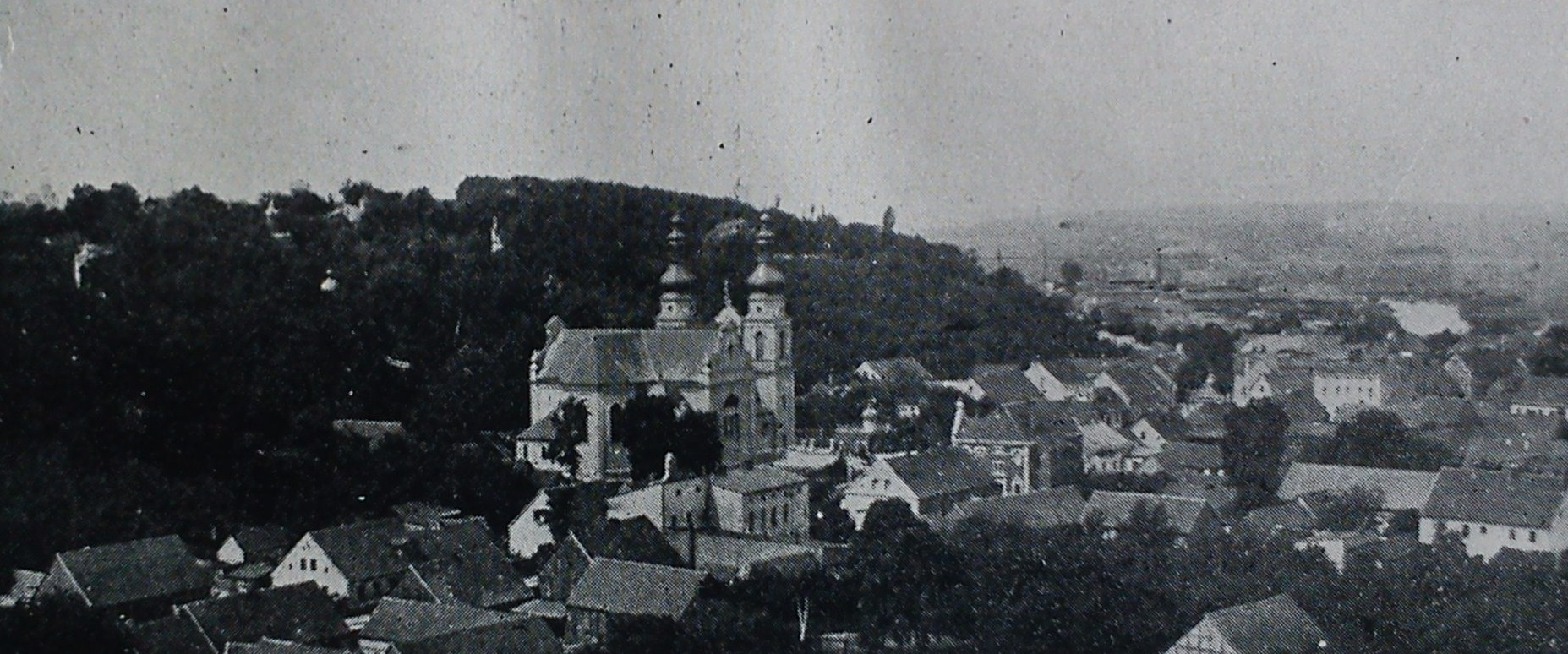
1910 view of the town

Although there was already a stronghold there in the 7th century, the earliest known mention of Ujście comes from the early 12th-century Gesta principum Polonorum chronicle. Its name means "mouth" in Polish, and refers to Ujście being the location of the river mouth of the Gwda. Ujście was a royal town, administratively located in the Poznań County in the Poznań Voivodeship in the Greater Poland Province. In 1655, it was the site of the Battle of Ujście during the Swedish invasion of Poland. In the Second Partition of Poland in 1793, when it was annexed by Prussia, and from 1871 it was part of Germany.

Following the restoration of independent Poland after World War I, in 1920, the town was divided into two parts. The greater part was restored to Poland as the town of Ujście, and a smaller part remained within Germany as the village of Deutsch Usch.

Following the joint German-Soviet invasion of Poland, which started World War II in 1939, the town was occupied by Germany. Local Polish craftsmen were among the victims of a massacre of Poles from the region carried out by the German police in nearby Morzewo as part of the Intelligenzaktion. In 1939–1940, the German police, gendarmerie and Selbstschutz carried out expulsions of Poles, who were deported either to the General Government in the more eastern part of German-occupied Poland or to forced labour in Germany. The Germans also operated a forced labour subcamp of the Stalag II-B prisoner-of-war camp for Allied POWs in Ujście. In 1945, Ujście was entirely restored to Poland and reunited.

== Shrine ==
There is Saint Nicholas Church with a Calvary reminding the Crucifixion of Jesus.
