= Andrzej Rottermund =

Art historian (born 1941)

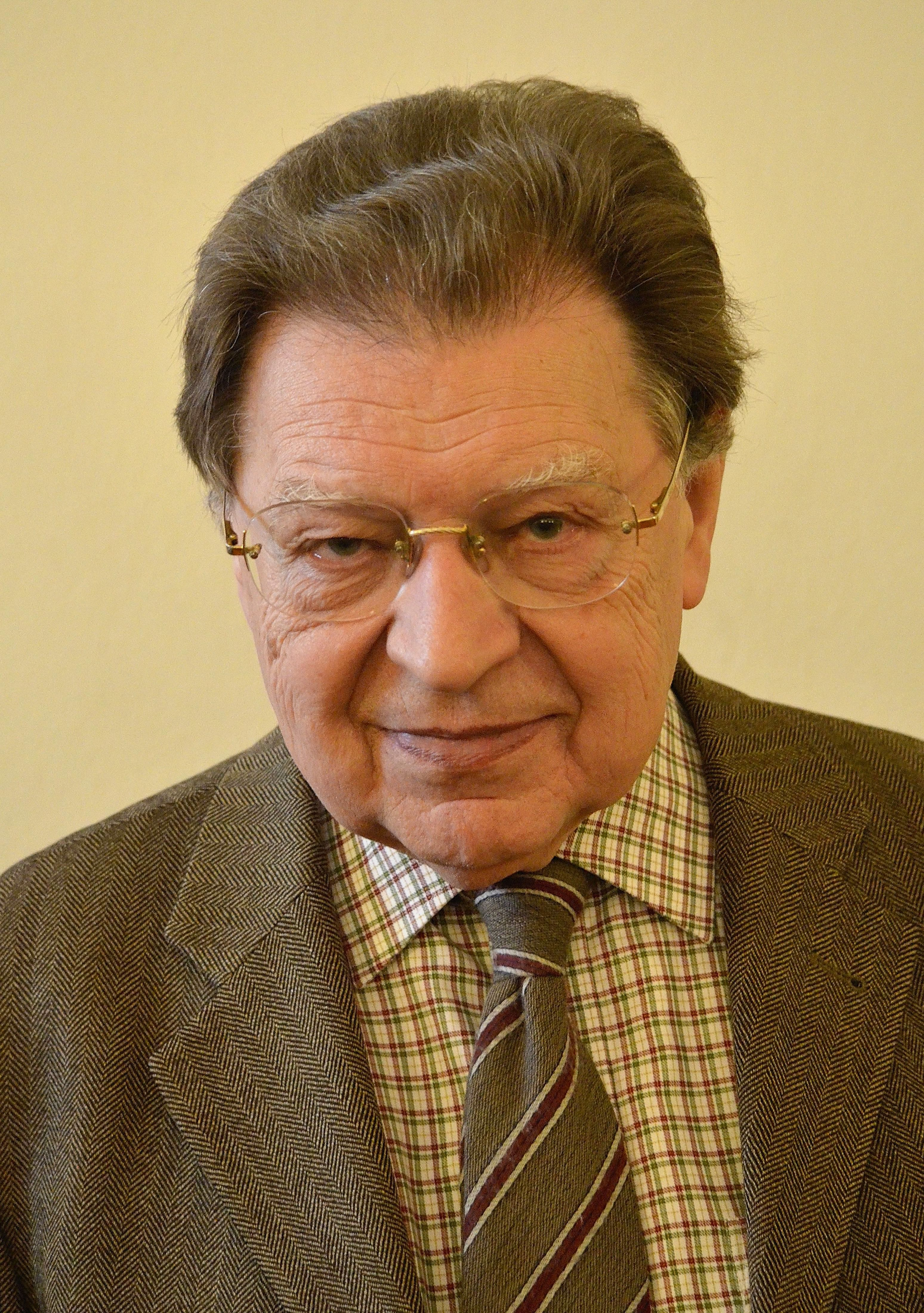
- Rottermund in 2016
- Born: 11 May 1941 (age 85); Warsaw, Poland
- Occupations: Art historian, museologist
- Known for: Director of the Royal Castle in Warsaw (1991–2015)
- Awards: Order of Polonia Restituta (Officer's Cross, 1994; Commander's Cross, 1998; Grand Cross, 2011), Bene Merito honorary distinction (2012), Professor Aleksander Gieysztor Award (2024)

Academic background
- Education: University of Warsaw

Academic work
- Discipline: Art history
- Institutions: Royal Castle in Warsaw

Andrzej Rottermund (born 11 May 1941) is a Polish art historian and museologist who is a member of the Polish Academy of Sciences. He served as director of the Royal Castle in Warsaw from 1991 to 2015 and as chairman of the Polish Committee for UNESCO from 2011 to 2015.

== Biography ==
In 1964, Rottermund earned a master's degree in art history from the University of Warsaw. He later supervised four doctoral dissertations. He was chosen a member of the Warsaw Scientific Society.

Rottermund's academic work has focused on modern and nineteenth-century art and culture, court ceremonial and its relationship to art, the work of Bernardo Bellotto, the architectural history of Warsaw, particularly the Royal Castle in Warsaw, as well as museology, collecting, and museum architecture.

From 1975 to 1982, he served as deputy director of the National Museum in Warsaw. He participated in the reconstruction of the Royal Castle in Warsaw, serving as a member of its Architectural Commission from 1973 and as curator of the Royal Castle Branch from 1973 to 1976. In 1987, he became deputy director of the Royal Castle in Warsaw. He served as president of the Association of Art Historians from 1987 to 1991. In 1991, he was appointed Undersecretary of State at the Ministry of Culture and Art.

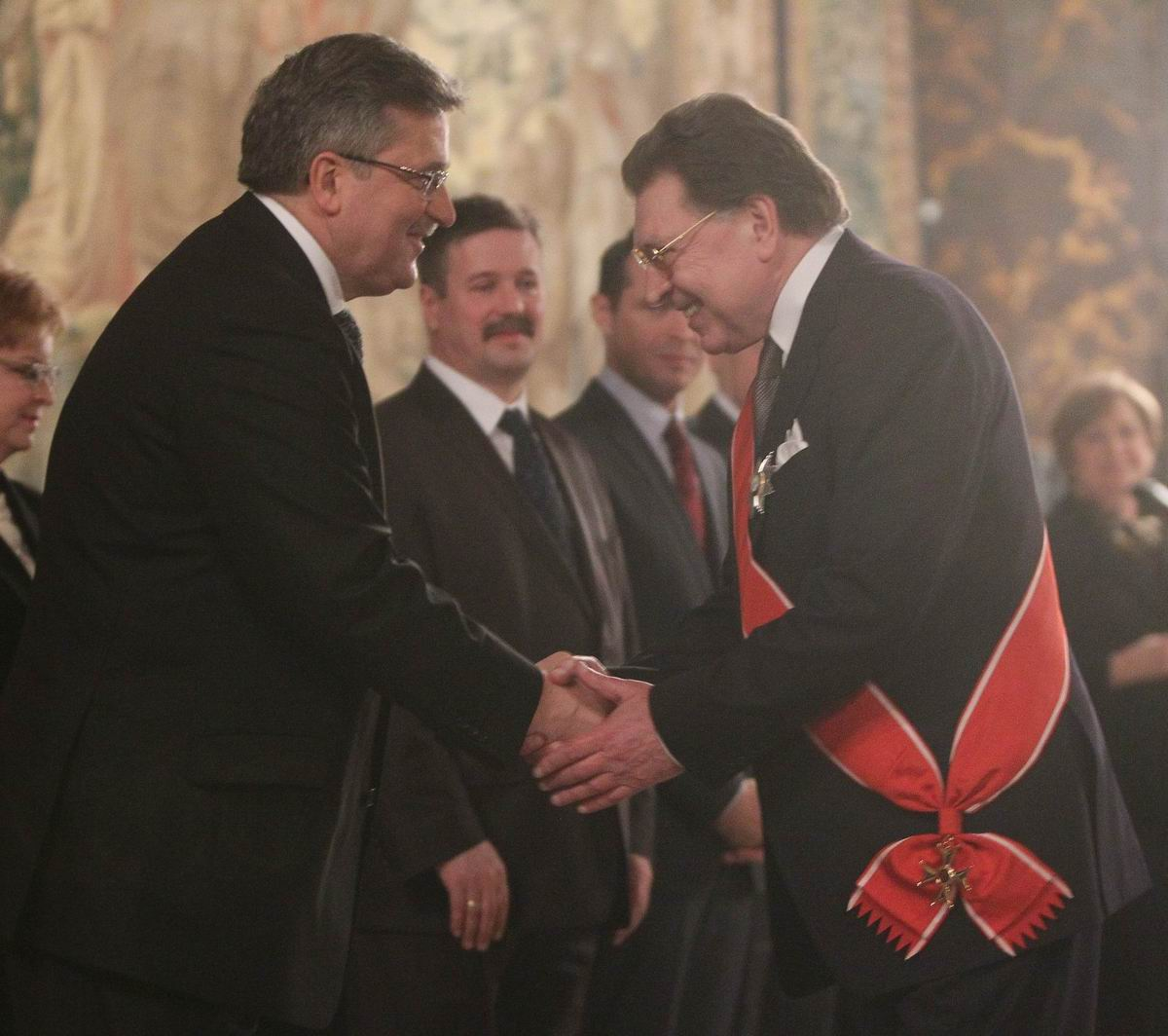
Andrzej Rottermund (right) with President Bronisław Komorowski during a state ceremony in 2011.

== Works ==
Year	Title
1970	Katalog rysunków architektonicznych ze zbiorów Muzeum Narodowego w Warszawie
1989	Zamek Królewski – funkcje i treści rezydencji monarszej wieku Oświecenia
1990	J. L. N. Durand a polska architektura I połowy XIX wieku
1993	Rozwój przestrzenny Warszawy
2005	Od Wenecji do Warszawy (życie i twórczość Bernarda Bellotta zw. Canalettem)

== Awards and honours ==
- Officer's Cross of the Order of Polonia Restituta (1994)
- Commander's Cross of the Order of Polonia Restituta (1998)
- Grand Cross of the Order of Polonia Restituta (2011)
- Bene Merito honorary distinction (2012)
- Honorary Citizen of Warsaw (18 June 2020)
- Professor Aleksander Gieysztor Award (2024)
- Gold Gloria Artis Medal for Merit to Culture
- Medal of the Commission of National Education

== Bibliography ==
- "Prof. dr hab. czł. koresp. PAN Andrzej Rottermund". Nauka Polska.
- "Prof. dr hab. Andrzej Rottermund". Royal Castle in Warsaw. 2015. Archived from the original on 21 October 2021.
