= Battle of Prostki =

Battle in the Second Northern War

Coordinates: 53°41′56″N 22°25′58″E

Battle of Prostken
- Part of the Deluge (Second Northern War)
| Date | October 8, 1656 |
| Location | Prostken, Duchy of Prussia (present-day Prostki, Ełk County, Poland) |
| Result | Polish–Lithuanian–Tatar victory |

Belligerents
| Brandenburg-Prussia; Swedish Empire; Swedish Lithuania | Polish–Lithuanian Commonwealth; Crimean Khanate |

Commanders and leaders
| (Margraviate of Brandenburg) Georg von Waldeck; Bogusław Radziwiłł (POW) | (Polish–Lithuanian Commonwealth) Wincenty Gosiewski; Subhan Ghazi Agha |

Strength
| 4,000; 9 artillery pieces | 8,000 |

Casualties and losses
| 1,500 Swedes killed and captured Brandenburgers losses are unknown 9 artillery pieces | 200–250 killed and wounded |

The Battle of Prostki was fought near Prostki (German: Prostken), Duchy of Prussia (today in Ełk County, Poland) on October 8, 1656, between forces of the Polish–Lithuanian Commonwealth and allied Crimean Tatars commanded by hetman Wincenty Gosiewski on one side, and on the other allied Swedish and Brandenburg forces commanded by Prince Georg Friedrich of Waldeck, reinforced by the cavalry of Prince Bogusław Radziwiłł. The Commonwealth forces won the battle, annihilating enemy forces and taking Radziwiłł captive.

== Background ==
In the late summer of 1656 Swedish and Brandenburgian armies left Warsaw, retreating towards the northwest. Polish-Lithuanian commanders then decided to invade the Duchy of Prussia, which had been a vassal state to the Kingdom of Poland and which, as Brandenburg-Prussia, had been an ally of the Swedish Empire (see Treaty of Königsberg (1656). The objective of the invasion was to make “The Great Elector”, Frederick Wilhelm, end the alliance with Sweden.

Polish-Lithuanian forces were commanded by Lithuanian Field Hetman Wincenty Korwin Gosiewski. They were supported by a unit of Crimean Tatars, under Subchan Ghazi Aga. All together Gosiewski’s army had some 8,000-10,000 men (including 2,000 Tatars). In early October 1656 it crossed the Narew River, either near Łomża or Wizna, and headed northwards to Lyck (Ełk).

Prussian commandant Prince Georg Friedrich of Waldeck concentrated his forces near Wąsosz. His army had probably 3,500 men, mostly reiters and dragoons. Waldeck reached Prostken (Prostki) on October 6 and camped on the eastern bank of the Ełk River, near a bridge that he planned to defend. He also got in touch with Bogusław Radziwilł, whose cavalry unit of 800 was stationed in Rajgród. Furthermore, additional Prussian units were stationed at some distance from Lyck. Upon hearing of the invasion, they set off to help Waldeck, but only some 1,000 men reached Prostken before the battle. A unit of 2,000 men and 12 cannons left Lyck on October 8, which was too late.

== Battle ==
On the morning of October 8 first Tatar and then Polish-Lithuanian units reached the village, while main forces were some two hours behind them. Gosiewski, who enjoyed numerical superiority over the enemy, decided to make the Prussians abandon their positions behind the river and destroy them in an open field. At the same time, he sent Tatars towards Lyck to face the Prussian reinforcements.

In the first stage of the battle Polish-Lithuanian pretended to retreat after an initial clash. This worked, as the Prussians crossed the river, while Waldeck, upon receiving news of Tatars, sent a cavalry unit of 500 towards Lyck. This unit was reinforced by the cavalry of Bogusław Radziwiłł, which soon afterwards clashed with the Tatars.

When the main Polish-Lithuanian force attacked the Prussians, Waldeck ordered his troops to return behind the river. Gosiewski attacked the Prussians, forcing them to retreat. Meanwhile, the Tatars crossed the Elk and attacked the camp. Soon afterwards they were joined by the Commonwealth forces. The unit of Bogusław Radziwiłł was completely destroyed, while Radziwiłł himself was captured. Prince Waldeck, with 500 soldiers, managed to escape, as the Tatars, Poles and Lithuanians were too busy looting the Prussian camp. Altogether, the battle lasted approximately five hours.

== Aftermath ==
After the victory Gosiewski sent a letter to Frederick Wilhelm, urging him to abandon the Swedes. The Great Elector rejected this, which resulted in widespread looting and destruction of the southeastern corner of the Duchy of Prussia, together with the neighboring Polish counties of Wizna and Rajgród. Gosiewski then marched with his army to Lithuania, while the Tatars returned to Crimea.
