= Treaty of Kėdainiai =

1655 treaty between Sweden and Lithuania

Treaty of Kėdainiai (Kiejdany)
- Type: Legal status of the Grand Duchy of Lithuania
- Signed: 17 August 1655
- Location: Kėdainiai, Lithuania
- Signatories: Charles X Gustav of Sweden; Janusz II Radziwiłł
- Parties: Swedish Empire; Grand Duchy of Lithuania

The Treaty of Kėdainiai or Kiejdany (Lithuanian: Kėdainių sutartis, Josvainių aktas; Swedish: Fördraget i Kėdainiai), signed on 17 August 1655, was a Swedish–Lithuanian agreement during the Second Northern War. After the Polish forces had been decisively defeated in the Battle of Ujście in which the Poznań and Kalisz palatines surrendered to Sweden, Lithuanian hetman Janusz Radziwiłł decided to discontinue the war. In Kėdainiai, he accepted Swedish protection.

The treaty specified also that the Polish–Lithuanian Commonwealth was not dissolved and that Lithuanian forces would not fight Polish forces, but the text of the treaty included protests of the lack of Polish support. On 20 October, the treaty was superseded by the Union of Kėdainiai, which united the Grand Duchy of Lithuania with the Swedish Empire.
