= Battle of Ujście =

Battle between Poland-Lithuania and Sweden; Swedish victory

- Part of the Northern War of 1655–1660 / The Deluge
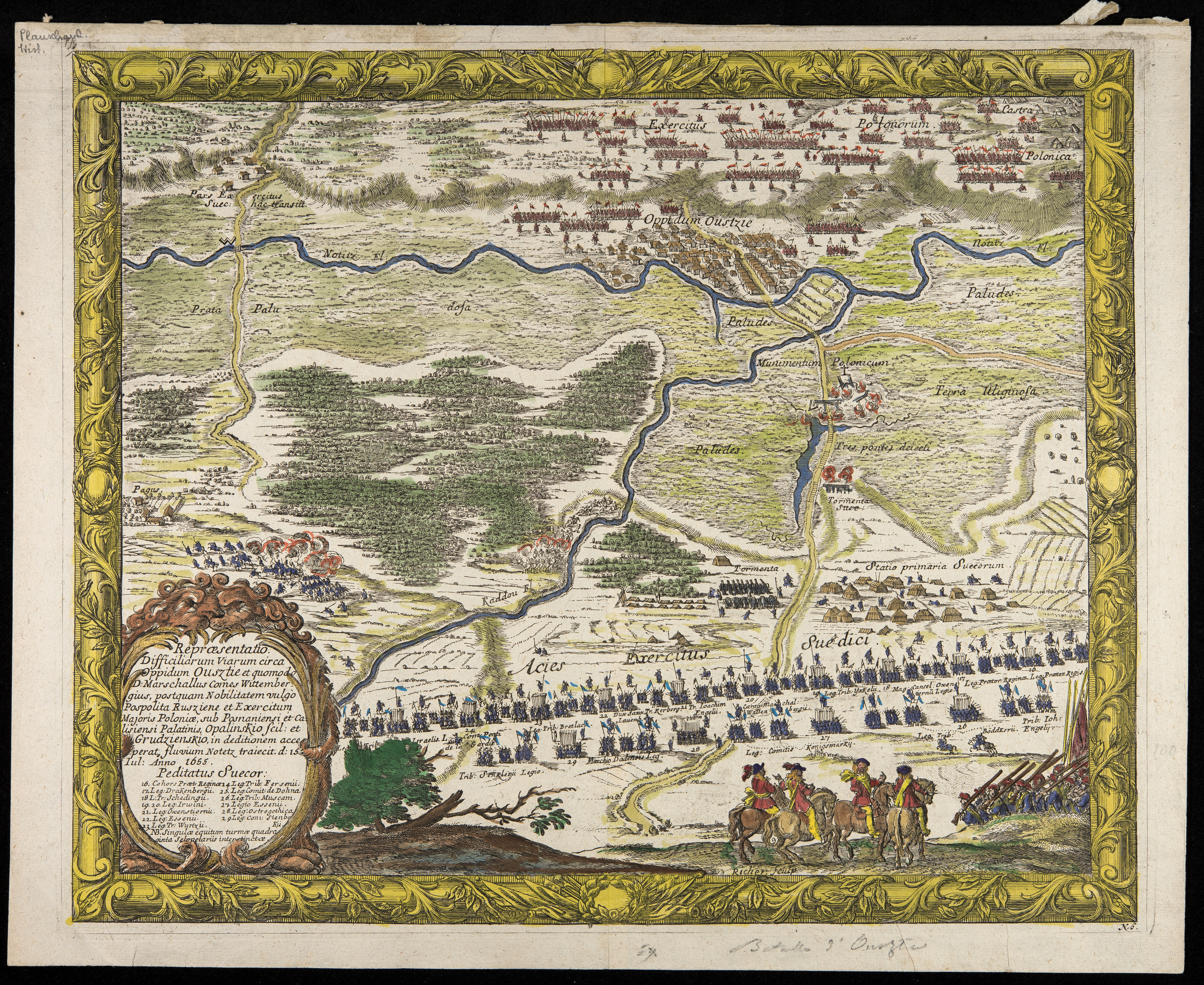
- Battle of Ujście by Erik Dahlberg, 1655
Date	July 24–25, 1655
Location	Ujście
Result	Swedish victory
Territorial changes	Greater Poland becomes Swedish ally

Belligerents
Swedish Empire	Polish–Lithuanian Commonwealth

Commanders and leaders
(Swedish Empire) Arvid Wittenberg	(Polish–Lithuanian Commonwealth) Krzysztof Opaliński (surrendered) (Polish–Lithuanian Commonwealth) Andrzej Grudziński (surrendered)

Strength
7,500 (infantry); 6,150 (cavalry); 72 cannon	14,400 (13,000 pospolite ruszenie and 1,400 infantry)

The Battle of Ujście was fought on July 24–25, 1655 between forces of the Polish–Lithuanian Commonwealth commanded by Krzysztof Opaliński and Andrzej Grudziński on one side, and on the other Swedish forces commanded by Arvid Wittenberg. Krzysztof Opaliński and Bogusław Leszczyński, dissatisfied with policies of King John II Casimir of Poland, decided to become Swedish allies together with the pospolite ruszenie (Levée en masse) of Greater Poland to Charles X Gustav of Sweden.

== Introduction ==
In the summer of 1655, the Swedish Empire invaded the Polish–Lithuanian Commonwealth, entering Poland–Lithuania from Swedish Pomerania and Swedish Livonia. On July 5, 1655, Arvid Wittenberg concentrated his forces near Stettin, and marched towards the Polish border. He was faced by the Levée en masse from the province of Greater Poland. Polish forces were made of local szlachta (nobility), which had not experienced any major military conflicts, and was unprepared to fight professional Swedish army, which was largely based on mercenaries, veterans of the Thirty Years' War.

Wittenberg's army of 17,000 crossed Polish border near Czaplinek, on July 21. Polish forces, concentrated near Ujście consisted of 13,000 nobility, plus 1,400 chosen infantry. The Poles were supposed to be commanded by Bogusław Leszczyński, who feigned illness and left to Breslau. In the absence of Leszczyński, the command was shared by Voivode of Poznań Krzysztof Opalinski, and Voivode of Kalisz, Andrzej Karol Grudziński. Their task was to defend the Noteć river crossings before the arrival of main forces, commanded by King John II Casimir.

== Battle ==
On July 24, Wittenberg's army reached Ujście, urging Polish forces to capitulate. After the refusal, Wittenberg placed his artillery opposite Polish trenches, and began a barrage. For five hours, the chosen infantry defended bridges over the Noteć and the Gwda rivers, retreating after running out of ammunition. At the same time, Swedish cavalry unit managed to capture a bridge near Dziembowo. Facing encirclement, Polish leaders decided to negotiate. Furthermore, panic broke out in Polish camp.

== Capitulation ==
On the next day, July 25, Polish leaders signed capitulation, pledging allegiance to the Swedish king. Among the dignitaries who signed the act were such names, as Voivode of Poznań Krzysztof Opalinski, Voivode of Kalisz Andrzej Karol Grudzinski, Castellan of Międzyrzecz Pawel Gembicki, Castellan of Krzywin Maksymilian Miaskowski and Andrzej Słupecki. After the pact, Greater Poland's nobility, which stayed at the Ujście camp, was invited by the Swedes to a feast.

According to the document signed by the Poles, Charles X Gustav was given complete control of the two Greater Poland's voivodeships, together with all church and royal properties, royal towns (Poznań, Kalisz, Kościan, Międzyrzecz), and royal castles. The nobility was granted guarantee of its freedoms (see Golden Liberty), and only Poles were to be nominated to the posts of civil servants.

== Consequences ==
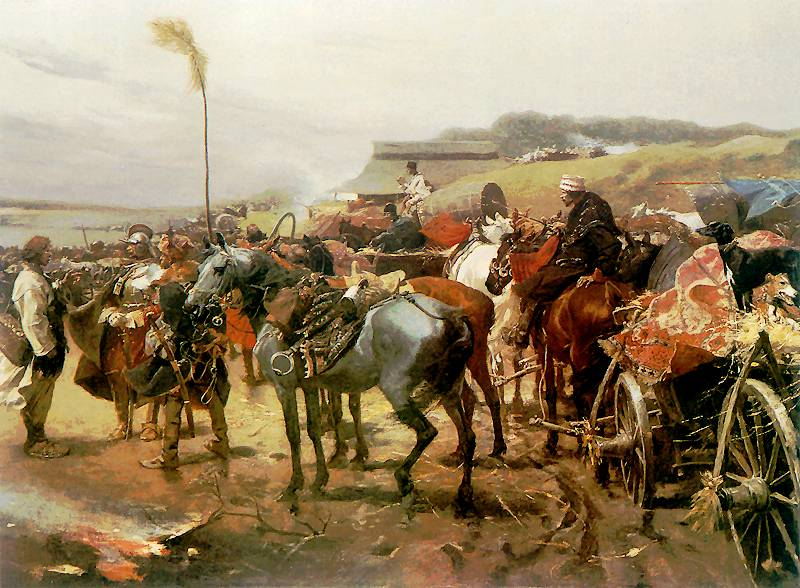
Retreat of the Poles by Józef Brandt

The capitulation, which took place after a short battle, opened to the Swedes the way towards defenceless central Poland. Wittenberg however headed south west, to Poznań, which he captured without fighting on July 31. In early August he camped near Środa Wielkopolska, awaiting the arrival of the army commanded by Charles Gustav.

News of the capitulation reached Warsaw on July 31. Shaken and desperate Polish King John II Casimir urged Austrian Emperor for help. Furthermore, on August 2 John Casimir expressed his willingness to hand the Polish crown over to Emperor Ferdinand III.

The Battle of Ujście is now regarded in Poland as a symbol of treason. Politician and publicist Piotr Naimski wrote in his essay "Zaczęło się pod Ujściem" ("It all began at Ujście") that the source of the national weakness of the Poles lies at Ujście:

"Before 1655, all cases of treason were severely punished. After the meeting with Swedes, where a group act of treason took place, its participants were not condemned. Furthermore, they were later allowed to return to Poland, and to participate in public life (...) It was after Ujście that collaboration and treason emerged as one of possible choices in the so-called "decent families". It was not only the Swedish invasion in itself that undermined Polish statehood. It also was the weed of treason, which was allowed to take root and with which we still struggle".

Polish historian Józef Szujski described the events at Ujście in the following way:

"The year 1655 brought a shameful renunciation of the Polish crown by King John II Casimir. This was a symbolic confirmation of the fact that the idea of a state, the idea of a monarchy, the allegiance to the government, was deeply undermined. The tragic cycle of invasions began with capitulation and treason of Greater Poland's levée en masse. Despite the convenient, defensive position of the Ujście camp, despite numerical superiority, the nobility gathered at Ujście decided to negotiate with Wittemberg and traitor Hieronim Radziejowski, accepting the protectorate of Charles Gustav".
