= Gosiewski =

Gosiewski (feminine Gosiewska) is a Polish surname. Notable people include:

- Aleksander Korwin Gosiewski, Polish nobleman and military commander
- Beata Gosiewska, Polish politician
- Bogusław Korwin Gosiewski, Bishop of Smoleńsk
- Jack Gosiewski, Australian rugby footballer
- Jerzy Gosiewski, Polish politician
- Krzysztof Korwin Gosiewski, Polish nobleman and politician
- Małgorzata Gosiewska, Polish politician
- Przemysław Gosiewski, Polish politician
- Tadeusz Gosiewski, Polish lawyer and diplomat
- Teresa Korwin Gosiewska, Polish noblewoman
- Wincenty Korwin Gosiewski, Polish nobleman and general
- Zygmunt Gosiewski, Polish boxer

The Gosiewski are also two aristocratic families of Poland:

- Gosiewski (Korwin) family of Korwin coat of arms originating from a Knight of the clan Korwin, Lord of Gosiewo (Gosie or Gosie Leśnica), near Zambrów
- Gosiewski (Ślepowron) family of Ślepowron coat of arms originating from a Knight of the clan Ślepowron, Lord of Gosie or Gosiewo, near Różan
