= Korwin coat of arms =

Polish coat of arms

Korwin
- Alternative name(s): Corvus, Corvinus, Corvin, Kruk, Bujno, Ślepowron odmiana (derivative) Korwin
- Earliest mention: 1224 as Bujno or Ślepowron royal Grand Duke; 1490 as Korwin proper 1526 in the Land of Cracow and Sandomiers
- Cities: Głogów, former Duchy of Głogów now Lower Silesian Voivodeship, Zwoleń County former Duchy of Masovia now Masovian Voivodeship, Baisogala nowadays a small town in Lithuania
- Families: 218 names

Korwin is a Polish coat of arms. It was used by several noble families in the times of the Kingdom of Poland and the Polish–Lithuanian Commonwealth and by the Russian Counts Korwin-Litwicki tracing their origin back to Empress Catherine the Great.

== History ==
The raven is a prominent symbol in Polish heraldry, most notably associated with the Ślepowron heraldic clan. Heraldic tradition often attributes the symbol to the clan's ancient origins, with some theories suggesting that the motif predates the Christianization of Poland and the rise of the Piast dynasty. These potential pagan roots are frequently cited by historians to explain the symbol's presence in Polish armorials prior to the full establishment of Western chivalric customs.

Historically, the raven motif is documented in a 1224 grant of privilege issued in Warsaw by Duke Konrad I of Masovia to Wawrzęta (also identified as Wawrzyniec or Lawrence) Korwin of Ślepowron. This event is recorded in the works of several prominent heraldic historians and chroniclers, including Jan Długosz, Bartosz Paprocki, and Count Juliusz Ostrowski.

While the Ślepowron clan is considered indigenous to Poland, heraldic scholars generally distinguish it from the Korwin "proper" variant. The latter is widely understood to have been introduced to Poland from Hungary approximately two centuries later, eventually becoming associated with the original Ślepowron lineage through later genealogical and heraldic developments.

The Roman-Hungarian legend of Korwin starts in the 16th century under the influence of Renaissance humanism culture and vivacious contacts between Polish nobility and Hungarian Royal Court. In that kingdom, the Wallachian-Hungarian family of Korvin had flourish in 1400, and a baroque legend argues them descending from one of the Roman gens Valerii. At one time there was in Rome a distinguished tribune named Marcus Valerius Corvus, a Roman general who got the agnomen Corvinus in the following manner: In 349BC, the Roman Army moved against the Barbarians, and before the battle began, a warrior of great size and strength came forward and challenged anyone in the Roman cavalry to single combat, whereupon Valerius stepped forward. Just as he was about to engage the barbarian, a raven flew from a trunk, perched upon Valerius's helmet, and began to attack his foe's eyes with its beak so fiercely that the warrior was blind. With this, the Roman beat him easily, and from that time, Valerius was called Corvinus (from Corvus, "raven"). His descendant, Marcus Valerius Messalla Corvinus (64BC – 8AD) was chosen to the Roman consulate with Caesar Augustus and the Baroque authors understand he became a big landowner in the Dacian-Pannonian frontiers. If however any of his supposed Hungarians descendants, and a Polish branch of this family carried on the name, nobody really knows...

It is true that Janos Hunyadi and his son Matthias Corvinus Hunyadi, King of Hungary and anti-king of Bohemia, called themselves "Corvinus" and had their coins minted displaying a “raven with a ring”. The epithet Corvinus was coined by Matthias' biographer, the Italian Antonio Bonfini, who claimed that the Hunyadi family descended from Marcus Valerius Corvinus.

The Hungarian legend relates that when a raven carried off the ring King Matthias had removed from his finger he chased the bird down and slew him retrieving the ring, and in commemoration of this event, he took the raven as a symbol for his signet sign. Really, this coat of arms was used by Matthias's ancestors far earlier than he did. His own father John Hunyadi, voivode of Transylvania and regent of Hungary, is known as Ioannes Corvinus in Medieval Latin. In addition the Silesian Annals (other version of this legend) tell that was not the king himself who shot the raven but a Polish soldier, who was rewarded with the Korwin coat of arms. Matthias Corvinus was also ruler of the Duchy of Głogów, and as titular Bohemian king (and as conqueror most of territory of the Bohemian Crown), suzerain of all Silesian duchies.

Actually, Matthias Corvinus raised the Black Army which is recognized as the first standing continental European fighting force not under conscription and with regular pay since the Roman Empire. The soldiers of the Black Army were mainly Bohemian mercenaries (former Hussites), but Poles, Teutons, Hungarians and adventurers from all over Europe joined as well. Sometimes officers were rewarded with lands and ennoblement. This may be a more realistic origin of the Korwin coat of arms, in Silesia at first (part of the Bohemian kingdom), and all around the Polish–Lithuanian commonwealth later. In time, baroque authors related the old Slepowron coat of arms with then more "fashionable" name Korwin.

Korwin coat of arms can be found on the tombstone of the Chancellor of Cracow Academy Łukasz Noskowski (also Łukasz of Noskowa; †1532), buried in St. Mary's Basilica, Kraków. Image of a raven also appears on the city seal of Głogów from March 17, 1490. A raven sitting on a branch was the emblem of the Corvinus/Korwin family, which ruled in the Duchy of Głogów in the second half of the 15th century and gave their emblem to the city.

== Blazon ==
Gules, on a cut off tree stump laid sideways proper, between two upper and two lower knots stands a left facing raven sable, in its beak, a ring or with the diamond facing down. In the crest, above a crowned helmet, there are three ostrich feathers.

- The book of Polish families coats of arms. Vol. 2, p. 150/151 photo 076, DjVu format in the Warsaw University e-library by Count Juliusz Ostrowski (Translation from the Polish original: Księga herbowa rodów polskich. Cz. 2)

"Korwin I sometimes known as Ślepowron variation - In a red field, a black raven is facing left with a gold ring in its beak; it stands on a natural tree-stump, lying crosswise with two knots on top and two on the bottom. Over the helmet and the coronet are three ostrich feathers.
It’s one of the oldest Polish coats of arms, but neither Długosz nor official records from the fifteenth century tell about it. Prof. Małecki writes this coat of arms is separated from the Ślepowron only in the first decades of the sixteenth century (at the beginning, only Paprocki treated these two heraldic emblems as separates). Proof this fact some families that later used Korwin coat of arms but in the fifteenth century were still considered to be in Ślepowron clan, (Kochanowski family, for example). The name Ślepowron referred to the emblem, and the battle cry or call was Bojno or Bujno, as it’s proved in official records. Korwin coat of arms, being a later emblem, had no call."

"Korwin II – Reversing the figures is a common tool in Polish heraldry, which doesn’t follow the general principles of the Western heraldry; there is also an inverted Korwin facing right (instead of the usual drawing facing left). Niesiecki himself mentions it."

"Korwin III – In a red field there is a black raven with a gold ring in its beak, over a cut stump lying across, between two knots on each side. Above the helmet and the coronet there is the same raven with a ring. There are similarities between the crest of this variation and the crest of Ślepowron coat of arms."

== Families ==
=== A ===
Abramik

=== B ===
Bachowski, Bagiński, Barański, Baszucki, Benkowski, Berengowicz, Bieńkowski, Bierzyński, Bieżyński, Binkowski, Boczkowski, Botowic, Botowicz, Bronicki, Bujalski, Bujnowski, Bujwid (royal Grand Duke), Bunkowski, Buynowski

=== C ===
Cetnerski, Chłędowski, Chromecki, Chrzanowski, Chyczewski, Czarnolaski, Czopowski

=== D ===
Dabkowicz, Dalkowicz, Danisewicz, Danisiewicz, Dmochowski, Dobkiewicz, Doliński, Drozdowski-Meloch, Droziński, Dudorowicz, Dudrewicz, Dunaj, Dworakowski, Dzbański, Dzięcielski

=== F ===
Filiborn,

=== G ===
Gacki, Gadzki, Gącki, Gąsiorowski, Gęsicki, Ginwił, Ginwiłł, Ginwiłłowicz, Gładyszewski, Gosiewski, Gronostajski, Grosman, Grozmani, Grudzina, Gutowski

=== H ===
Haraziński, Hollo, Hrudzina

=== J ===
Jachimowicz, Jagodyński, Jagodziński, Jagusiński, Jagużyński, Jahodyński, Jahołkowski, Jakimowicz, Jastrzębski, Jaszewski, Jawdyński

=== K ===
Kaftanowski, Kalinowski, Kamianowski, Kamiański, Kaminowski, Kamionowski, Karłowicz, Kilarski, Kirbut, Klimowski (royal Count), Kłosieński, Kłosiński, Kochanowicz, Kochanowski, Kojrowicz, Komar, Komoński, Korotkiewicz, Korwin, Korwin-Litwicki, Kowina, Korwin-Piotrowski, Kosakowski, Kossakowski, Kossenda, Kostecki, Koszulko, Koyrowicz, Kozniecki, Krasiński, Kręczow, Krompach, Kropiwnicki, Kruczaj, Kruczkowski, Kruk, Krukowicz, Krukowski, Krupicki, Kunachowicz, Kurkowski (royal Count)

=== L ===
Lipczyński, Lisowski, Lissowski, Losniewski, Lutostański

=== Ł ===
Łośniewski

=== M ===
Maleczyński, Malenczyński, Maliszkiewicz, Małaciewski, Małaczeński, Małaczewski, Małaczyński, Małęczyński, Metelski, Michalski, Mietelski, Milewski (royal Count) Młodnicki, Moczulski, Moczydłowski, Morzkowski, Mroczkowski (royal Count)

=== N ===
Niskiewicz, Nowicki

=== O ===
Odelski, Odolski, Olszewski (royal Count)

=== P ===
Pannenko, Pawłowski, Pczycki, Perkowski, Pieślak, Piotrowski, Pluszczewski, Pluszczowski, Pluta, Pluto, Płuszczewski, Podgurski, Podrez, Polski, Prendowski, Prędowski, Proniewicz, Proniewski, Przełomiński, Przyłuski, Ptuszczewski, Pusz

=== R ===
Roszkowski

=== S ===
Sakiewicz, Sakowicz, Sarnacki, Sarnewicz, Seredyński, Skirwin, Słobodziński, Smolak, Sobierajski, Sobolewski, Sołkowski, Sozański, Starzyński, Sujkowski, Surwiłło, Suykowski, Syrunowski, Syrunowicz, Syrun (royal Count) Szawroński, Szawrowski, Szczefanowicz, Szuwalski, Szwaroński, Szwedowicz, Szwedowski, (royal Count)

=== Ś ===
Świderski-Bałaszewicz (royal Count)

=== T ===
Tołokiewicz, Topczewski, Truskolaski, Truskolawski, Truskoleśny (royal Count)

=== U ===
Upnicki (royal Count)

=== W ===
Wakar, Wałejko, Wasilowski, Wasiłowski, Wendrychowski, Wędrychowski, Wierzbicki, Wojszyński, Wolimer, Wolmer, Wołejko, Wołk, Womer, Woronowicz, Woronowski, Wronowicz, Wróblewski, Wyszkowski, Wyżewski, Wzderski

=== Z ===
Zaniwicki, Zawistowski, Zbożniakiewicz, Zienkowski

=== Ż ===
Żarnowiecki, Żorawski, Żórawski, Żyliński.

== Notable bearers ==
- Łukasz Noskowski z Noskowa (15th/16th century) Chancellor of the Cracow Academy.
- Jan Kochanowski, (16th century) Poet and writer.
- Aleksander Korwin Gosiewski (17th century) Voivode of Smolensk.
- Wincenty Korwin Gosiewski (17th century) Field-Hetman of Lithuania.
- Zuzanna Korwin Gosiewska (17th century)
- Teresa Korwin Gosiewska (17th century)
- Bogusław Korwin Gosiewski (17th century) Bishop of Smolensk.
- Krzysztof Korwin Gosiewski (17th century) Voivod of Smolensk.
- Maciek Korwin Gosiewski (17th century) General of the Lithuanian artillery.
- Szymon Marcin Kossakowski (18th century) Last great hetman of Lithuania (also see Ślepowron coat of arms; both of this coats of arms used by Kossakowski family).
- Ludwik Kochanowski (19th century) Baron.
- Maria Piotrowska (Bielecki) Countess
- Karolina Proniewska (19th century) Poet and translator
- Sofia Kovalevskaya (Korwin-Krukowskaya) (19th century) Scientist from Russia.
- Wojciech Prendowski (19th century) Chairman of the nobility.
- Bogumiła Bronisława Prendowski (19th century)
- Julia Dworakowska (1782–1844)
- Władysław Seredyński (19th century)
- Eliza Orzeszkowa (1842–1910), novelist.
- Janusz Korwin-Mikke (born 1942), politician
- Maja Lidia Kossakowska ( 1972–2022), fantasy writer

== Variations ==
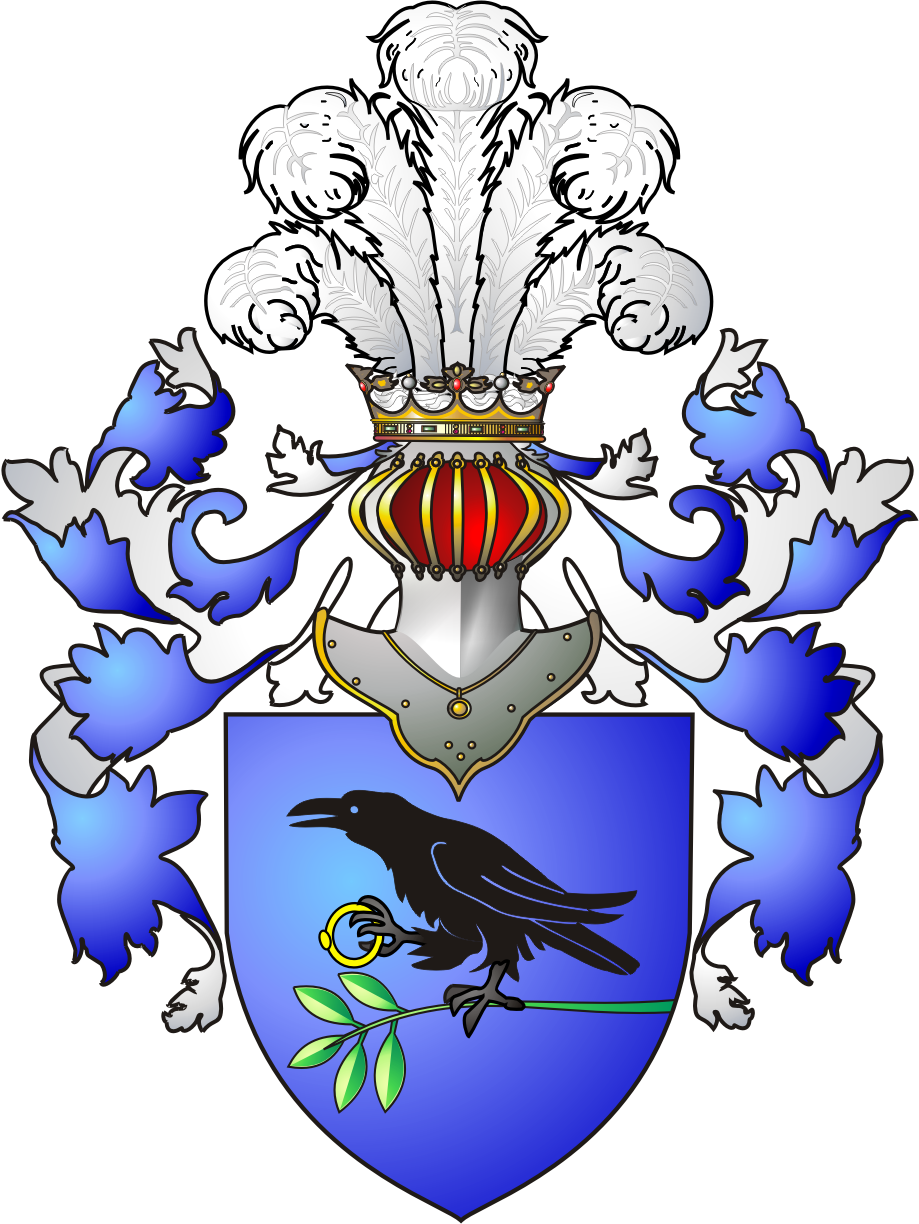
The Materna Coat of Arms

The Bieńkowski Coat of Arms

The Przykorwin Coat of Arms

Sources disagree if the Sandrecki Coat of Arms is derived from the Korwin or the Ślepowron coat of arms

Korwin II coat of arms. Variation (odmiana)

Korwin III coat of arms. Variation (odmiana)

Korwin coat of arms with alternative crest, after Zygmunt Gloger's Encyclopedia staropolska old drawing. Remark the Ślepowron like raven on crest

Korwin Jaguschinski count (Germanization. Perhaps Jagodyński, Jagodziński, Jagusiński, Jagużyński or Jahodyński)

Baisogala coat of arms. Clearly, the Korwin/Ślepowron seal at the city coat of arms

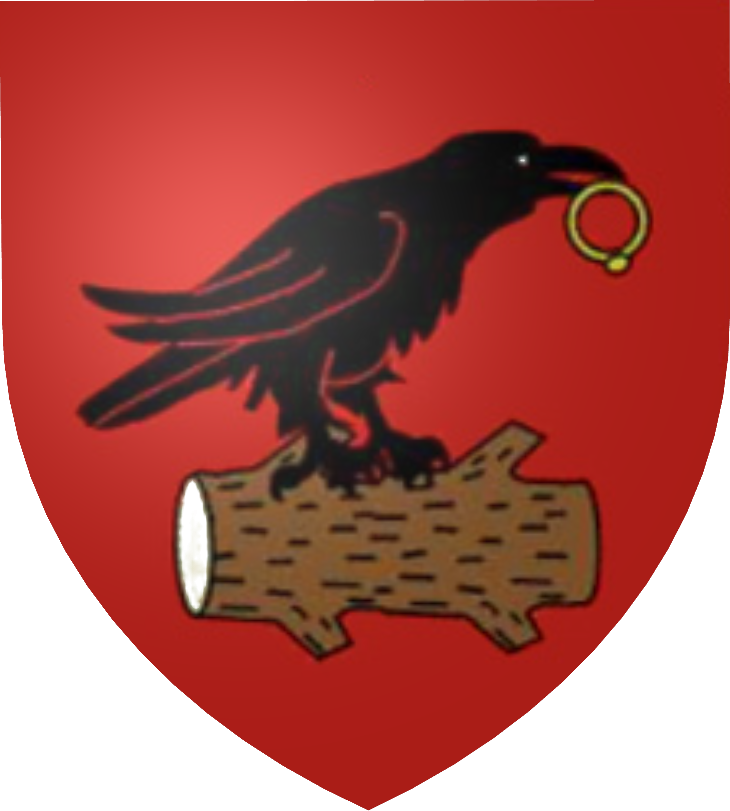
Coat of arms of Korwin - Escutcheon

== Gallery ==
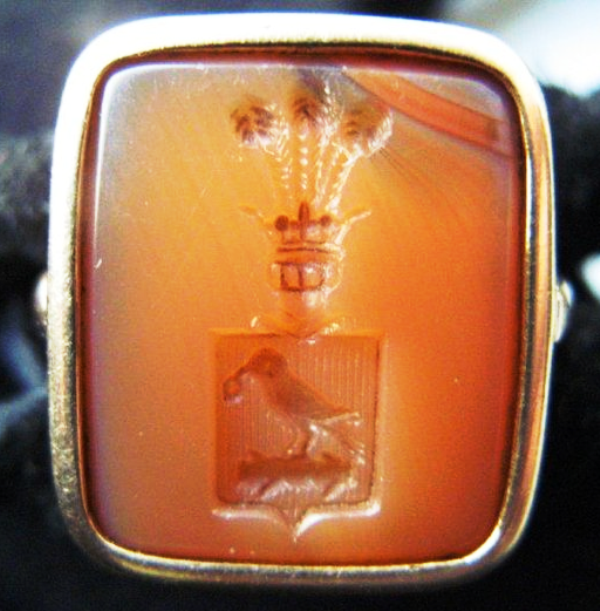
Korwin coat of arms on Polish signet ring

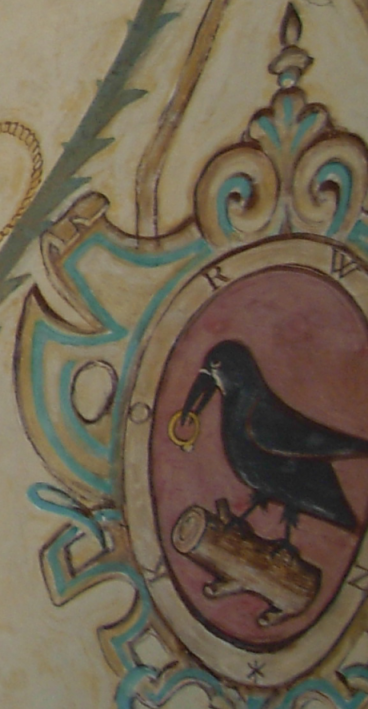
Korwin coat of arms in Baranów Sandomierski Castle

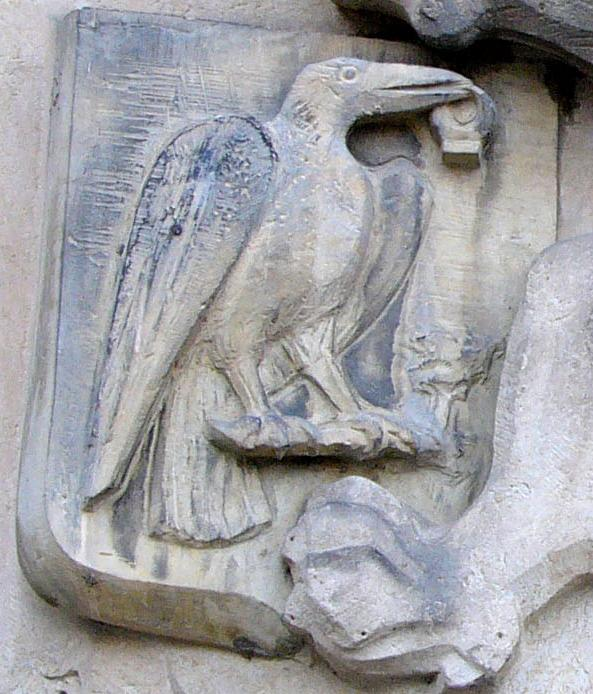
Coat of arms of Matthias Corvinus in Olomouc, Moravia

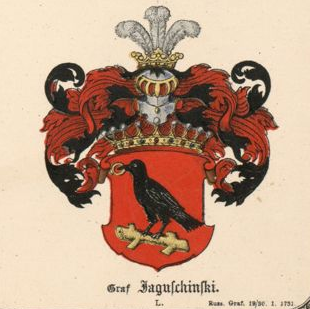
Count Jaguschinski’s Korwin coat of arms (Germanization; perhaps Jagodyński, Jagodziński, Jagusiński, Jagużyński or Jahodyński), Polish Nobleman, entitled as Count in the Russian empire in 1731; according to the Baltic Armorial by Carl Arvid von Klingspor

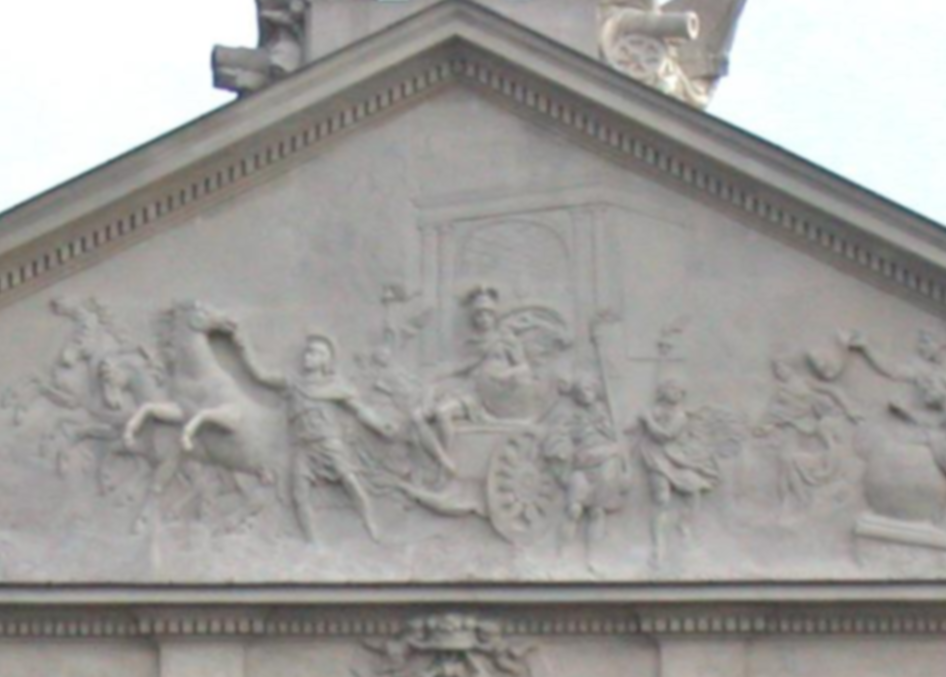
The triumph of Marcus Valerius Corvinus in the pediment of the Krasiński Palace in Warsaw

Coat of arms of Głogów. The raven appears on the city's seal on 17 March 1490. When the Corvinus ruled the Duchy of Glogów, they granted their crest to the city

Coat of arms of Zwoleń County. Over the S (Latin initial for Svolen) is a raven which honors Jan Kochanowski of Korwin, landowner in this county (Czarnolas)

== See also ==
- Heraldry
- Coat of arms
- Polish heraldry
- Armorial of Polish nobility

== Literature ==
- Mănescu, Jean-Nicholas: Das Oswaldussymbol in der Wappenwelt Osteuropas. Tom C. Bergroth (edited): Genealogica & Heraldica. Report of The 16th International Congress of Genealogical and Heraldic Sciences in Helsinki 16–21 August 1984. Helsinki 1984, p. 415-424. ISBN 951-99640-4-5
