= Gosiewski family =

Polish noble family

Ślepowron coat of arms of the Gosiewski family

Gosiewski (plural form: Gosiewscy; feminine form: Gosiewska) is the surname of a Polish noble (szlachta) family whose members gained prominence in the Grand Duchy of Lithuania during the period of the Polish-Lithuanian Commonwealth.

== History ==
The Gosiewskis had roots in Łomża Land, and in the 15th–16th centuries owned properties in Mazovia and Podlachia. It seems the Gosiewski family (or Gąsiewski in old times), originates from a Knight from the Ślepowron heraldic clan, Lord of Gosie or Gosiewo, near Różan. Their estate had an area of about 9 km², and contained villages: Modzele, Ogony, part of Młynarze (Mlynarze) village between the road and Narew River, part of Kruszewo village (south part of village and terrains up to Chełsty or Chelsty). Generally the estate contained quite big terrain from Chełsty to Różan. After they became also owner of a part of a village Mroczki-Kawki Many Gosiewskis still live in Chełsty and the surrounding area. Two of the most representative members of the family were Aleksander Korwin Gosiewski, Palatine-Governor of Smolensk, Speaker of the Parliament and commander of the Polish garrison of the Moscow Kremlin. His son Lithuanian Field Commander Wincenty Korwin Gosiewski was a supporter of a strong and centralized royal power, limiting Liberum veto and a variation about how the King should be elect call Vivente rege. They were two of the most powerful and influential officers in the Grand Duchy of Lithuania of the 17th century.

The family features on the list of legitimized nobility of Congress Poland.

== Coat of arms ==
This Gosiewski family used the Ślepowron coat of arms. There are three other Gosiewski families entitled to use Korwin, Jastrzębiec coats of arms and a derivative arms named Gosiewski, according to Tadeusz Gajl's armorial.

== Notable members ==
- Aleksander Korwin Gosiewski (died in 1639), Palatine-Governor of Smolensk, Speaker of the Parliament and commander of the Polish garrison of the Moscow Kremlin
- Zuzanna Korwin Gosiewska (died in 1660), properly Princess Sapieha, wife of Prince Mikołaj Krzysztof Sapieha
- Wincenty Korwin Gosiewski (1620–1662), Field-Commander of Lithuania
- Maciej Korwin Gosiewski, (died in 1683) General of the Lithuanian artillery
- Teresa Korwin Gosiewska (died in 1708), properly Princess Sapieha wife of Prine Jan Kazimierz Sapieha the Younger, Palatine-Governor of Vilnius and Lithuanian Great-Commander
- Krzysztof Korwin Gosiewski (died in 1643), Palatine-Governor of Smolensk
- Bogusław Korwin Gosiewski (1660–1744), bishop of Smolensk
- Wiktor Korwin Gosiewski (1890–1936), military (member of the underground Polish Military Organisation) and Senator of the Republic of Poland.
- Tadeusz Gosiewski (1900–1969), diplomat
- Przemysław Gosiewski (1964–2010) was a Polish politician and a deputy chair of Law and Justice (Prawo i Sprawiedliwość) party. In years 2006–2007, he served as a Deputy Prime Minister of Poland in Jarosław Kaczyński's government.
- Małgorzata Gosiewska (born 1966), Polish politician, Przemysław Gosiewski’s widow, Law and Justice (Prawo i Sprawiedliwość) party member
