= Mikołaj Sapieha =

Mikołaj Sapieha may refer to several nobles from the Sapieha family:

- Mikołaj Sapieha (died 1599) (before 1545 – 1599), voivode of Minsk, Brest Litovsk, Vitebsk
- Mikołaj Sapieha (1581–1644), known as "Pious", voivode of Minsk, Brest Litovsk
- Mikołaj Sapieha (1588–1638), voivode of Minsk, Nowogrodek
- Mikołaj Krzysztof Sapieha (1613–1639), Field Notary of Lithuania
- Mikołaj Leon Sapieha (1644–1685), voivode of Bratslav
