= Bierzyński =

Bierzyński, feminine Bierzyńska is a Polish surname associated with the Korwin coat of arms and Jastrzębiec coat of arms. It is a toponymic surname associated with any of the places name Bierzyn. Notable people with the surname include:

- Józef Bierzyński (died 1791), general commander of the united voivodeships and lands, marshal of Sieradz of the Bar Confederation in 1769, starost of Pereyaslav in 1780
- Józef Kajetan Bierzyński (1746-1805?), Polish nobleman
- Stanisław Bierzyński, original owner of the Tereschenko Palace, now in Ukraine
