= Niszcz coat of arms =

Polish coat of arms

Niszcz
- Battle cry: Niszcz
- Earliest mention: 1683
- Cities: Węgrów

Niszcz (Polish pronunciation: [ˈɲiʂt͡ʂ]) is a Polish coat of arms attributed to the Niszcz family, a minor szlachta lineage associated with the town of Węgrów in the historical region of Mazovia during the period of the Polish–Lithuanian Commonwealth.

== History ==
The history of the Niszcz family is intrinsically linked to the broader narrative of the Mazovian nobility and the Ślepowron heraldic clan. Emerging as a distinct lineage in the early modern period, the family established its prominence in the Podlachia and Masovian regions. They are historically noted as one of the noble families that held ownership of the private town of Węgrów, sharing this distinction with prominent magnate houses such as the Kiszka, Radziwiłł, and Krasiński families.

The family's foundational myth is rooted in the Sarmatian tradition of the Polish–Lithuanian Commonwealth, where the nobility traced their origins to the ancient warrior tribes of Rome and Sarmatia. The Niszcz lineage claims descent from the Roman tribune Marcus Valerius Corvus. According to the clan's ancestral legend, Valerius accepted a challenge to single combat from a Gaulish giant. During the duel, a raven descended from the heavens, perching on Valerius's helmet and distracting his foe by pecking at his eyes, thereby securing a Roman victory.

During the Renaissance, this classical legend was embraced by the Niszcz family to legitimize their social standing. By asserting this ancient pedigree, they distinguished themselves from the skartabellat, framing their lineage not merely as ennobled burghers, but as heirs to the martial virtues of classical antiquity. This connection was further reinforced by the family's participation in the local sejmiks and their patronage of the Basilica of the Assumption in Węgrów.

== Blazon ==
Gules, a horseshoe argent ensigned by a cross pattée or, thereon a raven rising sable, wings addorsed and inverted, holding in the beak an annulet or, gemmed gules.

Out of a ducal coronet or, a plume of five ostrich feathers argent.

== Notable bearers ==
- Walenty Niszcz (1644–1717), a Polish nobleman.
- Leokadia Niszcz (1896–1978), a Polish philanthropist.
- Antoni Niszcz (1909–1991), a Polish industrialist.
- Romuald Niszcz (1936–2010), a Polish physicist.

== See also ==
- Polish heraldry
- Coat of arms
- Heraldry
- Armorial of Polish nobility
