= Wincenty Korwin Gosiewski =

Polish nobleman and general (c. 1620 – 1662)

- Field Hetman of Lithuania; Grand Treasurer of Lithuania
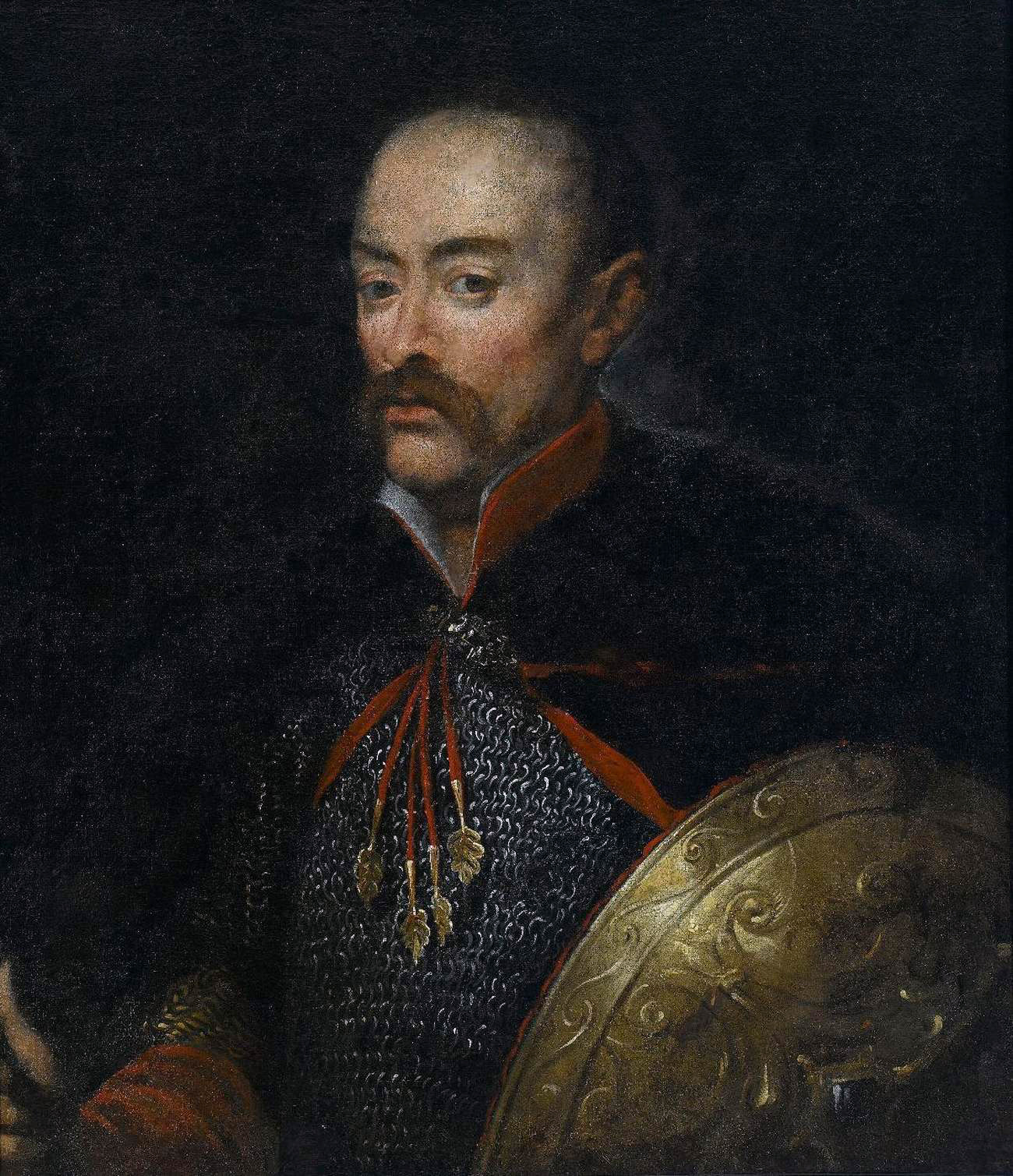
- Portrait by an unknown artist. It is believed that it might depict Wincenty's father, Aleksander.
- Coat of arms: Ślepowron
- Born: c. 1620; Wołczyn, Brest Litovsk Voivodeship, Grand Duchy of Lithuania, Polish–Lithuanian Commonwealth
- Died: 29 November 1662 (aged 41–42) near Ostrynia, Polish–Lithuanian Commonwealth
- Noble family: Gosiewski
- Consort: Magdalena Konopacka h. Konopacki
- Issue: Zofia Korwin Gosiewska; Teresa Korwin Gosiewska; Karol Korwin Gosiewski
- Father: Aleksander Korwin Gosiewski h. Ślepowron
- Mother: Ewa Pac h. Gozdawa

Wincenty Aleksander Korwin Gosiewski de armis Ślepowron (c. 1620 – 29 November 1662) was a Polish–Lithuanian nobleman and general.

He was the Lithuanian Field Hetman from 1654, Grand Treasurer of Lithuania and Lithuanian Great-Quartermaster from 1652, Lithuanian General of the Artillery from 1651, Grand-Master of the Pantry of Lithuania from 1646 (honorary court title).

== Biography ==
=== Early life and first battles ===
After his father Aleksander, he became District-Governor of Puńsk and Markava, after his brother Krzysztof he became also District-Governor of Velizh. Speaker of the Parliament in Warsaw from 21 to 24 December 1650. He came from the noble family Gosiewski of the Ślepowron coat of arms. He was Aleksander Gosiewski's son, Palatine-Governor of Smolensk. He married Magdalena Konopacka, Elbląg Castle-Commander's daughter. He graduated from the Vilnius University and studied in Vienna, Padua and Rome. After returning home he was appointed by King Władysław IV Vasa Grand Master of the Pantry of Lithuania; fulfilling this office he signed the document electing John II Casimir Vasa.

He began his military service as commander of the regiment that fought in 1648 under the leadership of the Grand Lithuanian Hetman Janusz Radziwiłł. In July 1649 as Janusz Radziwiłł's deputy commander in chief, he had a major part in defeating the troops of the Zaporozhian Cossacks in the Battle of Loyew. As Lithuanian Artillery General in 1651, at the Battle of Chernobyl, he succeeded against Cossack troops commanded by colonels Antonov and Adamowicz. He participated as a Commissioner in the peace talks that led to the agreement of Bila Tserkva.

=== Political and military career ===
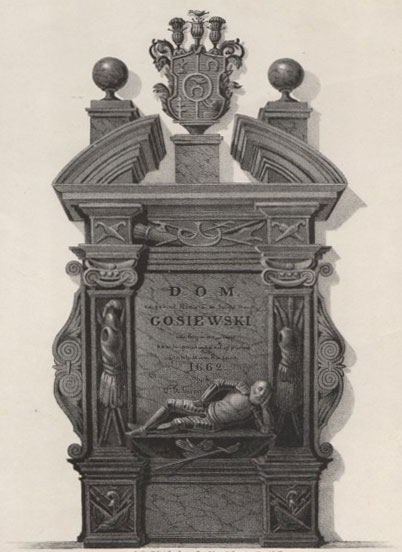
Gosiewski's burial monument

In 1654 he received the Commander's baton/mace from Prince Janusz Radziwiłł, who was appointed the Grand Lithuanian Hetman. During the Swedish invasion, he played an important role politically and militarily. In 1655, he accepted the Union of Kėdainiai of recognition signed between King Charles X Gustav of Sweden and Prince Janusz Radziwiłł, but soon opposed this act and took action aimed at helping the Russian side. Despite being under surveillance, he managed to make contact with the Russian diplomat Vasily Likharov. Trapped by Janusz Radziwiłł he was caught in Kėdainiai, where, as a state prisoner was then transferred to Königsberg. While he was in captivity Karl Gustav was urged to attack Russia and a written confirmation of that intention was given to Tsar Alexis of Muscovy after his release. In the spring of 1656 he escaped from Prussian captivity to Lithuania where in a short time, at their own expense, he organized several Banners.

Battling against Swedish forces, he reached up near Warsaw, where he was one of the royal commissioners who oversaw the takeover of the capital. He participated in the siege of Tykocin and the Battle of Warsaw (1656) after which the Swedish army again occupied the city. Then, on the King's orders, he moved with its banners into the Duchy of Prussia and Lithuania. On 8 October 1656, at the Battle of Prostken, he defeated the Brandenburgian and Swedish armies, capturing Prince Bogusław Radziwiłł. The battle has been described by Henryk Sienkiewicz's novel The Deluge. Another battle fought under his command, on 22 October 1656, was the Battle of Filipów however; it ended with a victory for the forces commanded by Field Marshal Gustaf Otto Stenbock, in the confusion of the battle the Prince Bogusław Radziwiłł managed to escape. In November 1656 at Wierzbowo he signed a truce with Frederick William, Elector of Brandenburg, then as royal commissioner in 1657, he led a ceasefire and concluded the Treaty of Bromberg. In 1658 he fought against the Swedes in the areas of Livonia and Samogitia. In 1658 he participated in the delegation sent by the King to negotiate with Russia. Beaten at the Battle of Verkiai he was captured and imprisoned for nearly four years. He was released from captivity in Moscow in 1662. As compensation, he received the former Radziwiłł's estate in Kėdainiai.

=== Obedience to the King and death ===
He was a supporter of a strong and centralized royal power in limiting the Liberum veto and supported the concept of a successor of the throne with the current King still alive (Vivente rege). At the command of the King wanted to solve the issue of the Fraternal Association, an insurrection created by some long unpaid members of the army claiming the termination of obedience to the King (at the beginning for economic reasons, but later, considering any limitation to Liberum Veto and Vivente Rege proposal as "treason" to Commonwealth constitutional laws). In July 1662, he went to Vilnius for talks with the rebel troops in Lithuania. There he was captured by Konstanty Kotowski, Deputy Speaker of the Fraternal Association, which is thus intended to prevent any agreement that may in effect result in the termination of the insurrection. Wincenty Korwin Gosiewski was shot to death on 29 November 1662 near Ostrynia. Later, the perpetrators of the murder were sentenced to death.

== Marriage and family ==
Wincenty Korwin Gosiewski's children and Magdalena Konopacki were:

- Teresa Korwin Gosiewska, properly Princess Teresa Sapieha (died 1708) – married,

Her first husband, Józef Bogusław Słuszka de armis Ostoja (1652 –1701) was Field-Commander of Lithuania, Castle-Commander of Vilnius, Court Marshal of Lithuania, Great-Standard-Bearer of Lithuania, Great-Hunter of Lithuania, District-Governor of Rzeczyca, Lanckorona, Pinsk, Pieniawa and Jeziera.
Her second husband, Kazimierz Jan Sapieha the Younger, de armis Lis, was Great Cup-Bearer of Lithuania, Deputy Master of the Pantry of Lithuania, Court Treasurer of Lithuania, Field Commander of Lithuania, District-Governor of Zmuzka and Brzeg, Palatine-Governor of Vilnius and Great Commander of Lithuania. She had not offspring of both marriages.

- Zofia Korwin Gosiewska – she married Aleksander Przyjemski, de armis Rawa, High Steward of the Crown.
- Karol – born after the death of the hetman in 1663 and probably died in childhood.

After Wincenty Korwin Gosiewski's death, his widow married Prince Janusz Karol Czartoryski, Chamberlain of Kraków.

Contrary to what numerous studies say bishop of Smolensk Bogusław Korwin Gosiewski (1669–1744) wasn't a son of the Wincenty Korwin Gosiewski and Magdalena Konopacka, but of general of Lithuanian artillery Maciej Korwin Gosiewski and Małgorzata Szwab.
