= Franciszek Krasiński =

Bishop of Krakow (1525–1577)

- Bishop of Kraków
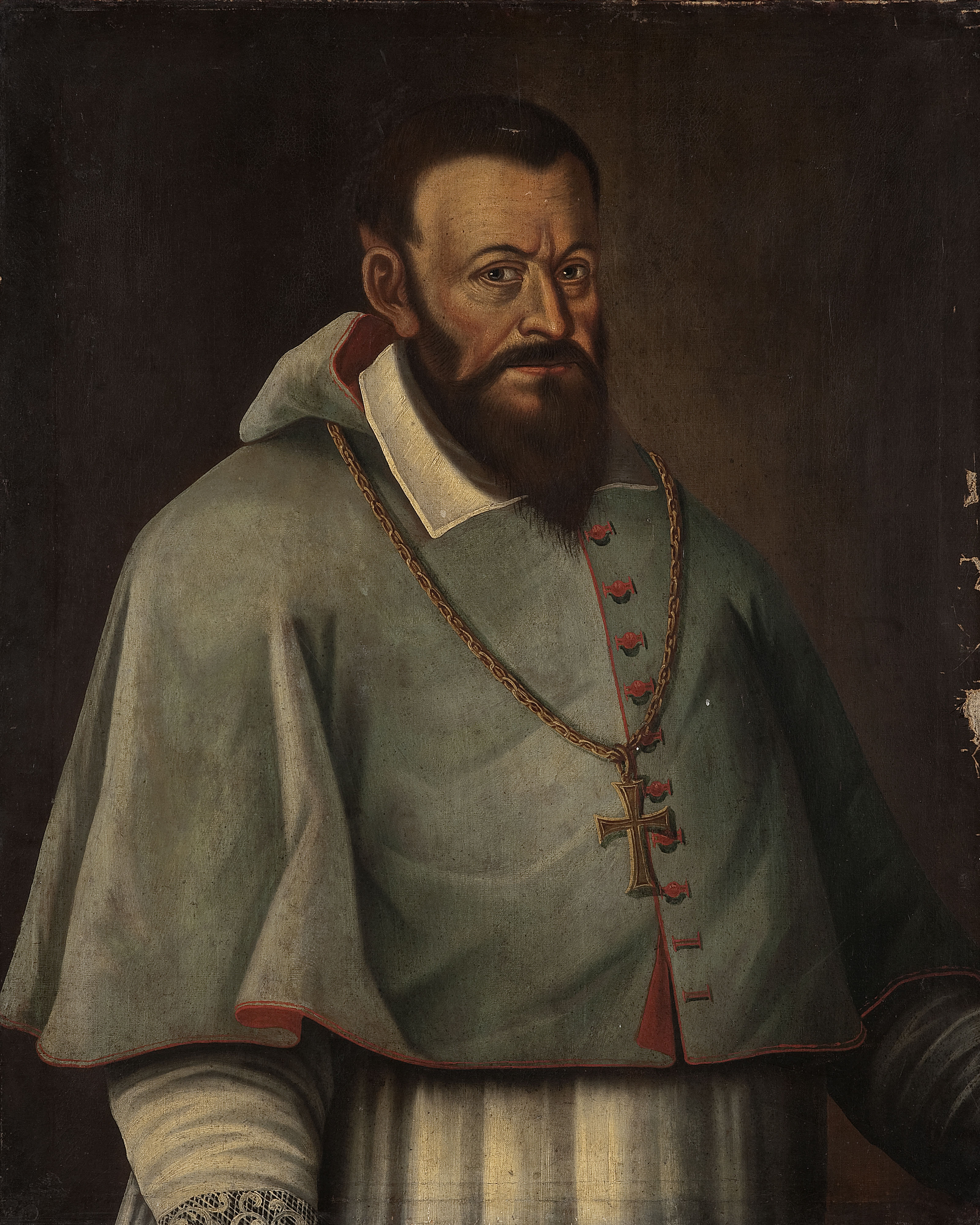
- Previous post(s): Vice-Chancellor of the Crown

Personal details
- Died: 1577
- Coat of arms

Franciszek Krasiński (1525 – 1577) was a Polish nobleman who was Bishop of Kraków (1572-1577).

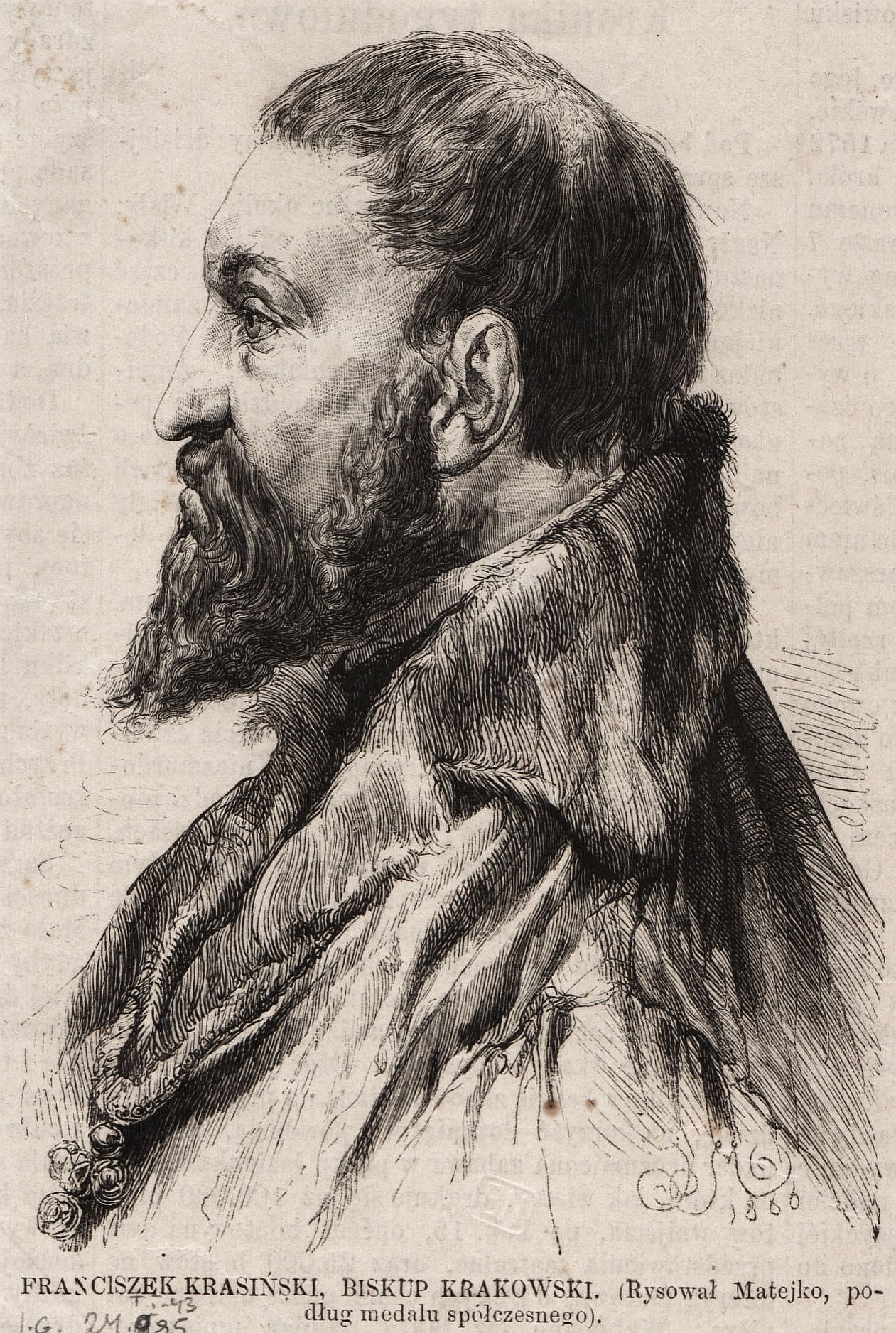
Portrait by Jan Matejko

Krasiński was born in 1525 to Jan Krasiński, a stolnik. The family claimed the Ślepowron coat of arms. As Vice-Chancellor of the Crown, Franciszek Krasiński played a political role during the Union of Lublin. After becoming Bishop of Kraków in 1572, Krasiński was the only bishop to sign the Warsaw Confederation which famously granted religious freedoms in the Polish-Lithuanian Commonwealth. Krasiński offered his signature in order to prevent religious violence, an outcome that the act was generally able to maintain for the duration of the Commonwealth period.

Krasiński died in 1577. A posthumous portrait of him exists in the cloister of the Franciscan friary in Kraków. Jan Matejko also produced a later work depicting Krasiński.
