= Battle of Kroppenhof =

Battle during Polish-Swedish war

- Part of the Polish–Swedish War (1621–1625)
| Date | November 28, 1621 |
| Location | Kroppenhof, Livonia (Krape Parish, Latvia) 56°42′N 25°16′E |
| Result | Polish–Lithuanian victory |

Belligerents
| Polish–Lithuanian Commonwealth | (yes) Swedish Empire |

Commanders and leaders
| Aleksander Gosiewski | (yes) Samuel Cockburn |

Strength
| c. 1,000 men | c. 850 men |

Casualties and losses
| Dozens killed | 300 killed 7 banners |

The Battle of Kroppenhof was fought during the Polish–Swedish War (1621–1625), between the Polish–Lithuanian Commonwealth and the Swedish Empire on November 28, 1621. Polish-Lithuanian forces under the command of Aleksander Gosiewski defeated the Swedish forces commanded by Samuel Cockburn.

== History ==
The clash of Polish, actually Lithuanian, troops operating in central Livonia with the Swedish ones took place on Sunday, November 28, 1621, at Kroppenhof. Perhaps today we would not know anything about it, because it did not belong to the main battles, if not for the records of participants in those events, that is, the account of Aleksander Korwin Gosiewski himself and his hussar companion Jan Kunowski. Cavalry, i.e. Lithuanian hussars and king Gustav Adolf's cuirassiers, took part in the main battle, which announced its fate. Both armies were not huge, the Swedes under the command of Samuel Cockburn numbered about 850 people, while the Polish army led by Aleksander Gosiewski had a total of about 1,000 soldiers.

The forces representing the Polish–Lithuanian Commonwealth included: Gosiewski's Hussar's banner, Lieutenant Borowski's Zumar Hussar's banner, Lieutenant's Wedzagolski's Upland Hussar's banner, Sacken's and Wrangel's reiter's chorus, three Cossack's banners - Pusudziewski, Iwanowski and Golian's infantry, Kietha and Golian's infantry company, Brześć elections) under Krzysztof Oldakowski ”(about 60 soldiers), the latter after the clash consisted of exactly 45 healthy and 5 sick people.

Lithuanian troops marched from the Kokenhauzen fortress when they received news about Swedes stationing several kilometers away and their approximate forces. The Polish commander, Aleksander Gosiewski, decided to surprise the enemy and destroy or disperse from the march, depriving him of his combat strength. Several dozen hussars were selected for the vanguard, commanded by Wladyslaw Krzyczewski, and Krzysztof Oldakowski's chosen infantry, including several dozen soldiers, was appointed as the rear guard and insurance. After traveling exactly 14 kilometers, the Lithuanians reached the Swedish camp, but were noticed by the enemy, who sounded the alarm, giving his time to form battle lines. Despite this, the Polish front guard attacked without hesitation and despite inflicting considerable losses on the enemy, it had to withdraw due to massive fire, Krzyczewski's death and Wrangel's fatal wound. The Swedish cuirassiers under the command of Karol Filip also launched a counter-charge, which broke down when it reached the Polish hussars. Then there were other charges, sometimes by Poles, sometimes by Swedes. The numerical advantage was on the Swedish side, and it was almost twofold, because the Lithuanian main forces had not yet joined the fight, but the combat efficiency of the hussars greatly overwhelmed their opponents. Only when the dragoons of Wilhelm de la Bur saw what was glowing, having abandoned their horses, they set off to escape across the ice-bound Lobes Lake. The others followed their example. The Swedish losses were estimated at almost 300 soldiers, and several dozen Lithuanians also died. All seven banners have been captured.
