= Battle of Filipów =

1656 battle

Coordinates: 54°10′50″N 22°37′15″E

- Part of the Second Northern War / The Deluge
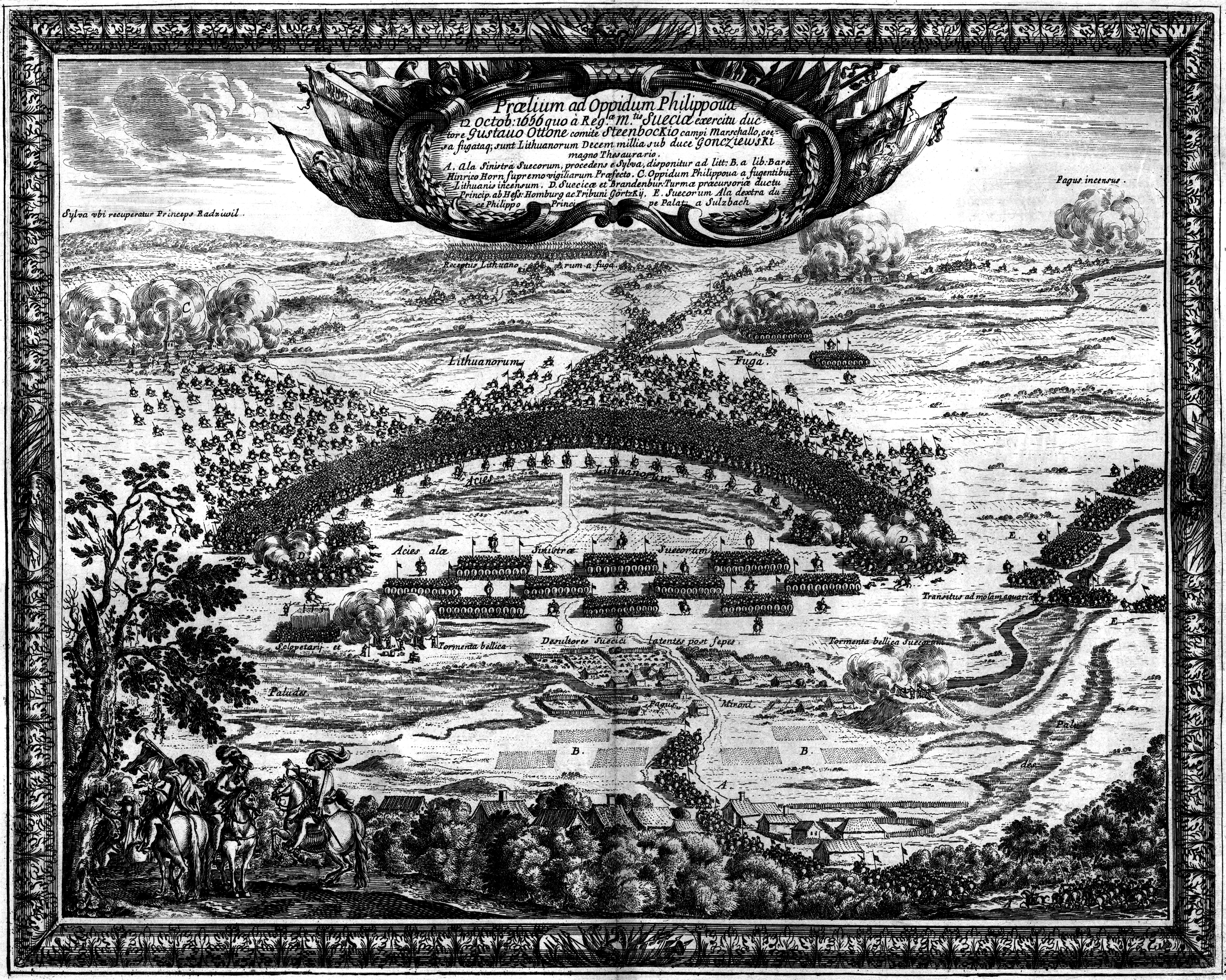
- Battle of Filipów by Erik Dahlberg
Date	October 22, 1656
Location	Filipów
Result	Swedish-Brandenburger victory

Belligerents
(Swedish Empire) Sweden (Margraviate of Brandenburg) Brandenburg-Prussia	Polish–Lithuanian Commonwealth

Commanders and leaders
(Swedish Empire) Gustaf Otto Stenbock (Margraviate of Brandenburg) Georg von Waldeck	(Polish–Lithuanian Commonwealth) Wincenty Korwin Gosiewski

Strength
6,000 men	5,000 men

Casualties and losses
light	500–600 killed 200 captured

The Battle of Filipów was fought on October 22, 1656 between forces of the Polish–Lithuanian Commonwealth commanded by Field Lithuanian Hetman Wincenty Korwin Gosiewski on one side, and on the other allied Swedish and Brandenburg-Prussia forces commanded by Gustaf Otto Stenbock and Prince Georg Friedrich of Waldeck. The battle ended with victory for the Swedish-Brandenburg-Prussian troops.

After their victory in the Battle of Prostki, the Lithuanian - Tatar forces began widespread looting of the Duchy of Prussia. Soon afterwards, Crimean Tatar units, allied to Poland–Lithuania headed back to their homeland, and the Commonwealth army shrank to some 8,500.

In the second half of October, a Swedish - Brandenburg - Prussian army of some 9,000 rushed towards the Lithuanians, who camped in the town of Filipów. The Lithuanians were commanded by Hetman Wincenty Korwin Gosiewski, while Swedish-Prussian forces were led by Gustaf Otto Stenbock and Prince Georg Friedrich of Waldeck.

While main Lithuanian forces rested in Filipów, Swedish-Prussian army carried out a surprise attack on their rear units, which were stationed in Mieruniszki. As time went by, additional units on both sides entered the battle. From the very beginning, Gustaf Otto Stenbock and Georg Friedrich of Waldeck enjoyed a tactical advantage. The Lithuanians were threatened with encirclement, so Gosiewski ordered a retreat northwards. Due to this decision, Lithuanian losses were negligent, with one exception of Prince Bogusław Radziwiłł, who had been captured in Prostki, and who was released in Filipów.

After the battle, the Lithuanians retreated from the Duchy of Prussia, while Stenbock with his army headed southwards, to the Vistula river.
