= Filipów, Podlaskie Voivodeship =

Filipów
- Village
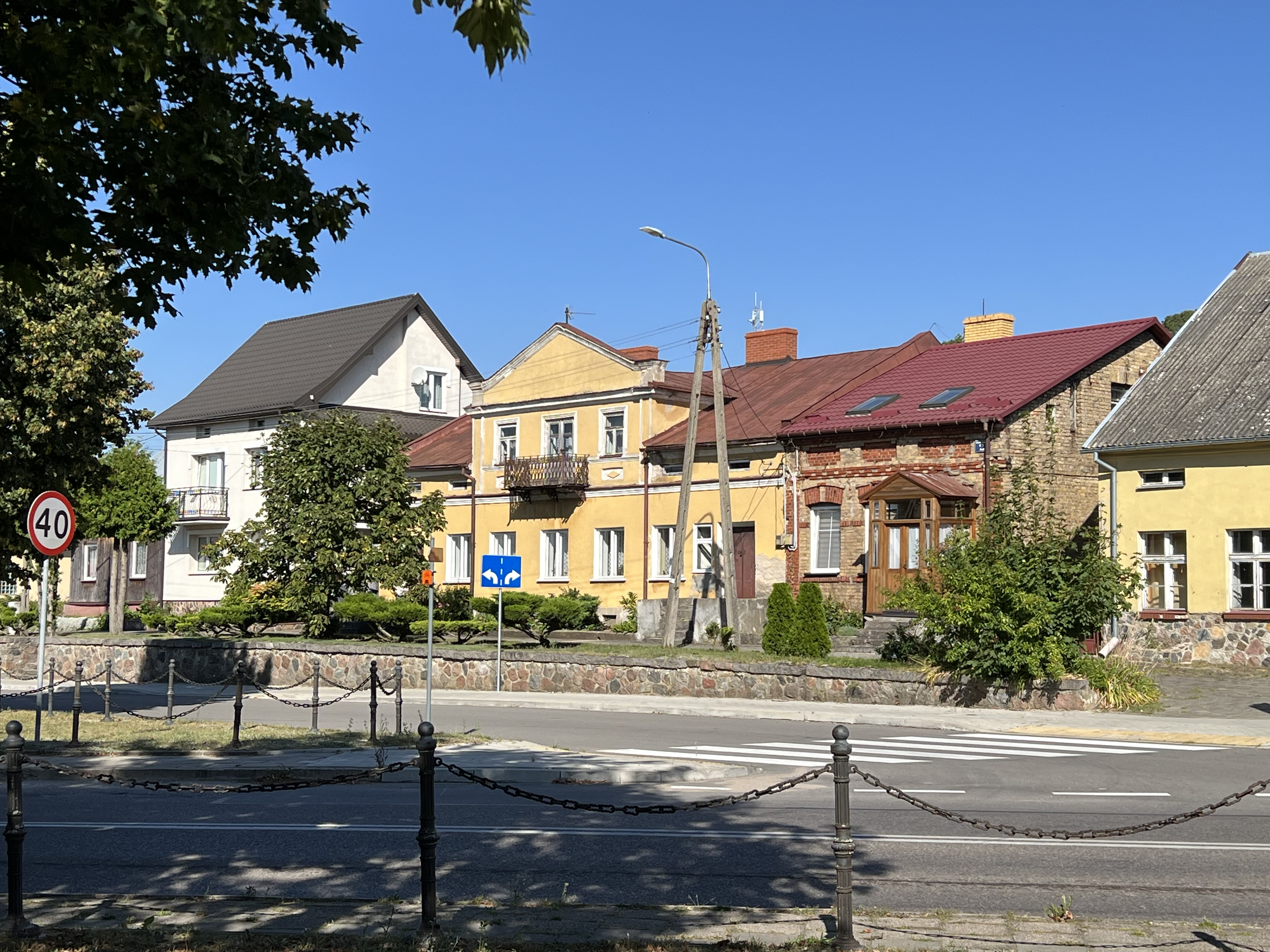
- Stephen Báthory Square in Filipów

- Location within Poland
- Coordinates: 54°10′50″N 22°37′15″E
- Country: Poland
- Voivodeship: Podlaskie Voivodeship
- County: Suwałki
- Gmina: Filipów

Population
  - Total: 1,814
- Time zone: UTC+1 (CET)
  - Summer (DST): UTC+2 (CEST)
- Vehicle registration: BSU

Filipów (Note: Polish pronunciation: [fiˈlipuf]; Lithuanian: Pilypavas) is a village in Suwałki County, Podlaskie Voivodeship, in north-eastern Poland. It is in Gmina Filipów.

== History ==
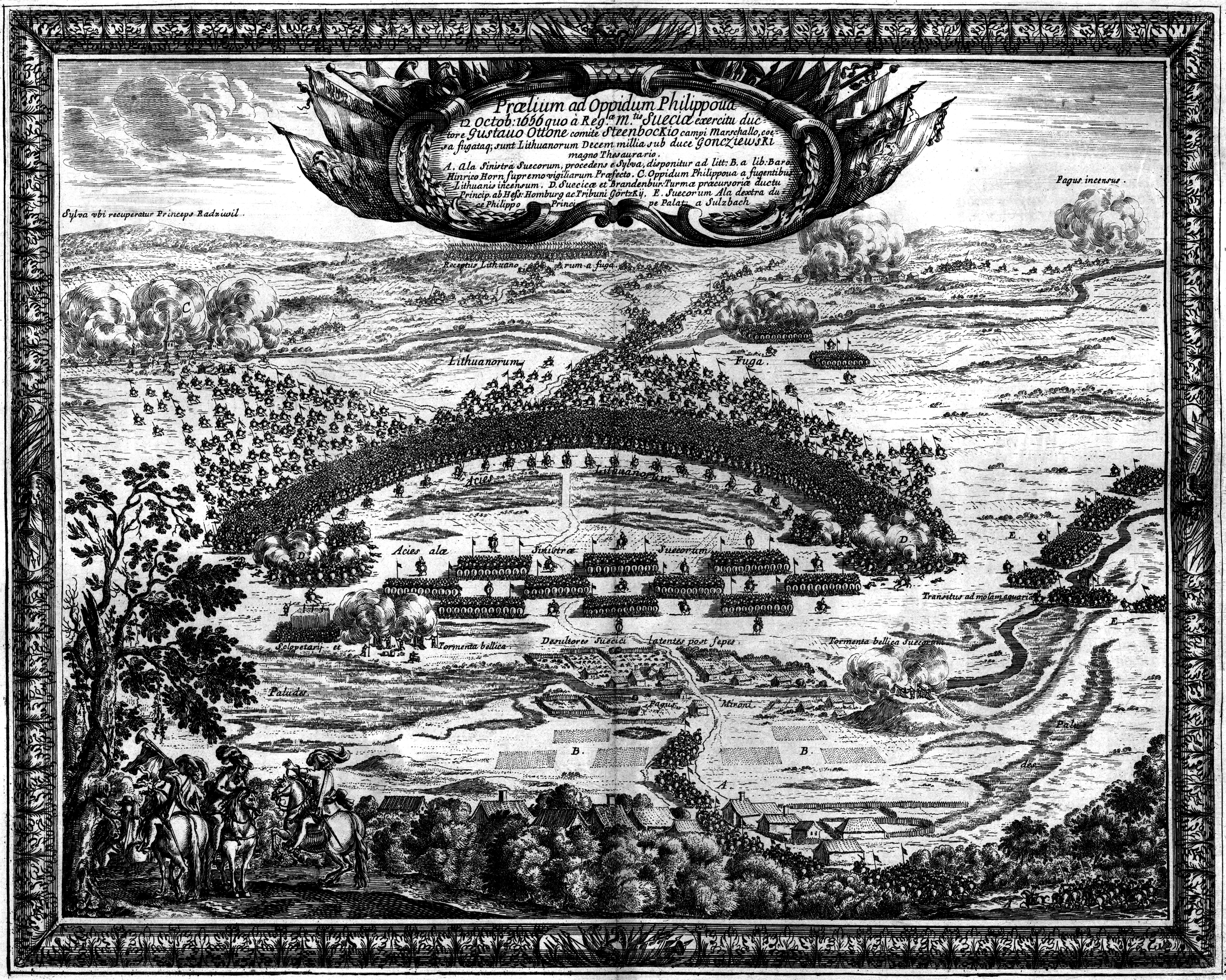
Battle of Filipów

Filipów was granted town rights in 1570 by King Sigismund II Augustus. The following year Sigismund II Augustus established a Catholic parish in Filipów. During the Deluge, in 1656, it was the site of the Battle of Filipów between Poles and Swedes.

It was annexed by Prussia in the Third Partition of Poland in 1795. In 1807, it was regained by Poles and included within the short-lived Duchy of Warsaw, and following its dissolution in 1815, it fell to the Russian Partition of Poland. It lost town status after the January Uprising in 1870.

There was a Jewish Community in Filipów; 75 years after 1939 the community Jewish Torah Scroll was recovered.

== Notable people ==
- Władysław Filipkowski (1892–1950), Polish military officer

== Sources ==
- VLKK (2002). "Atvirkštinis lietuvių kalboje vartojamų tradicinių Lenkijos vietovardžių formų sąrašas" (PDF). VLKK (in Lithuanian). Archived from the original (PDF) on 2012-02-14.
