= Teresa Korwin Gosiewska =

Polish noblewoman (died 1708)

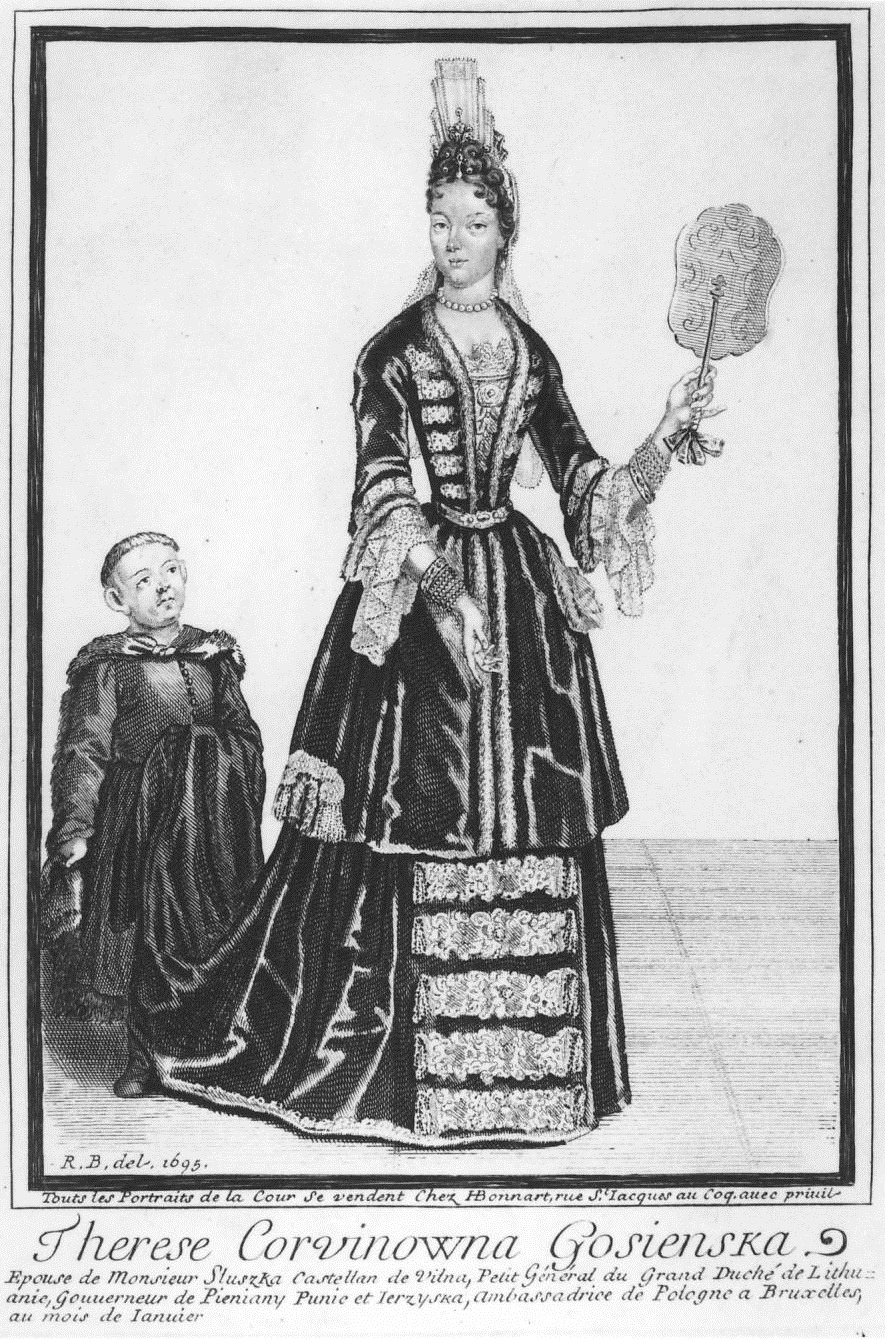
- Teresa Korwin Gosiewska, the Ambassadress of the Polish–Lithuanian Commonwealth in Brussels was portrait in a dress à la mode mixed with Polish jupeczka (fur garment) and a dwarf in Polish costume carrying her train.
- Coat of arms: Ślepowron
- Died: 1708
- Noble family: Gosiewski
- Consorts: Józef Boguslaw Sluszka; Jan Kazimierz Sapieha
- Father: Wincenty Korwin Gosiewski
- Mother: Magdalena Konopacka

Teresa Korwin Gosiewska properly Princess Teresa Sapieha (died 1708) was a Polish noblewoman (szlachcianka) and royal favorite, known for her political activity as the influential confidante of queen Marie Casimire.

== Life ==
She was the daughter of Wincenty Korwin Gosiewski and Magdalena Konopacka.

In 1677, she married Józef Bogusław Słuszka de armis Ostoja (1652–1701), Field-Commander of Lithuania, Castle-Commander of Vilnius, Court Marshal of Lithuania, Great-Standard-Bearer of Lithuania, Great-Hunter of Lithuania, District-Governor of Rzeczyca, Lanckorona, Pinsk, Pieniawa and Jeziera.

By marriage, she attended court regularly, and became a personal friend and confidante of the queen. In 1694, the queen selected her to escort her daughter to her marriage with the Elector of Bavaria. During her absence from Poland, she also visited the French royal court of Louis XIV. From at least 1696, she had a relationship with Jan Kazimierz Sapieha, whom she tried to benefit at court. During the election of 1696-97, she allied with the former queen and tried to raise support in Lithuania for the queen's candidate.

In 1701, she was widowed, and in 1703 she finally married her longtime lover Prince Jan Kazimierz Sapieha, de armis Lis (1637–1720), Great Cup-Bearer of Lithuania. Deputy Master of the Pantry of Lithuania. Court Treasurer of Lithuania. Field-Commander of Lithuania. District-Governor of Zmuzka and Brzeg. Palatine-Governor of Vilnius and Great-Commander of Lithuania.

She opposed the election of Stanisław Leszczyński in 1704. She founded the Jesuit church in Vilnius and a hospital in Antokol.

== Sources ==
- Biogram został opublikowany w 1994 r. w XXXV tomie Polskiego Słownika Biograficznego.
