= Bierzyn =

Bierzyn may refer to the following places in Poland:

- Bierzyn, Lower Silesian Voivodeship (south-west Poland)
- Bierzyn, Kuyavian-Pomeranian Voivodeship (north-central Poland)
