= Tadeusz Gosiewski =

Polish nobleman, lawyer, and diplomat

- Coat of arms: Ślepowron
- Born: 23 July 1900; Olchowiec
- Died: 15 December 1969 (aged 69); Nairobi, Kenya
- Noble family: Gosiewski
- Consort: Elżbieta Rozalia Przezdziecka

Tadeusz Gosiewski (23 July 1900 in Olchowiec – 15 December 1969 in Nairobi) was a Polish nobleman.

He was a lawyer, diplomat and chevalier of the Order of Malta.
