= Aleksander Korwin Gosiewski =

Polish noble and diplomat (died 1639)

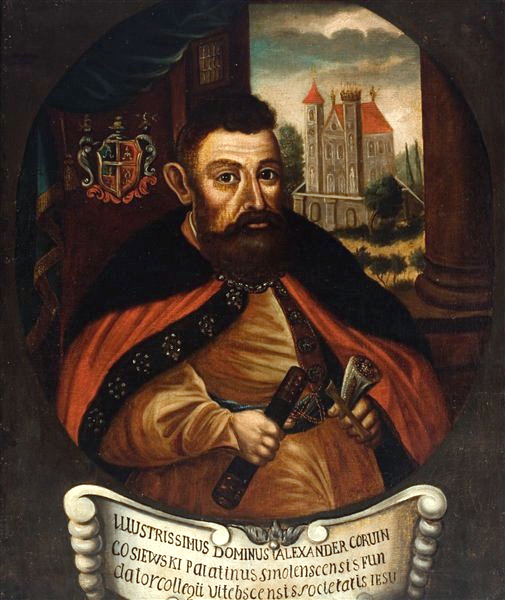
- Coat of arms: Ślepowron
- Born: late 16th century
- Died: 23 May 1639
- Family: Gosiewski
- Wife: Ewa Pac
- Issue: Krzysztof Korwin Gosiewski; Wincenty Korwin Gosiewski; Zuzanna Korwin Gosiewska
- Father: John Korwin Gosiewski

Aleksander Korwin Gosiewski (Lithuanian: Aleksandras Korvinas Gosievskis) de armis Ślepowron (died 1639), was a Polish nobleman, military commander and diplomat, Lithuanian Field-Quartermaster since 1630, Palatine-Governor of Smolensk from 1625, Lithuanian Great-Quartermaster since 1615, Speaker of the Parliament in 1613, Great-Secretary of the Grand Duchy of Lithuania from 1610 and District-Governor of Wieliż, Puńsk, Kupise, Biel, and Markowa.

== Biography ==
=== Youth ===
He came from the noble family Gosiewski of Zambrów powiat in the Łomża Land, a family entitled to use the coat of arms Ślepowron. He was a son of Jan Gosiewski who was married to Ewa (née Pac, the Chamberlain of Brest’s daughter).

Already in his youth, as Lew Sapieha’s courtier, he was involved in affairs of state. In 1600, as member of Lew Sapieha's retinue, he played a significant role in the negotiations with the Tsardom of Russia, editing the planned alliance acts between Poland-Lithuania with the Russian state. In 1602 as District-Governor of Wieliż, he attended the drawing of the border between Poland–Lithuania and Russia and later became famous repelling a Russian attack on his own district. During the wars of Sigismund III Vasa against his uncle Charles IX of Sweden, the King of Sweden, he served in the Lithuanian army. In 1605, he fought at the Battle of Kircholm. In 1606, as a member of the retinue of Mikołaj Oleśnicki, he escorted Maryna Mniszchówna to Moscow, where he led negotiations for an alliance with False Dmitriy I.

=== Military career ===
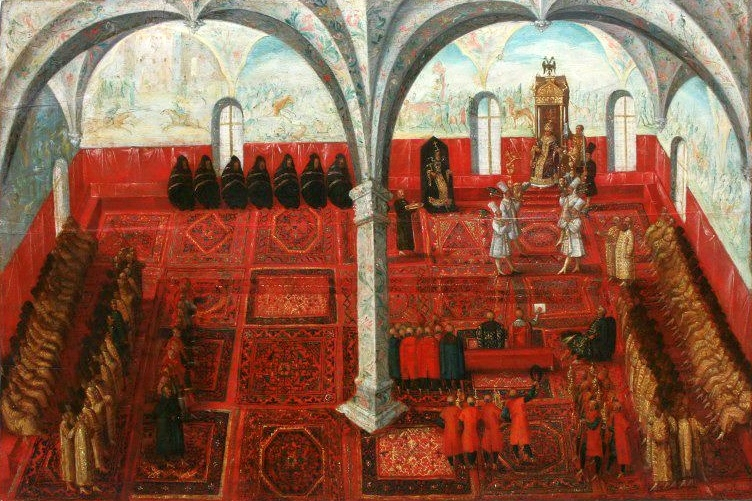
Aleksander Korwin Gosiewski, Grand Envoy of the Polish–Lithuanian Commonwealth holding the letters of credence to Tsar Dimitry Ivanovich the Pretender

He was an ardent supporter of Polish-Lithuanian military intervention in Russia during the Time of Troubles. In July 1609, he conducted his own expedition to Velikiye Luki. He became famous for using fire bombs during the siege of Smolensk. In 1610 he headed a large army to the north of Smolensk, whose objective was to capture Bely fortress. Subsequently, he reached Moscow, which, after the battle of Klushino was taken by Great-Commander Stanisław Żółkiewski. In 1610, he was appointed by Żółkiewski to lead the Polish-Lithuanian garrison in the Moscow Kremlin. In 1611 the Russians betrayed their Polish patrons, and the ensuing insurrection led to the great fire of Moscow. In the year 1612 he handed over command of the Polish-Lithuanian garrison to Mikołaj Struś and returned to Lithuania. Residents of the city under the leadership of a merchant Kuzma Minin and Prince Dmitry Pozharsky began to besiege the Kremlin. The commander of the Polish-Lithuanian garrison in the Kremlin, Strus, realizing that there would be no relief of the siege coming from the Polish king Sigismund III Vasa, surrendered on 4 November 1612. To commemorate the event tsar Mikhail Romanov instituted a holiday named Day of Moscow’s Liberation from Polish Invaders in 1613. In 2004 the public holiday became the Unity Day, which was first celebrated in 2005.

In 1612, he was the commander at Smolensk which he defended against numerous Russian attacks. In 1615, as Lithuanian Field-Quartermaster, he led a small army to block the new Russian army. In 1617 and 1618, Polish-Lithuanian troops participated in a failed expedition to Moscow led by Prince Wladyslaw. In 1618, he commanded the garrison during the siege of Smolensk. After the arrival of the king's troops he camped together with the Commander Jan Karol Chodkiewicz’ troops besieging the city.

=== Politics ===
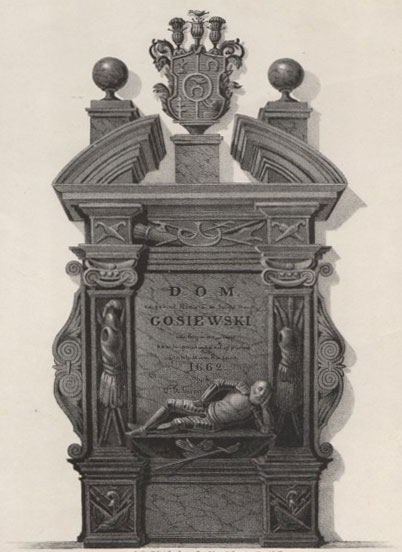
Tomb of Aleksander's son Wincenty Korwin Gosiewski

He was the Marshal of the Sejm which was held in Warsaw from 3 December to 24 December 1613. During the war with Sweden (1621–1625 war) and the (war 1626–1629) he fought in Livonia winning against the Swedish army at Kroppenhof, Lixna, Kreutzburg and Dyneburg. Due to his successes in fighting the Swedes that he was appointed Palatine-Governor of Smolensk region. Seeing the threat from Russia, Gosiewski immediately upon taking the governorate of Smolensk began to renovate the walls of the city. He personally oversaw the construction of Sigismund Fortress, which strengthened the eastern part of the stronghold. He intensively collected supplies of food and ammunition, and developed an intelligence network to gather valuable information about Moscow's war preparations. In the spring of 1632, he reviewed the fortifications in Dorogobuzh and other frontier forts.

During the war with Russia, in the year 1632 and 1634, after a particularly famous defense of Smolensk – for ten months he defended the city against besieging forces led by Mikhail Shein, repelling all assaults, until the advent of the battle led by Prince Władysław, he fought at Vitebsk, Alder and Mstislav. He participated as a Commissioner in peace negotiations which concluded on 14 June 1634, in Treaty of Polanów.

For his services, he received numerous lands in the province of Smolensk. He founded the Jesuits’ College in Vitebsk and the female Monastery of the Holy Brigit at Brest-Litovsk. As Palatine-Governor, he commemorated the death of his longtime client – Jan Kunowski, who in 1640 wrote a series of poems dedicated to his late patron.

=== Death ===
He died on May 23, 1639.

== Family ==
Aleksander Korwin Gosiewski came from the Ślepowron branch of the family.

He was married to Ewa Pac. They had one daughter, Zuzanna, and two sons; Wincenty and Krzysztof.

== References and sources ==
- Jan P. Gosiewski, Fundacje sakralne wojewody smoleńskiego Aleksandra Korwin Gosiewskiego, "Nasza Przeszłość" 139, 2023, p. 129-163.
