= Kosakowski =

Kosakowski is a Polish surname. Notable people with the surname include:

- Daniel Kosakowski (born 1992), American tennis player
- Jakub Kosakowski (born 2002), Polish chess master
