= Jerzy Gosiewski =

Polish politician (born 1952)

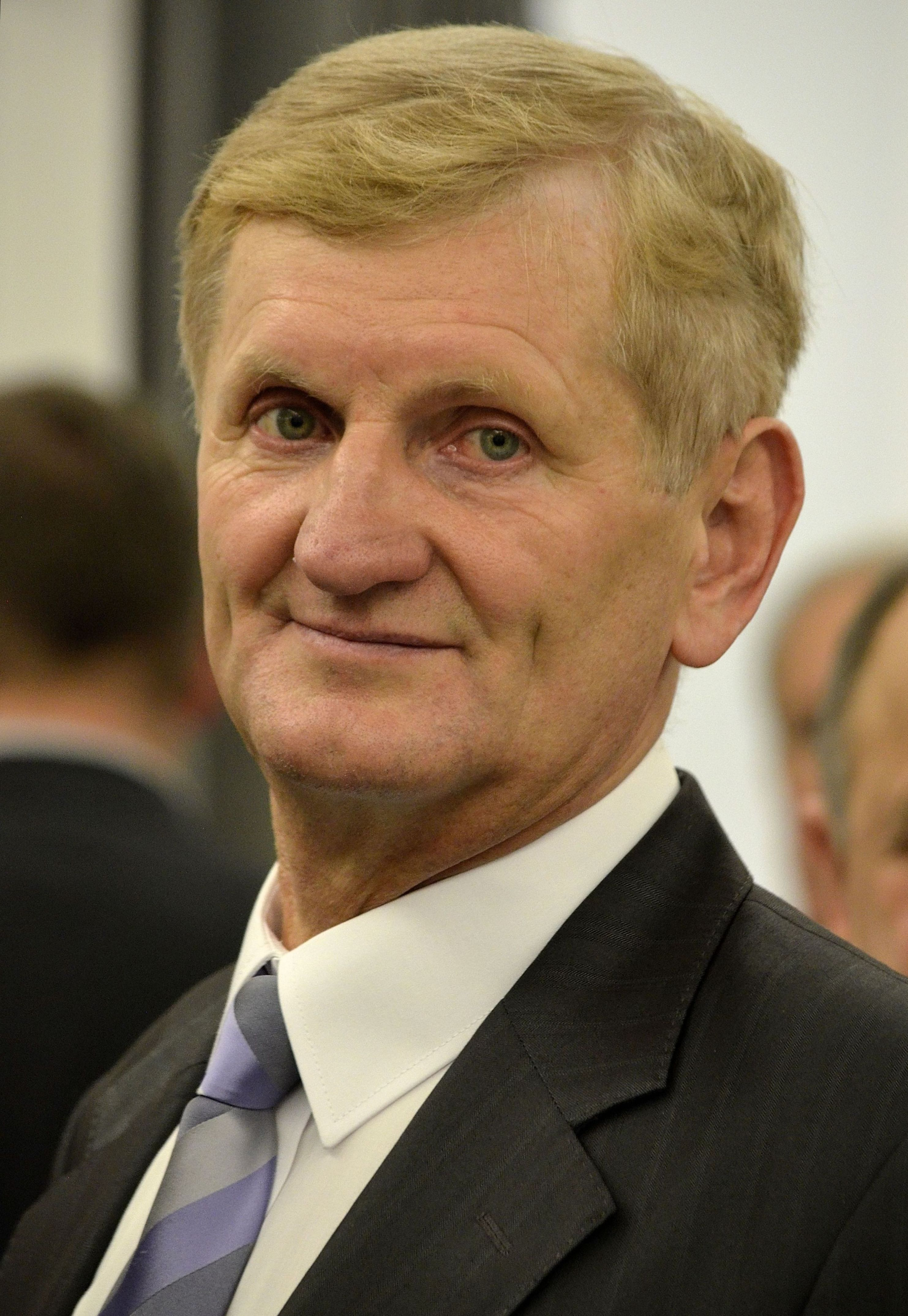
- Gosiewski in 2015

Member of the Sejm
- In office 25 September 2005 – 7 November 2011
- Constituency: 35 – Olsztyn

Personal details
- Born: 20 November 1952 (age 73) Maków Mazowiecki
- Party: Law and Justice

Jerzy Antoni Gosiewski (born 20 November 1952 in Maków Mazowiecki) is a Polish politician. He was elected to the Sejm on 25 September 2005, getting 3782 votes in 35 Olsztyn district as a candidate from the Law and Justice party.

== See also ==
- Members of Polish Sejm 2005-2007
