= Teodorowicz =

Teodorowicz is a Polish language patronymic surname derived from the first name Theodore. Historical feminine form is Teodorowiczowa. Russified form: Teodorovich.

People with this surname include:

- Ivan Teodorovich (Iwan Teodorowicz, 1875–1937), Russian Bolshevik of Polish descent
- Józef Teodorowicz (Հովսէպ Թեոֆիլ Թեոդորովիչ, 1864–1938), the last Armenian Catholic Archbishop of Lviv
- Katarzyna Teodorowicz-Lisowska (born 1972), Polish Olympic tennis player
- Tadeusz Teodorowicz (1931–1965), Polish international speedway rider
