= Coat of arms of Głogów =

Coat of arms of Glogów

The coat of arms of Głogów depicts a shield divided crosswise into four fields, with a fifth central field on which there appears in the centre an initial golden "G" on a red background.

The first field is blue and shows a crowned Madonna, holding a sceptre and the baby Jesus, standing on a silver crescent moon. This entire image is enveloped by a golden aureola.

The second field shows a black Silesian eagle, on a gold background, wings outstretched. Across its chest we see a silver crescent moon, and a cross on it.

The third field is red, on it a black head of a bull facing forward.

The fourth field is blue, on it a raven sits on a golden branch with three knots. The crow is facing inward.

Historical description of the symbols on this coat of arms:

1st quadrant: The Madonna is the patroness of the oldest church of Glogow, which goes back even to the time of the Piasts. The image of the Madonna appears on city stamps from Glogow even as early as 1326.

2nd: The black crownless eagle is the coat of arms of the Silesian Piasts. The eagle was a universal symbol and very popular, since its meaning encapsulated strength, courage, wisdom and fairness.

3rd: The black head of bull. This motif was often seen on coins struck in the Glogow mint. The head of the bull was from the coat of arms of the royal elders of the noble Glogow family of Hans von Loos, who was also the overseer of the city mint.

4th: The black raven. The image of the crow appear on the city's seal on 17 March 1490. A crow sitting on a silver branch is the coat of arms of the Korwins, who ruled the Duchy of Glogów. In the 15th century, they donated their crest to the city.

== See also ==
- Flag of Głogów
