= Ślepowron coat of arms =

Polish coat of arms

Ślepowron
- Battle cry: Bojno, Bujno
- Alternative names: Bojno, Bujno, Pesze, Pęszno, Szeptyc, Korwin, Corvin, Ślepy Wron
- Earliest mention: 1224, 1238 as Ślepowron
- Cities: Ruda-Huta, Ślepowrony
- Families: 992 names

Ślepowron is a Polish coat of arms. It was used by several szlachta families in the times of the Polish–Lithuanian Commonwealth. From the fifteenth century, the descendants of the Ślepowron family began to use names taken from their lands. This led to many different surnames being created within one family, symbolically united under the Korwin (raven) coat of arms, which is thus unique in Polish heraldry. Wawrzęta Korwin de Ślepowron is the oldest known ancestor of the family, although their oral traditions claim descent from Marcus Valerius Corvus, a Roman general.

== History ==
Ślepowron variations

The name Ślepowron is said to be taken from the village of Ślepowrony near Płońsk, Mazowsze, which belonged to the then-established Korwin-Piotrowski family. According to "Herbów Rycerstwa Polskiego" by Bartosz Paprocki) this village was given to the knight Wawrzęta de Ślepowrony by Fr. Konrad Mazowiecki.

=== Motto ===
“Kości spròchniałe powstańcie z mogiły, Przywdziejcie ducha i ciało i siły' - Woronicz (found in Herbarz Polski, Hipolit Stupnicki)

=== Sarmatian Totem ===
The raven is of much older, legendary pagan origins. A Polish aristocratic clan of Sarmatian origin chose the raven, possibly as its "rodnidze" or clan totem.

=== The 1224 Grant ===
Many centuries later, a raven is attested in a grant of privilege to Warzęta Korwin z Ślepowrony, from Duke Konrad I of Masovia, given at Warsaw in 1224.

=== The Roman-Hungarian legend ===
The full Korwin shield, with the ring in the raven's beak, came to Poland from Hungary almost two centuries later, via the Roman-Hungarian legend amid contacts between the Polish nobility and the Hungarian Royal Court.

==== Roman legend ====
The Roman tribune Marcus Valerius Corvus, born 370 BC of the gens Valerii, in 349BC accepted a challenge to single combat by a barbarian warrior. During the combat, a raven perched upon Valerius' helmet and pecked his foe's eyes so fiercely that the barbarian was blinded. In memory of his victory, Valerius got the agnomen Corvinus from Corvus (raven). Marcus Valerius Messalla Corvinus (64BC-8AD) was Caesar Augustus' co-consul.

==== Hungarian/Polish legend ====
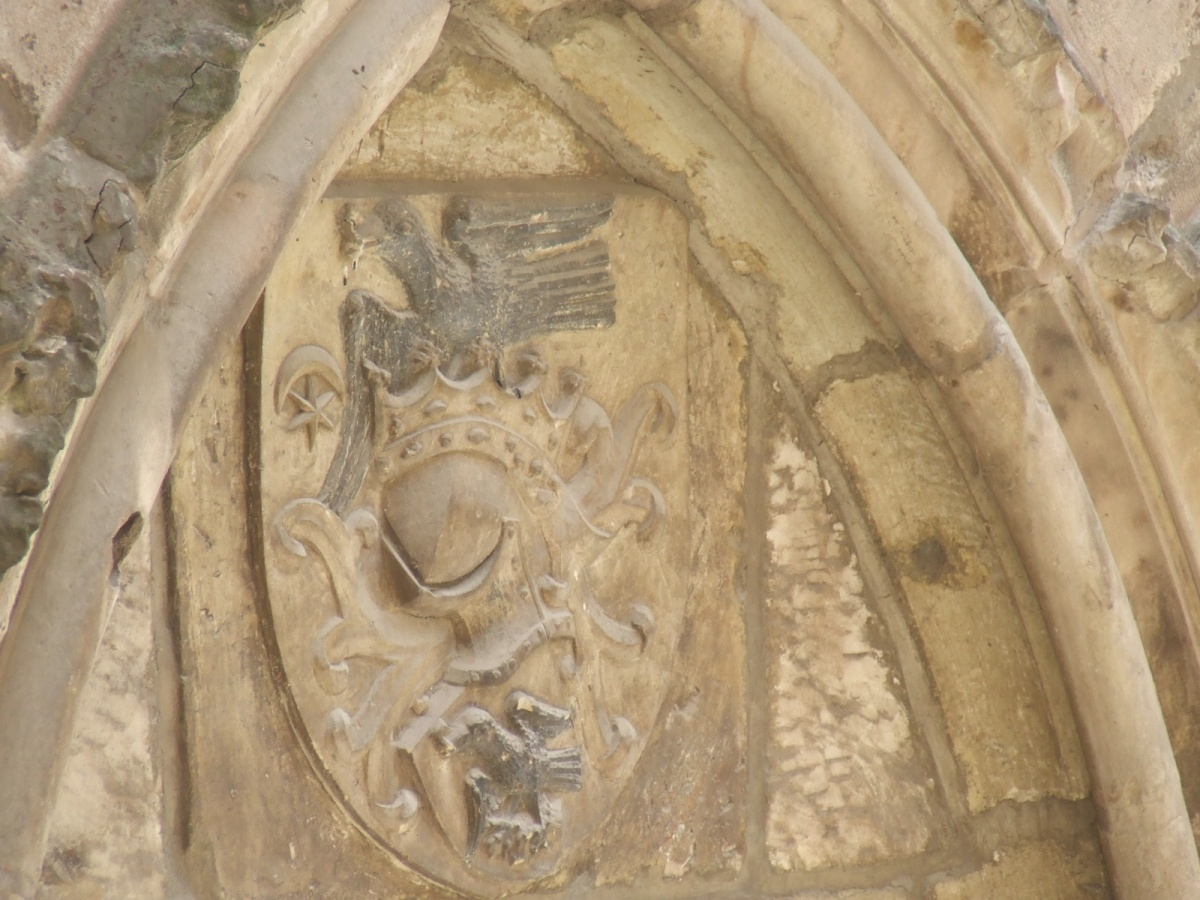
Coat of arms on the Corvin´s castle in Hunedoara county (Hungarian: Hunyad), Romania

In the Kingdom of Hungary, the Wallachian-Hungarian family of Korvin had flourished since the 15th century. Janos Hunyadi and his son Matthias Corvinus Hunyadi, King of Hungary and Bohemia, called themselves "Corvinus" and minted coins displaying a raven with a ring.

The epithet Corvinus was coined by Matthias' biographer, the Italian Antonio Bonfini, who claimed that the Hunyadi family descended from Marcus Valerius Corvinus, who had supposedly settled on the Dacian-Pannonian frontiers, the future Hungary. This claim was later taken over by the Polish aristocrats connected with the Hungarian Hunyadi family.

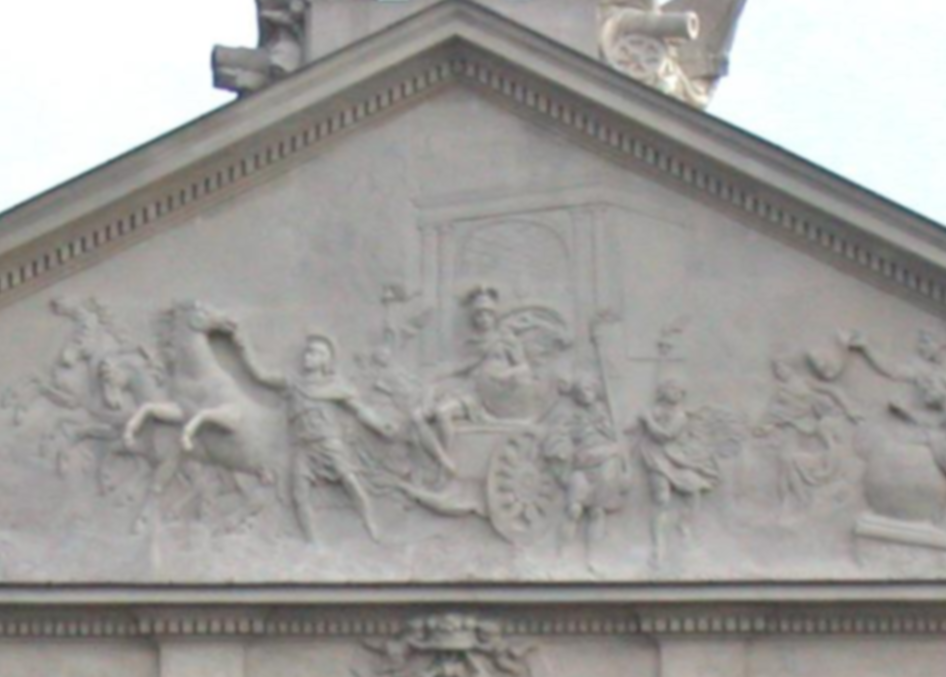
The triumph of Marcus Valerius Corvinus in the pediment of the Krasiński Palace in Warsaw

==== House Medonich ====
The house of Medonich, of Magyar origin, anciently held territories in the Moldavian region of eastern Hungary, in the forests of Transylvania and Moldavia. The family was recorded to attend the national council of 1221 in which King Andras II issued the Golden Bull according self-determination to the nobles and gentry

Konrada Mazowieckiego established the Slepowron, Stracchowa, Drozkzion and Wola clans in 1224. His descendants through his son Korwin or Corwins were nobles in north Italy. Another branch settled in Drozkzino Latvia and Slavonia. One member of the Medonich family appeared at the Prussian court in 1414 acting as a representative for his family in Galacia; another appeared at Dobryczn in 1674.

==== King Matthias's Ring ====
In addition to the above, the Silesian Annals tell that a raven carried off the ring which King Matthias, (who was also ruler of the Duchy of Głogów, and Suzerain of all the Silesian duchies), had removed from his finger. Matthias chased the bird down and slew it, retrieving the ring - and in commemoration of this event, he took the Raven as a symbol for his signet sign.

== Blazon ==
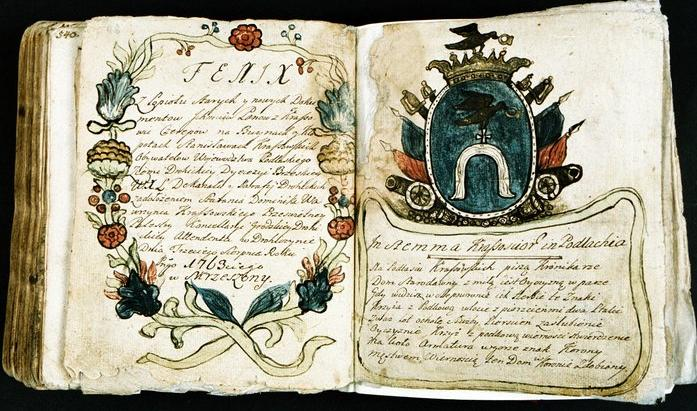
Diary of the Krassowski h. Ślepowron family from Drohicka Land in Podlaskie, 1763

A black raven with a gold ring in its beak and its wings somewhat extended for flight, facing right, standing atop a cross, on the shoulders of a horseshoe standing erect with heels at the bottom.

The shield is blue and the horseshoe silver. Above the shield, on a crowned helmet stands a similar raven.

The horseshoe and cross were added to the coat of arms due to a marriage alliance with the Pobog clan. A later version adopted by many Korwin families is the Korwin coat of arms, in which the raven stands on a log rather than a horseshoe.

== Families ==
=== A ===
Adziewicz, Andziewicz, Audziewicz, Auxtul, Awdziewicz

=== B ===
Bagieński, Bagiński, Bagnicki, Bańkowski, Baraniecki, Barański, Barszczewski, Bejnarowicz, Berdowski, Berliński, Bernikowicz, Bibełowicz, Biernikowicz, Bigoszewski, Bogiński, Bogucki, Bogulski, Bogumirski, Bogusławski, Bohniski, Bojnarowicz, Bojnicki, Bolejsza, Boleski, Bolesza, Bonasewicz, Bonasiewicz, Bonaszewicz, Borewicz, Borzymowski, Boski, Bossowski, Brański, Bratkowski, Broleński, Bronicki, Broszkowski, Brotkowski, Browiński, Brudkowski, Bruszewski, Brużewicz, Brzeski, Brzostowski, Brzozowski, Brzuchowicki, Brzuchowiecki, Buceń, Buchowiecki, Buczeń, Buczyński, Bujalski, Bujanowski, Bujko, Bujkowski, Bujnicki, Bujniewicz, Bujno, Bujwen, Bujwid Gran Duke Princ, Bukon, Bułajski, Burnicki, Burnys, Butrymowicz, Buywid Grand Duke Princ, Bystry, Bystrym, Byszakowski

=== C ===
Chamera, Caziński, Cedziński, Cetnerowski, Chaliński, Charbowski, Chądzyński, Chełmoński, Chodorowski, Chodzewski, Chojnowski, Choynowski, Chryzoln, Chrzanowski, Chrzczonowicz, Chrzczonowski, Chudol, Chudoli, Chudzewski, Ciarnowski, Ciecianiec, Ciecierski, Cieciorski, Ciezierski, Ciprski, Cyprski, Czaczkowski, Czajkowski, Czapkowski, Czarnocki, Czarnomski, Czarnowski, Czartoszewki, Czaykowski, Czeczerski, Czekotowski, Czepkowski, Czerwiakowski, Czykalski.

=== D ===
Dachnowski, Daczewski, Danowski, Darowski, Dąbrowski, Demby, Deszczyński, Dęby, Dobrowlański, Dobrowolski, Dobrski, Dokuchits, Dowdorowicz, Dowgint, Dowkont, Drachowski, Drągowski, Drąsutowicz, Drążewski, Drodzieński, Drongutowicz, Dronsutowicz, Drozdziński, Drożeński, Drożewski, Drużbicz, Drużyński, Drygalski, Dryżyński, Dubiski, Duchna, Duchnowski, Dudarewicz, Dudorowicz, Dugosz-Wykrzykowski, Dworschak / Dworak, Dworakowski, Dyakowicz, Dybowski, Dziadkowski, Dziczkaniec, Dziekuński, Dziewiecki, Dzięcielski, Dzięczyński, Dziwulski

=== F ===
Fabowicki, Falęcki, Faśkiewicz, Fedorowicz, Fiałkowski, Fijałkowski, Filichowski, Filipowski, Filochowski, Flerianowicz, Florjanowicz, Foczyński, Frankowski, Frąckiewicz, Fulkowski, Fułkowski

=== G ===
Gadomski, Gajewski, Galczewski, Gallilewicz, Gałczewski, Garbaszewski, Garczyński, Gawkowski, Gawlikowski, Gawroński, Gąsiewski, Gąsiorowski, Gąsowicz, Gąssowski, Gerlach, Gęsicki, Gęsiewski, Giegnatki, Giegniątko, Gierdziejewski, Gierlach, Giędzwił, Girdwojń, Girdwoyń, Giryłowicz, Glinka, Glińka, Gliński, Głuchowski, Głuszczyński, Głuszyński, Głyszyński, Gniazdowsk, Goczanowski, Golimont, Golimunt, Golinowicz, Golmont, Gontowski, Gorka, Gorodelski, Gorski, Gosiewski, Goś, Gozdziewski, Goździewski, Górnicz, Górski, Groblewski, Grochowarski, Grodecki, Gronkowski, Gronostajski, Grotowski, Gruszecki, Gryziewicz, Gumkowski, Gumowski, Gutkowski, Gutowski, Gutt, Gwinczewski

=== H ===
Hałuszczyński, Harbaszewski, Harbowski, Hładunowicz, Hoffman, Horbaszowski, Horn, Horodyński, Horodziński, Hościło, Hrunicki

=== I ===
Idzikowski, Idziński, Idźkowski

=== J ===
Jaczyński, Jagniątko, Jagodyński, Jagodziński, Jagoszewski, Jaguszewski, Jaka, Jakka, Janiszewski, Jankiewicz, Janowski, Jarczowski, Jarmusz, Jarmuszewski, Jaruszelski, Jaruzelski, Jarużelski, Jasiewicz, Jasiewski, Jastrzębski, Jasuda, Jasudajtis, Jasudowicz, Jaszewski, Jeruzalski, Jezierski, Josiewski, Jórski, Junkiewicz, Jurewicz, Jurgielewicz, Jurgielewski, Jurjewicz, Jurkiewicz, Jurski, Jursza, Jurzyn, Juszkiewicz, Juskowski, Juszkowicz, Juściński

=== K ===
Kabaszewicz, Kabok, Kabot, Kalenczyński, Kaleński, Kalinowski, Kaliński, Kaluchniewicz, Kałęczyński, Kamieński, Kamiński, Kamocki, Karnecki, Karp, Karulewski, Karwowski, Kasperowicz, Kącki, Kątski, Kępkowski, Kidycki, Kierbedź, Kierbiedź, Kijuć, Kimejć, Klimaszewski, Klimkowski, Klimowicz, Klis, Klusza, Kłopotowski, Kłoskowski, Kobylański, Kobyleński, Kobyliński, Kochański, Kochnowski, Kochowicz, Kokoszczyński, Kokoszyński, Kolnarski, Kołmasz, Komarczewski, Komarczowski, Komarzewski, Komecki, Komocki, Komorowski, Komuński, Kończyński, Kończyski, Kopcewicz, Kopciewicz, Kopczyński, Korbedź, Kordecki, Korodziowski, Korwin, Korwin-Milewski, Korwin-Piotrowski, Kosacki, Kosakiewicz, Kosakowski, Kossacki, Kossak, Kossakiewicz, Kossakowski, Kostecki, Kostka, Kostro, Kostrowski, Kościanka, Kowalski, Kownacki, Koziarski, Kozłowski, Kozubski, Krakowski, Krakówka, Krapowski, Krasiński, Kraskowski, Krasowski, Krassowski, Krażyński, Krokowski, Kropiwnicki, Kroszczyński, Krukowski, Krupiański, Krupnicki, Kryński, Krzemieniecki, Krzemieniewski, Krzeski, Krzewski, Krzymowski, Krzyżewicz, Księżopolski, Kuczecki, Kuczkiewicz, Kuczkowicz, Kuczkowski, Kuczyński, Kudelski, Kudyński, Kukowski, Kuksinowicz, Kukszyn, Kulesza, Kuleszka, Kuleszyński, Kuliczkowski, Kulka, Kulmanowski, Kumkowski, Kurakowski, Kurkowski, Kurmin, Kurowski, Kurp, Kurpiewski, Kuszelewski, Kuźma, Kwira, Kwiro

=== L ===
Lachowski, Lamiecki, Laniecki, Laudański-Steczwiłło, Lawdbor, Ledowicz, Lenarski, Lenart, Lenartowicz, Leniewicz, Leontowicz, Lewandowski, Lewgowd, Leźnicki, Leżnicki, Ligiejko, Ligocki, Likowski, Liniewicz, Lipczyński, Lipiak, Lipink, Lipnicki, Lisogórski, Lisowski, Lissowski, Litoszewski, Lubowicki, Lutko, Lutomierski, Lutomirski, Lutosławski

=== Ł ===
Ładnowski, Łajszczewski, Łajszewski, Łaniecki, Łankowski, Łapiński, Łaszczewski, Łaściszewski, Ławrynowicz, Łącki, Łędzki, Łopatecki, Łopatyński, Łopuski, Łopuszański, Łowicki, Łowiecki Łowkiański, Łowmiański, Łoza, Łuczyński, Łuczyski, Łuk, Łukanowski, Łuniewski, Łupianka, Łupieński, Łupiński, Łykoski, Łykowski

=== M ===
Macerna, Maciański, Mackiewicz, Maleciński, Maleszewski, Malewski, Malinowski, Maliński, Małujewicz, Marecki, Markiewicz, Markowski, Marmakiewicz, Maszczybrodzki, Matański, Matecki, Maternicki, Matusiewicz, Matuszewicz, Medeniecki, Meduniecki, Meduniewski, Medyniecki, Meleniewski, Melkowski, Miakowski, Mianowski, Miełkowski, Mierkowski, Mieroszewski, Mieroszowski, Mikłaszowski, Mikucki, Mikuta, Milejko, Milejkowicz, Milejkowski, Milewski, Mileyko, Milkiewicz, Milkowski, Miłejko, Miłkowski, Miłobęcki, Miłobędzki, Miłodroski, Miłodrowski, Mimojń-Staszyński, Minichowski, Minkiewicz, Minowski, Mirkowski, Mironowski, Miroszewski, Miroszowski, Misiński, Miskiewicz, Mitkiewicz, Mitkowicz, Młodocki, Młodziejewski, Młodziejowski, Młożewski, Młożowski, Mnichowicz, Mnichowski, Mochelski, Moczulski, Moczydłowski, Mokowski, Mołożewski, Moncewicz, Moraszczeński, Morohowski, Morokowski, Morozowski, Morszkowski, Morzewski, Morzkowski, Morzydło, Mosicki, Mosiecki, Mościcki, Mościeczny, Mrokowski, Mrowczewski, Mrzeski, Mrzewski

=== N ===
Naborowski, Naddolski, Nadolski, Nadulski, Nahumowicz, Nartowski, Nasierowski, Nasiłowski, Nasiorowski, Nasurowski, Nasutowski, Naszarkowski, Niecikowski, Niekrasz, Niekraś, Niemierka, Niesiorowski, Niestoimski, Niestojemski, Niszcz, Norwiłło, Norwiło, Nosek, Nowakowski, Nowicki, Nowodzielski, Nowosielecki, Nowosielski, Nowosilski

=== O ===
Ocicki, Oczko, Oglęcki, Oględzki, Oksztul, Olizarowicz, Olszański, Olszewski, Oskrzeszewski, Opala, Opoka, Ostrowski, Oxtul

=== P ===
Pabrez, Pabreża, Pacewicz, Padlewski, Pański, Papa, Papieński, Papiński, Paszkowski, Paszyński, Pawliński, Pawłowski, Paździerski, Pensa, Penski, Peński, Perka, Perkowski, Petrozelin, Petrozolin, Pęsa, Pęski, Pęza, Piątkowski, Pienicki, Pieniecki, Pietnicki, Piętka, Pigienicki, Piniński, Piotrowski, Pióro, Pisarzewski, Piski, Piskowski, Piszkowski, Pleskaczewski, Plewiński, Pluciński, Płuszczewski, Pniewski, Podczaski, Podernia, Pokłoński, Połaski, Pomianowski, Popławski, Porowski, Porzecki, Potyralski, Powiatowski, Prątnicki, Prosiński, Proszyński, Przełomiński, Przełomski, Przesmycki, Przestrzelski, Przestrzeński, Przewłocki, Przezdziecki, Przyborowski, Przyłucki, Przyłuski, Przysiorowski, Puchalski, Pudernia, Pugalski, Puklicz, Pulikowski, Pułacki, Pułaski, Puławski, Puzielewicz, Pyszkowski

=== R ===
Racewicz, Raciborski, Racyborski, Raczyński, Radwiłłowicz, Radłowski, Radwiłowicz, Rajczyński, Rajkiewicz, Rajzner, Rakowski, Ramański, Ramocki, Ratyński, Raykiewicz, Rączka, Rejmer, Relidzyński, Rembowski, Remidowski, Reżanowicz, Rębowski, Rodliński, Rogalski, Rogowski, Roliński, Roman, Romański, Romaskiewicz, Romaszka, Romaszkiewicz, Romaszko, Romaszkowicz, Romejko, Romeyko, Romocki, Ropalski, Rosalski, Rosiński, Rossalski, Rostocki, Roszeyko, Rozanowicz, Rozbicki, Rozewski, Rożanowicz, Rożnowski, Rudziewski, Rumocki, Rutkowski, Ruzanowicz, Rybałtowski, Rybczyński, Rybicki, Rycharski, Rychliński, Ryczywolski, Rymejko, Rymejkowicz, Rymiński, Rymkiewicz, Rząca, Rzączyński, Rzekiecki, Rzońca

=== S ===
Samecki, Sarnacki, Sarnecki, Sarnicki, Sarnowski, Satkiewicz, Sawicki, Sczucki, Sergijewski, Sęczykowski, Siderkiewicz, Siedmiogrodzki, Siehiejewicz, Sieklucki, Sierhejewicz, Sierhijewicz, Sierzchowski, Sikorski, Simonowicz, Sipniewicz, Sipniewski, Siromski, Skibniewski, Skobejka, Skobejko, Skorubko, Skorupka, Skorupko, Skotnicki, Skrodzki, Skrzetuski, Skwierczyński, Skwirczyński, Sławek, Sławiński, Sławomier, Słogocki, Sługocki, Smereczyński, Snacki, Sniciński, Sobolewski, Sokołowski, Sokowicz, Sołomiejewicz, Songajło, Sowiński, Spadowski, Spandowski, Spądowski, Spendowski, Spędowski, Sroczyński, Stachowski, Stalewski, Stański, Starzyński, Staszyński, Stąpaczewski, Strzelbicki, Styrbiński, Subczyński, Suchodolec, Suchodolski, Suchopiątek, Suchorzyński, Suchożyński, Surewicz, Surwiłło, Symborski, Symonowicz, Symunowicz, Synowicz, Syromski, Syrunowski, Szabuniewicz, Szandurowski, Szatyński, Szczepowski, Szczucki, Szemborski, Szemet, Szempleński, Szemplewski, Szempliński, Szepel, Szepelski, Szepietowski, Szeptyc, Szerenos, Szeronos, Szindler, Szklarski, Szlubowski, Szmaniewski, Szmigier, Szmigiero, Szmurło, Szuliborski, Szumanowski, Szumbarski, Szuplewicz, Szwander, Szymanowski, Szymański, Szymborski, Szymkiewicz, Szymonowski

=== Ś ===
Śkwierczyński, Śladowski, Ślepowroński, Ślubowski, Śniciński, Śnieciński, Świderski, Święcki

=== T ===
Taliszewski, Taraskowski, Taraszkowski, Tatarowski, Tecianiec, Teodorowicz, Terajewicz, Terajowicz, Terejewicz, Tietianiec, Topczewski, Treblicki, Trębicki, Trojnicki, Truskolaski, Truskolawski, Truskoleśny, Truskowski, Truszkowski, Trzciński, Trzyciński, Trzyszczyński, Twerjanowicz, Tyborowski, Tychowski, Tyrkszlewicz, Tyszarski

=== U ===
Ugoski, Ujazdowski, Ukrym, Ukryn, Uziemski

=== W ===
Wałkanowski, Warszycki, Wasianowicz, Wawrzecki, Wąsowicz, Wąsowicz-Dunin, Wąż, Wdziekuński, Wendrychowski, Werchracki, Werchratski, Wereszczatyński, Werycha, Weryha, Wębrychowski, Wędrychowski, Widmont, Wiercieński, Wierciński, Wierzbicki, Wierzchowski, Wilkołęski, Wilkowski, Wiszczycki, Wiszniowski, Wiścicki, Wocianc, Wocianiec, Wojciechowski, Wojdyłło, Wojdyło, Wojno, Wojsiatycz, Wolański, Wolęcki, Wolski, Worozhbet, Worozhbit, Woyno, Wrocki, Wronicki, Wroniecki, Wróblewski, Wróżbita, Wścieklica, Wyczałkowski, Wyczołkowski, Wyganowski, Wygnański, Wykrzykowski, Wyrzykowski, Wyskowski, Wyszkowski, Wyżykowski

=== Z ===
Zabawski, Zabierzowski, Zaborowski, Zafataj, Zaleceli, Zaleciłło, Zaleski, Zankowicz, Zapaśnik, Zarzycki, Zatorski, Zatowicz, Zaturski, Zawadzki, Zawałkiewicz, Zawidzki, Zawidzski, Zawisłowski, Zawodzki, Zbikowski, Zbyszyński, Zegzdro, Zelachowski, Zembocki, Zembowski, Zera, Zębocki, Zieleński, Zieleźnicki, Zieliński, Ziemborski, Zimnoch, Złotogórski, Zuk, Zyłłok-Kamieński, Zyra, Żak, Żarow, Żbikowski, Żelachowski, Żelechyński, Żeleźnicki, Żelkowski, Żera, Żero, Żerów, Żmiejewski, Żmiejowski, Żmijewski, Żmijowski, Żubrawski, Żuchawiecki, Żuchowiecki, Żuk, Żukowski, Żyłłok, Żyra, Żywult

== Notable bearers ==
- Stanisław Sebastian Bronicki
- Augustyn Kordecki
- Gabriel Rzączyński (1664–1737), Polish Jesuit priest and writer
- Kazimierz Pułaski
- Ignacy Szymański (1813-1872)
- Panteleimon Kulish (1819–1897) — Ukrainian writer, critic, poet, folklorist, and translator;
- Pavlo Teteria (1620s–1670) — Hetman of Right-bank Ukraine (1663–1665);
- Ignacy Mościcki President of Poland (1926–1939)
- Wojciech Jaruzelski President of Poland (1989–1990)
- Ekaterina Juskowski- Writer, art curator
- Tadeusz Kłopotowski Senator of Poland (1989–1991)
- Szymon Marcin Kossakowski
- Wincenty Krasiński (in France: comte Vincent Corvin-Krasinski)
- Kazimierz Krasiński
- Zygmunt Krasiński
- Tadeusz Gosiewski
- Grzegorz Skwierczyński
- Przemysław Skwirczyński
- Karol Szymanowski
- Henryk Lowmianski
- Chris Korwin-Kuczynski (21st century) Canadian politician
- Przemysław Gosiewski Deputy Prime Minister of Poland (2007)
- Łukasz Leończuk (1993)
- Romuald Niszcz (1963–2010), a Polish physicist.
- Otto von Corvin-Wierzbicki (in Germany Otto von Corvin also Otto von Corvin-Wierzbitzky)
- Walenty Nasierowski (1802–1888)
- Franciszek Krasiński (1525–1577), bishop

== Variations ==
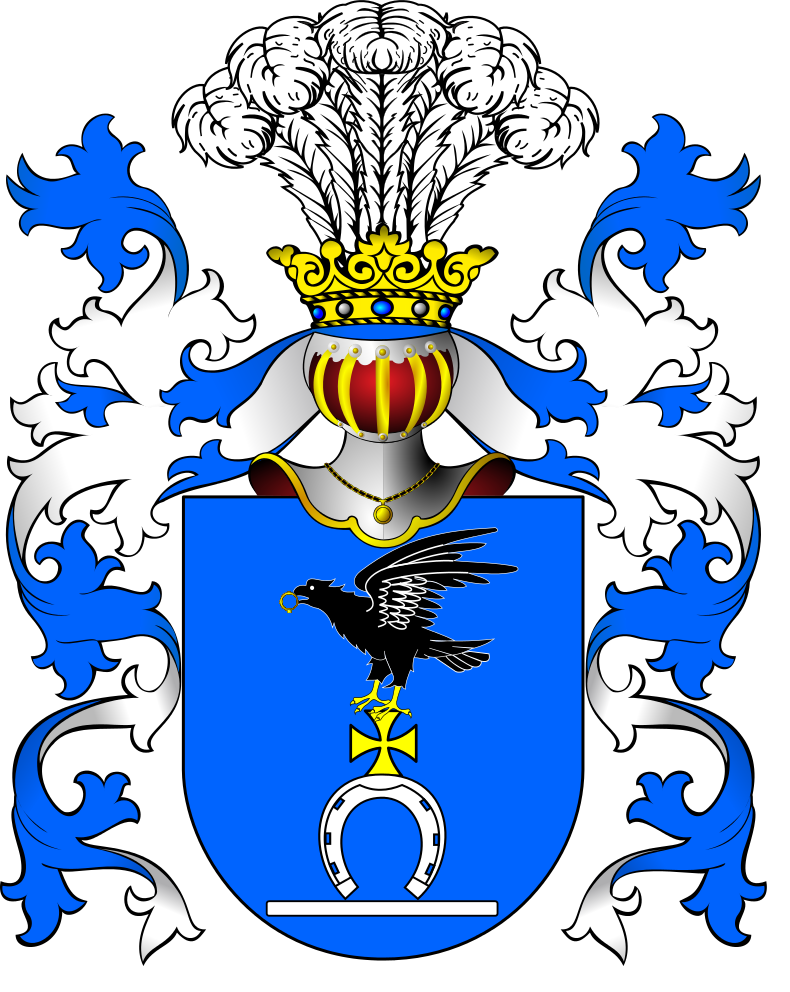
Czarnowron coat of arms

Korwin coat of arms

Kurowski coat of arms

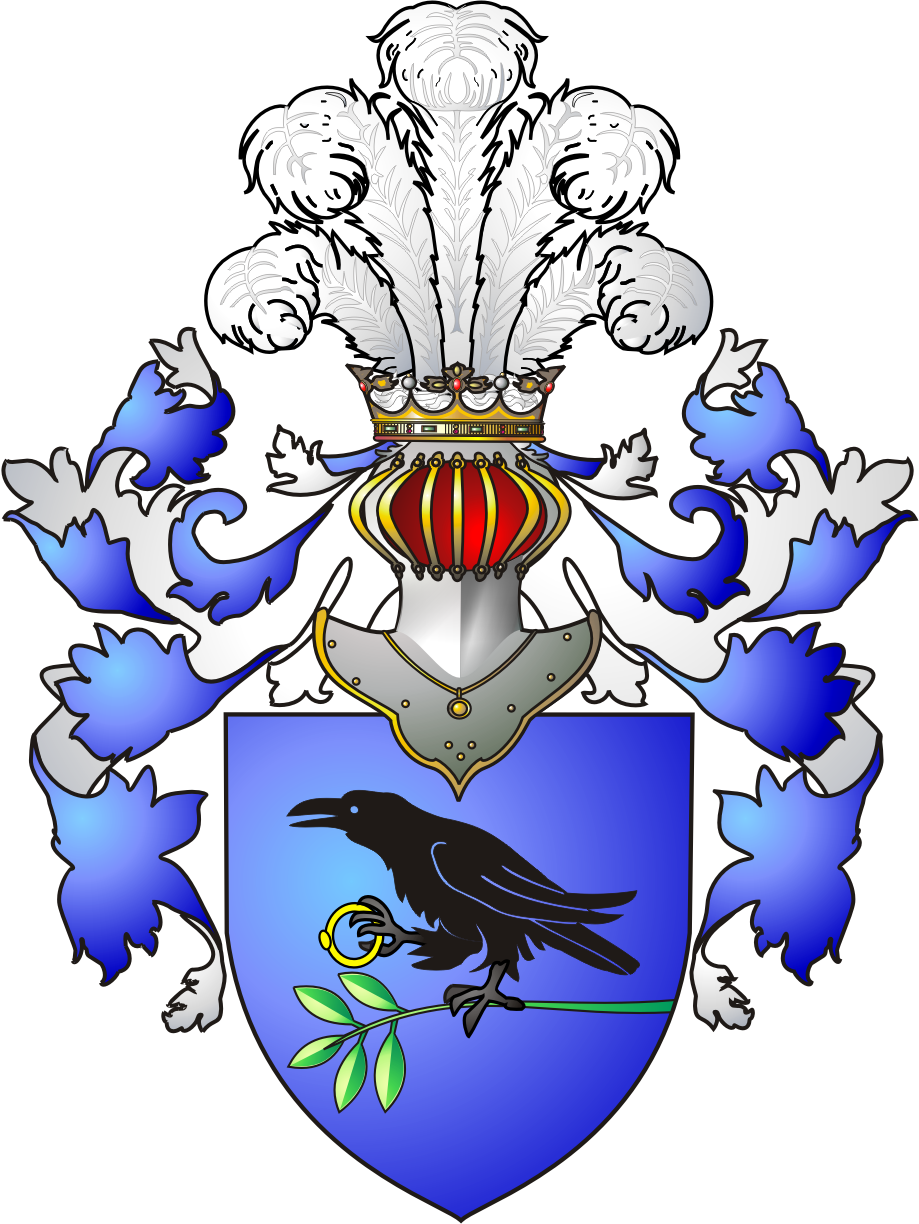
Materna coat of arms

Niszcz coat of arms

Rosyniec coat of arms

Sandrecki coat of arms

== Gallery ==
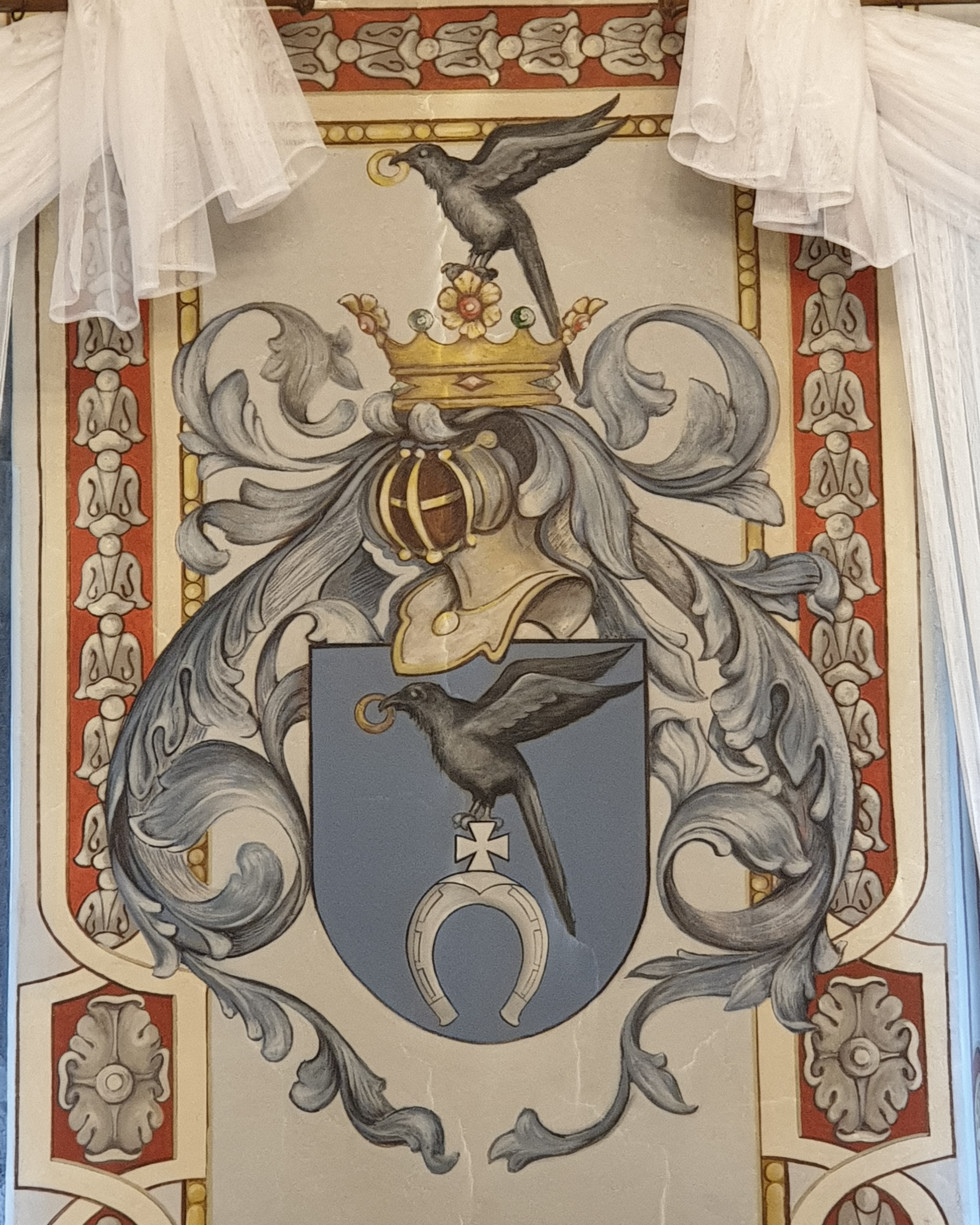

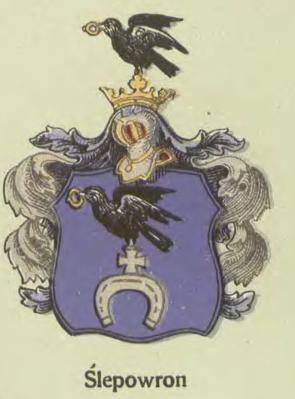

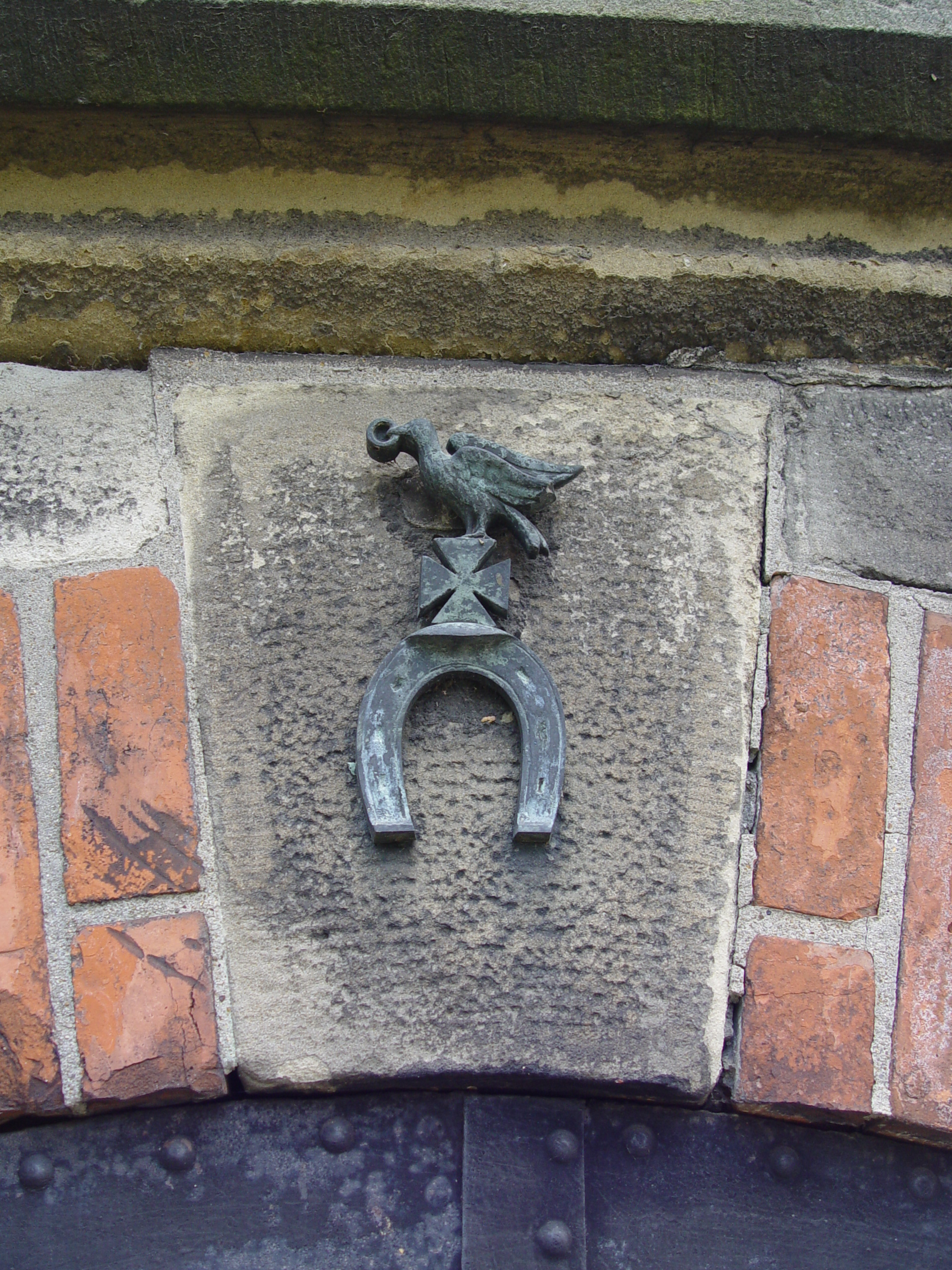

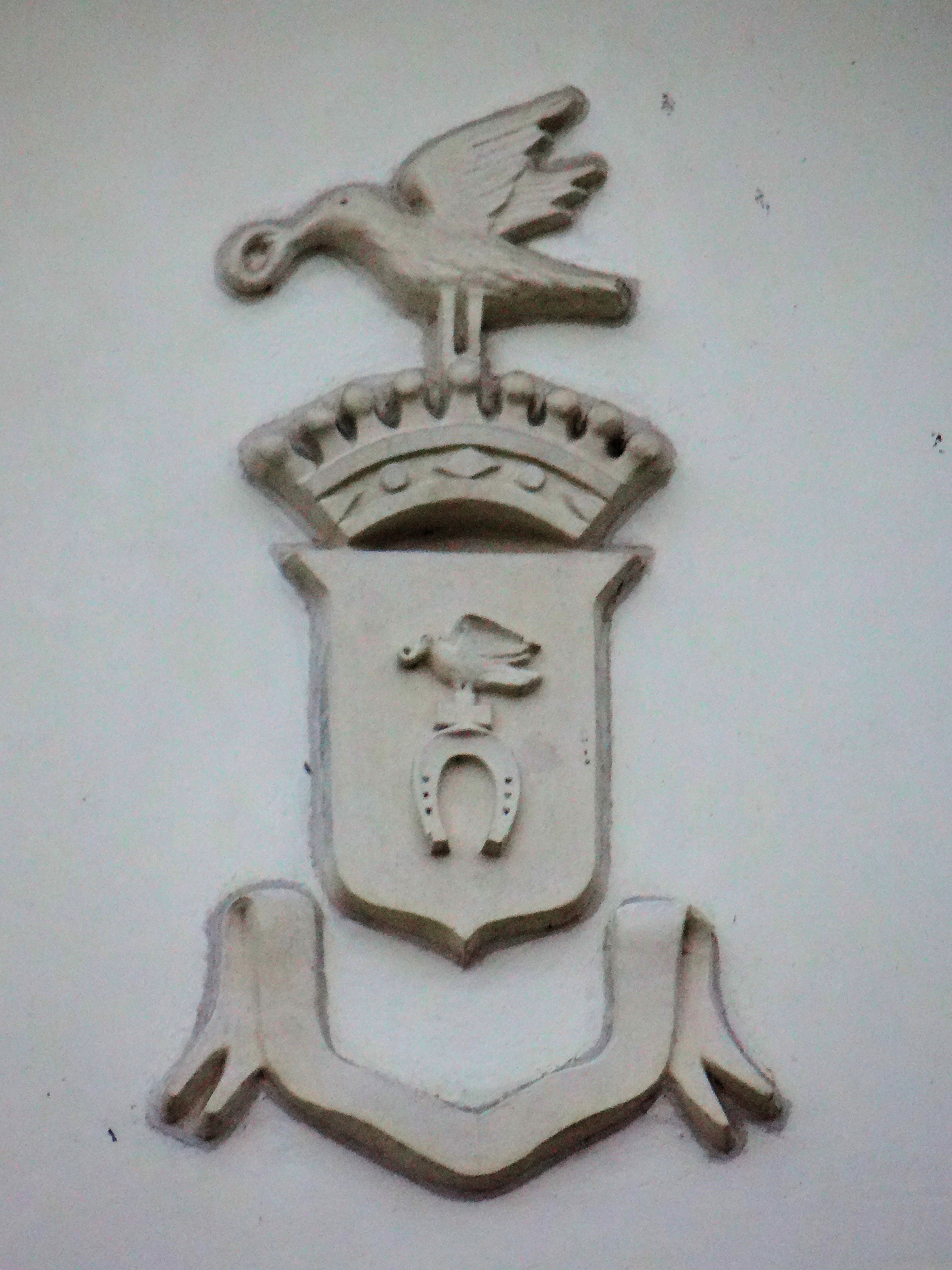

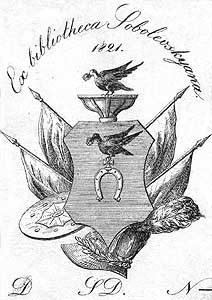

== See also ==
- Heraldry
- Coat of arms
- Polish heraldry
- Armorial of Polish nobility

== Literature ==
- Mănescu, Jean-Nicholas: Das Oswaldussymbol in der Wappenwelt Osteuropas. Tom C. Bergroth (edited): Genealogica & Heraldica. Report of The 16th International Congress of Genealogical and Heraldic Sciences in Helsinki 16–21 August 1984. Helsinki 1984, p. 415-424. ISBN 951-99640-4-5
