= Krzysztof Korwin Gosiewski =

Secretary of the Grand Duchy of Lithuania

- Coat of arms: Ślepowron
- Born: late 16th century
- Died: 1642
- Family: Gosiewski
- Father: Aleksander Korwin Gosiewski

Krzysztof Korwin Gosiewski de armis Ślepowron (died 1642) was the Palatine-Governor of Smolensk from 1639, Secretary of the Grand Duchy of Lithuania since 1638, Lithuanian Great-Quartermaster since 1625, District-Governor of Velizh and a diplomat. He was the son of Aleksander Korwin Gosiewski and Ewa Pac.

He took part in the ceremonial retinue of Prince Jerzy Ossoliński during his embassy in Rome in 1633. In 1638, King Władysław IV Vasa entrusted him with a diplomatic mission to France. His job was to negotiate the release of Prince Jan Kazimierz by the French. On 2 February 1640, he officially entered in Paris. After several weeks of negotiations, he managed to get relief the prince in exchange for a declaration that Poland-Lithuania will not be associated in a state of war with France. On 30 March, together with Jan Kazimierz he left the Bourbon capital. After returning to Poland–Lithuania he received the royal secretary Jan Kunowski who dedicated a book commemorating the achievements of his father, Aleksander Korwin Gosiewski.
