= Mikołaj Krzysztof Sapieha =

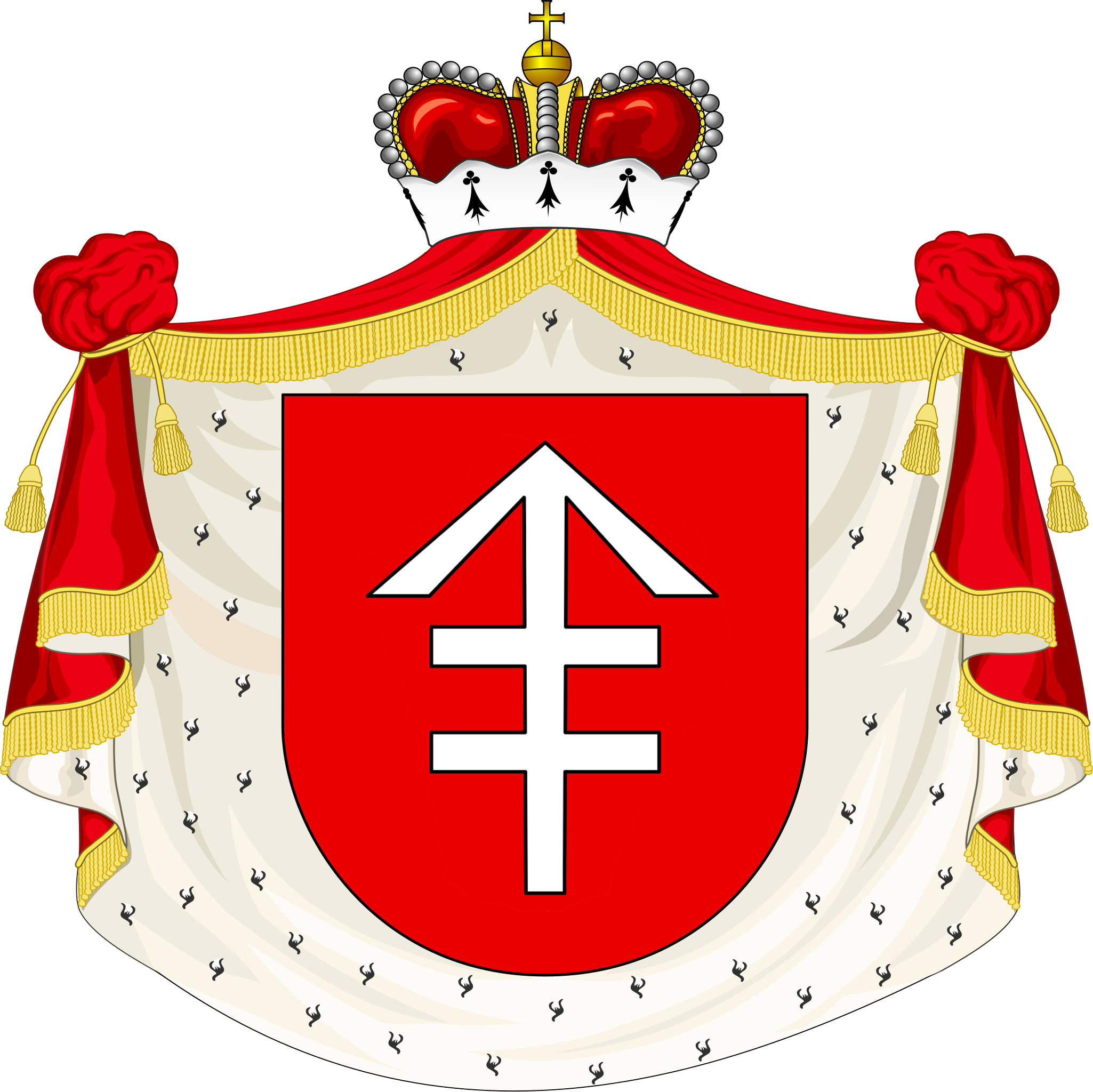
Coat of arms of Sapieha

Mikołaj Krzysztof Sapieha (Lithuanian: Mykalojus Kristupas Sapiega; 1613–1639) of Lis coat of arms, was the Voivode of Nowogródek (1618–38), Voivode of Mińsk (1638–39), Notary of Lithuania since 1637 in the Polish–Lithuanian Commonwealth. Mikołaj Krzysztof Sapieha was a marshal of the main tribunal of the Grand Duchy of Lithuania in 1638.

Mikolaj was the son of Krzysztof Stefan Sapieha and Anna Hołowczyńska. He was married to Zuzanna Korwin Gosiewska, and was the father of Jerzy Sapieha and Anna Sapieha.

His death is alleged to have been caused by poison, administered by his wife.
