= Czarniecki =

Czarniecki (Polish pronunciation: [tʂarˈɲɛtski]; feminine: Czarniecka; plural: Czarnieccy) is a surname of Polish language origin. It belongs to the noble Czarniecki family. It is a toponymic surname for someone from Czarnca in Kielce voivodeship, or any of the various places called Czarnocin or Czarnia, all derived from the Polish adjective "czarny", which means 'black'.

The surname may refer to:

- Krzysztof Czarniecki
- Stefan Czarniecki (1599–1665), Polish military commander

== See also ==
- Czerniecki
- Charnieski
