= Czarnecki =

Czarnecki (Polish pronunciation: [tʂarˈnɛtski]; feminine Czarnecka; plural Czarneccy) is a Polish surname. Notable people with the surname include:

- Arkadiusz Czarnecki (born 1987), Polish footballer
- Joanna Czarnecka (born 1982), Polish basketball player
- Karen Czarnecki, American politician
- Kazimierz Czarnecki (weightlifter) (born 1948), Polish weightlifter
- Kazimierz Czarnecki (engineer) (1916–2005), Polish aeronautics engineer
- Krzysztof Czarnecki (born 1957), Polish politician
- Marek Czarnecki (born 1959), Polish politician
- Ryszard Czarnecki (born 1963), Polish politician
- Witold Czarnecki (born 1953), Polish politician

== See also ==
- Czarniecki
- Przemysław Czarnek (born 1977), Polish politician, minister of education and science in 2020
- Chernetsky
