= Battle of Jarosław (1656) =

1656 battle

Coordinates: 50°01′00″N 22°40′00″E

- Part of the Northern War of 1655–1660 and the Deluge
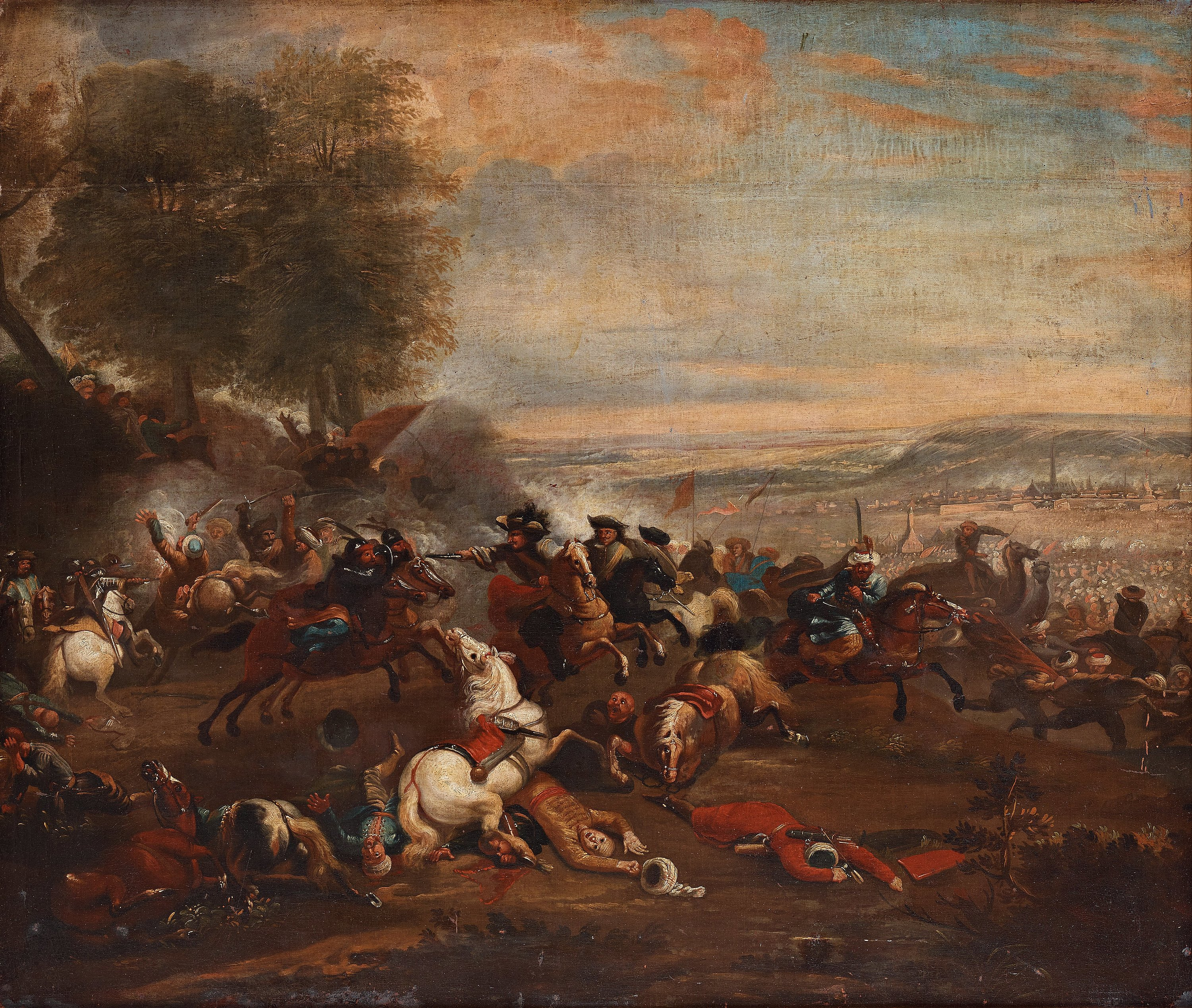
Date	March 15, 1656
Location	Jarosław, Poland
Result	Polish-Lithuanian victory

Belligerents
Polish–Lithuanian Commonwealth	Swedish Empire

Commanders and leaders
(Polish–Lithuanian Commonwealth) Stefan Czarniecki (Polish–Lithuanian Commonwealth) Jerzy Lubomirski	(Swedish Empire) Charles X Gustav (Swedish Empire) Robert Douglas (Swedish Empire) Peter Hammerskjold

Strength
Unknown	At least 1,000 men

Casualties and losses
Small	Heavy

The Battle of Jarosław took place during the Deluge (part of the Second Northern War) on March 15, 1656. Polish-Lithuanian Commonwealth forces under the command of Stefan Czarniecki defeated the Swedish forces commanded by Charles X Gustav of Sweden.

After the Battle of Golab, the Swedish army under King Charles X Gustav marched towards Lwow, where Polish forces concentrated, and where King John Casimir stayed. In early March 1656, Charles X Gustav received news that up to 20,000 Polish-Lithuanian soldiers concentrated in Red Ruthenia. The Swedish King realized that his forces were not adequate to face the enemy, so he ordered a retreat towards the San river. Furthermore, the Swedes were constantly attacked by Polish guerrilla forces.

On March 11, first Swedish units reached the town of Jaroslaw, where they defeated a regiment of Hetman Jerzy Sebastian Lubomirski, which guarded the river crossings. Soon afterwards, the division of Stefan Czarniecki arrived in the area, surprising the Swedes, as they thought it had been destroyed in the Battle of Golab.

In a skirmish, which took place near Wielkie Oczy, Czarniecki destroyed a 1,000 strong unit of the reiters, commanded by Colonel Peter Hammerskjold. Then he attacked Robert Douglas, Count of Skenninge, who came to rescue the reiters. The skirmish ended in a Swedish defeat, and Douglas with his soldiers fled to Jaroslaw. Soon afterwards, Czarniecki attacked the town itself, clashing with Swedish guards, who oversaw labourers working on improvements of the town fortifications. Since Charles Gustav was well aware of Czarniecki's presence, he called reinforcements from units stationed in local villages. Arrival of main Swedish forces resulted in Polish retreat into the local forests.

The battle, or rather the series of skirmishes, had a significant impact on those Polish units, which still remained loyal to Charles Gustav. After the battle, several such regiments abandoned the Swedes, while Charles Gustav came to the conclusion that a further march towards southeast was fruitless. A tactical retreat towards Sandomierz was ordered, and soon afterwards, the Swedish army was encircled in the confluence of the San and the Vistula.
