= Andrzej Opaliński =

Andrzej Opaliński can refer to two Polish–Lithuanian nobles:

- Andrzej Opaliński (1540–1593), Great Crown Marshal
- Andrzej Opaliński (1575–1623), bishop of Poznań
