= Battle of Nisko =

1656 battle in the Swedish invasion of Poland

- Part of the Second Northern War / The Deluge
Date	March 28, 1656
Location	Nisko, Poland
Result	Swedish victory

Belligerents
Swedish Empire	Polish–Lithuanian Commonwealth

Commanders and leaders
(Swedish Empire) Charles X Gustav	(Polish–Lithuanian Commonwealth) Stefan Czarniecki

Strength
Unknown	Unknown

Casualties and losses
200–300 killed and captured	1,200 killed

The Battle of Nisko was one of battles of the Swedish invasion of Poland that took place on March 28, 1656. It resulted in a victory of Swedish forces, commanded by King Charles X Gustav.

The battle took place during a Swedish raid of southern part of the Kingdom of Poland, in which King Charles X Gustav tried to finally destroy Polish forces loyal to King John II Casimir Vasa. The badly organized Swedish campaign was terminated after the Battle of Jaroslaw, when Charles X Gustav ordered a retreat toward central Poland. At the same time, Polish forces concentrated near Lwow began guerrilla attacks on the Swedish Army. The retreat took place in adverse weather conditions, and Swedish losses were high.

On March 28, 1656, the Swedish Army camped near Nisko. Hungry soldiers began combing the area in search of food, while those sick and wounded remained at lightly guarded camp. Stefan Czarniecki decided to take advantage of this, and his cavalry entered the camp. Alarm was raised by Swedish drummers, and units which had scattered in the countryside returned to camp.

According to the plan, a Polish unit under Colonel Aleksander Hilary Polubinski was to attack the camp from the rear. However, due to a misunderstanding, Polubinski failed to appear at Nisko. Therefore, after some time, a Polish division faced entire Swedish Army. Czarniecki’s forces were forced to flee, and the Hetman was almost captured by the enemy. The Polish plan failed, while Swedish soldiers once again proved their professionalism. Nevertheless, after the skirmish, remaining Polish banners, loyal to Charles Gustav, switched sides and returned their allegiance to John II Casimir Vasa. A few days later, the Swedish Army was blocked by Poles and Lithuanians in the confluence of the Vistula and San river.

== Sources ==
- Miroslaw Nagielski, Warszawa 1656, Wydawnictwo Bellona, Warszawa 1990, ISBN 83-11-07786-X
- Leszek Podhorodecki, Rapier i koncerz, Warszawa 1985, ISBN 83-05-11452-X
- J. Levin Carlbom. Karl X Gustafs Polska Krig och Öfvergången till det 2ndra Sundskriget. Göteborg, Centraltryckeriet, Oscar Ericson.
