= Stefan Czarniecki =

Polish nobleman and general (1599–1665)

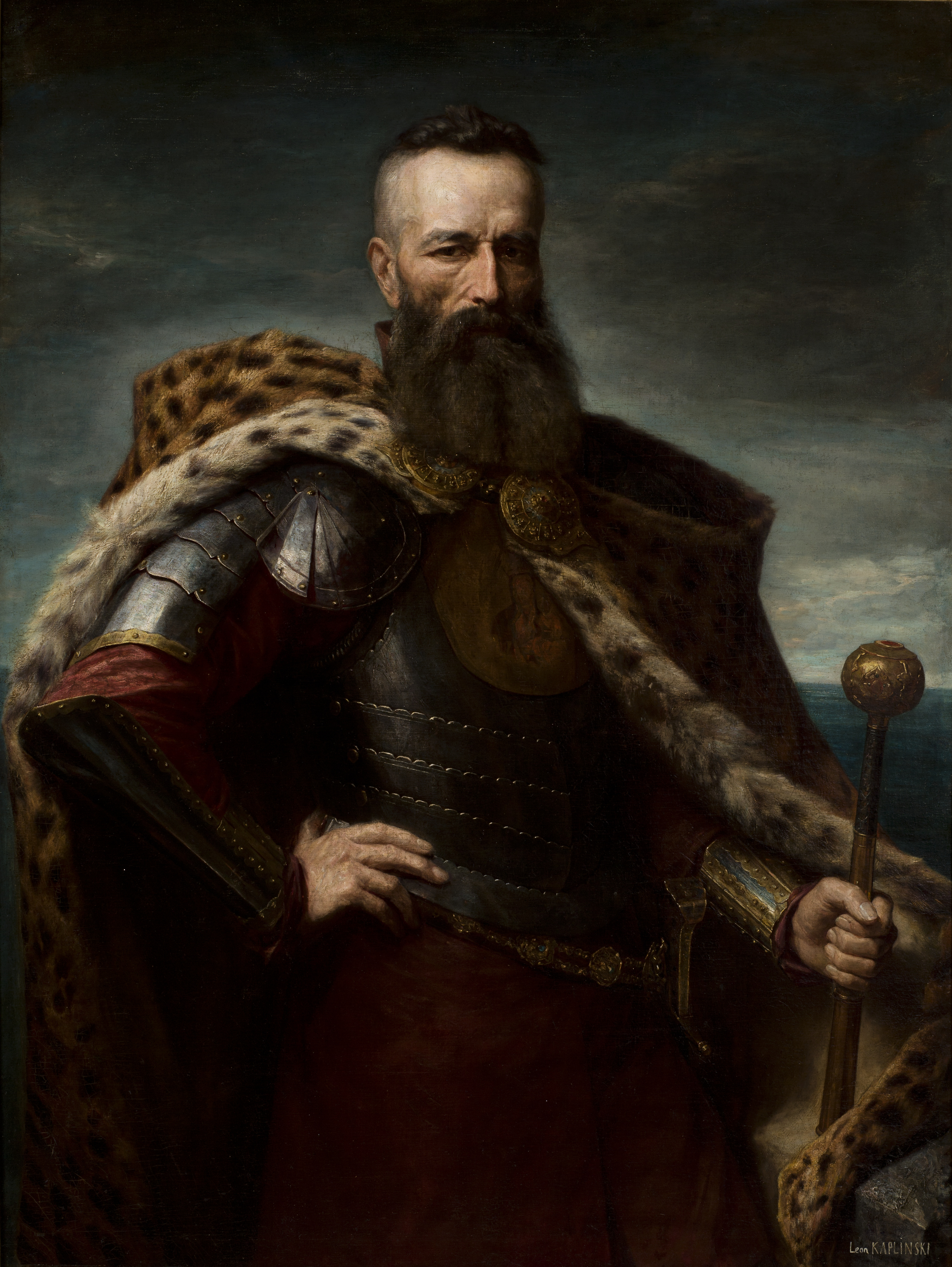
- Portrait by Leon Kapliński, 1863

- Coat of arms
- Born: 1599; Czarnca, Polish–Lithuanian Commonwealth
- Died: 16 February 1665 (aged 65–66); Sokołówka, Polish–Lithuanian Commonwealth
- Noble family: House of Czarniecki
- Spouse: Zofia Kobierzycka
- Issue: Aleksandra Katarzyna; Konstancja Joanna
- Father: Krzysztof Czarniecki
- Mother: Krystyna Rzeszowska

Stefan Czarniecki of the Łodzia coat of arms ([ˈstɛfan t͡ʂarˈɲɛt͡skʲi]; 1599 – 16 February 1665) was a Polish nobleman, general and military commander. In his career, he rose from a petty nobleman to a magnate holding one of the highest offices in the Commonwealth, something that was unprecedented in the Commonwealth's history. On 22 July 1664 he received the office of the Voivode of Kijów and on 2 January 1665, a few weeks before his death, he was given the office of Field Hetman (one of the top military commanders) of the Crown of the Polish Kingdom. He is remembered as an accomplished military commander and regarded as a Polish national hero. His status in Polish history is acknowledged by a mention of his name in the Polish national anthem.

Czarniecki made significant contributions fighting the Khmelnytsky Uprising, during the Russo-Polish War, and during the Polish–Swedish War (The Deluge). His use of guerrilla warfare against the Swedes is credited as one of the main reasons for the eventual Polish success in this war.

== Biography ==
=== Early career ===
Stefan Czarniecki was born in 1599 on the family estate of Czarnca near Włoszczowa in southern Poland, into the szlachta (nobility) Czarniecki family. The date of his birth is only an assumption, as no documents exist to prove it without a doubt; most historians, as noted by historians Leszek Podhorodecki and Adam Kersten, accept the 1599 date, although historian Zdzisław Spieralski argued for 1604. His father, Krzysztof Czarniecki, was a soldier who participated in several wars in the late 16th and early 17th century, and eventually became a courtier to Polish queen Constance of Austria. Whereas historian Mirosław Nagielski notes that the Czarniecki family was not well off, which limited some of Stefan's life chances, Podhorecki points out that they owned several villages and even a small town, and the family wealth was "not small". However, Stefan had ten siblings (he himself was the sixth out of nine brothers), and divided into that many parts, the family resources would be stretched rather thinly. However, involvement with the queen's court allowed Krzysztof to boost his sons' careers with his court influence, where they were often able to serve as young courtiers themselves.

Nothing is known about Stefan's childhood. His family could not afford to send him to a university abroad (only one of his brothers would do so); therefore, he embarked on a military career at an early age. Before that, he attended a Jesuit college, either in Kraków or Sandomierz, achieving a solid secondary education. After finishing his schooling, he became a courtier to then-royal prince and future king of Poland John II Casimir Vasa. As Stefan could not afford the equipment needed to join a hussar unit, he learned the art of war serving with the Lisowczycy mercenaries, joining them as towarzysz (companion, a junior cavalry officer) in the spring of 1621. Already an officer at the age of eighteen, he took part in the battle of Chocim (Khotyn) in 1621, where the Commonwealth army stopped the Ottomans and ended the Polish–Ottoman War (1620–1621). His years with the brutal Lisowczycy mercenaries would impact his strategy in the latter years, where he would not hesitate to use any means necessary – including mistreatment of civilians – to achieve victory.

The next time he took arms was in 1623, when his brother Paweł received a nomination as a rotmistrz of light (cossack) cavalry of the regular army (wojsko kwarciane), and recruited some of his siblings, including Stefan, into his unit. They served under hetman Stanisław Koniecpolski in the campaigns against the Tatars in 1624 (participating in the battle of Martynów). In 1625 they took part in the quelling of a Cossack Zhmaylo Uprising. He fought later against Gustavus Adolphus (1626–1629) (part of the Polish–Swedish War). His light cavalry was used in reconnaissance, diversion, and raiding the enemy territory. In 1627, Stefan, serving in his brother's chorągiew, was promoted to chorąży. On 6–7 August that year, he participated in the battle of Tczew, where Gustavus Adolphus was nearly killed. During those years, he learned much from observing a master of military arts, hetman Koniecpolski, who often commanded the Polish army in which he served, and from Poland's Swedish opponents, and earlier from the Cossacks and Tatars they fought.

As the Polish–Swedish war ended, in 1630, Czarniecki enlisted in the Habsburg forces and continued to fight against the Swedes, participating in the battle of Breitenfeld. In 1633 he joined the Commonwealth forces again, to fight under the new Polish king, Władysław IV Waza, in the Smolensk War against Muscovy that lasted until 1634. During the Smolensk War, he learned Western tactics used by the foreign mercenary troops. In December 1633 he commanded a raiding unit that successfully raided and pillaged behind the Russian lines, spreading terror, disrupting supply lines, and burning down the town of Kozelsk. For his achievements in that war, in which he advanced to a porucznik rank in the light "cossack" cavalry unit under hetman Marcin Kazanowski, he received some land in the Smolensk Voivodeship near Starodub.

After that war, he moved to a more prestigious hussar unit (rota), and likely due to a reduction of the royal army, he served in the private formation of Władysław Myszkowski and later, voivode Stanisław Lubomirski. In 1635 he might have served as a military adviser to John II Casimir Vasa, and possibly accompanied the king to Vienna. In 1637 he married Zofia Kobierzycka, and later that year he fought in the Pawluk Uprising against the rebellious Cossacks under Pavel Mikhnovych, participating in the Battle of Kumeyki. He led a cavalry charge at Kumeyki which was instrumental in the Polish victory there. Earlier that year, he served as a military delegate to the Sejm (parliament) in Warsaw.

=== Struggles against the Cossacks ===
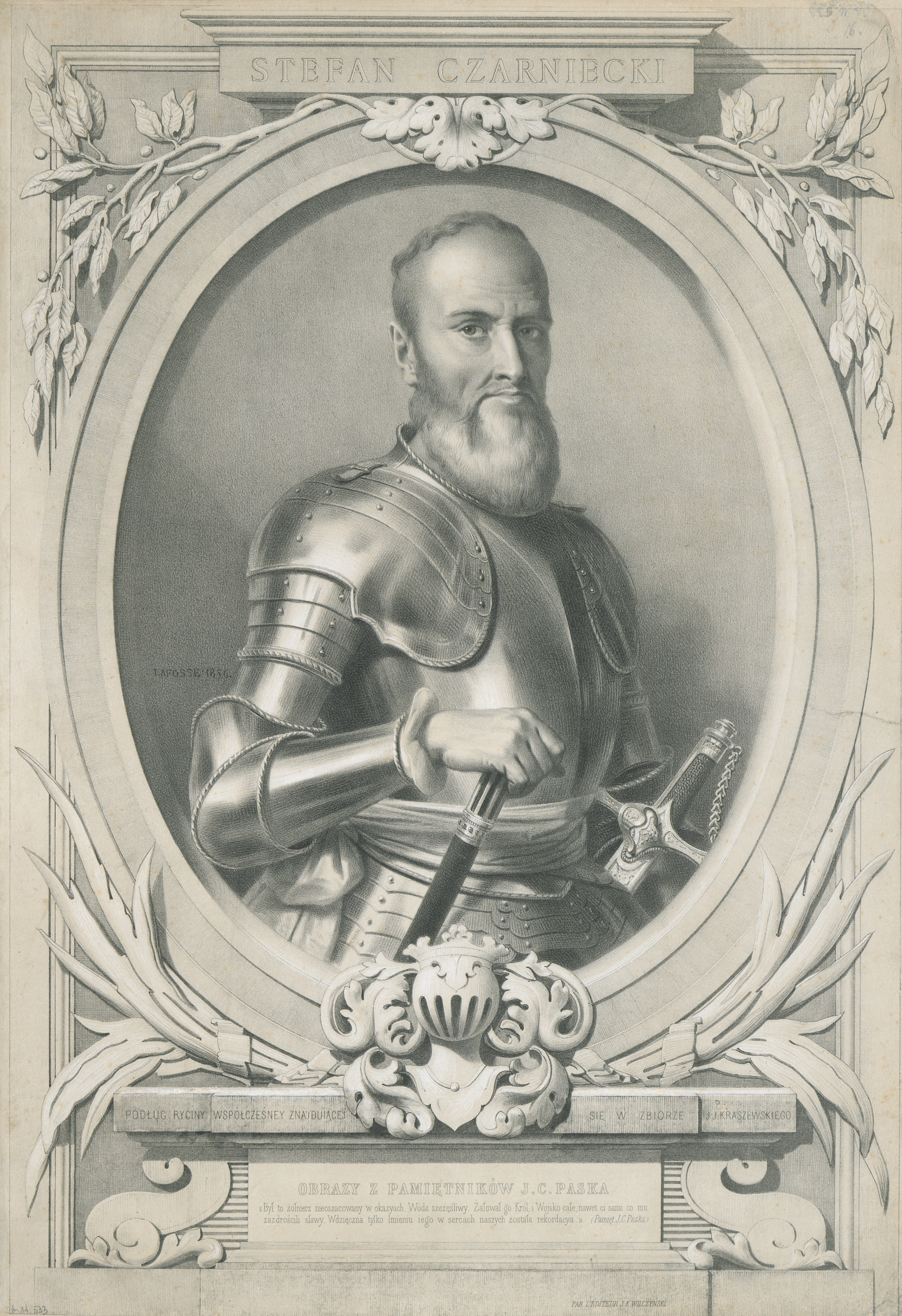
Stefan Czarniecki

For the next several years he would serve on the hostility-plagued south-eastern border, where he made his home in the city of Illńce. In 1644 under Koniecpolski he took part in the battle of Okhmativ where Commonwealth forces dealt a crushing defeat to Toğay bey's (Tuhaj Bej) Tatars. He served as one of seven pułkowniks in Koniecpolski's army, and once again his cavalry unit charge proved to be a decisive moment of the battle, bringing him much fame. That year, he also became a regimentarz in his own light cavalry unit, but he still held the rank of a porucznik of hussars.

He took an active part in the battles against the Cossacks in the Khmelnytsky Uprising. On 16 May 1648, he was one of the many noble Polish prisoners who fell into the hands of Bohdan Khmelnytsky at the battle of Zhovti Vody, but he was quickly ransomed. He participated in the defense of the Kudak Fortress, which surrendered on 26 September; he was once again captured and not released until the autumn of 1649, in the aftermath of the Treaty of Zboriv. He served as a porucznik in the hussar chorągiew of hetman Mikołaj Potocki, a military judge deputized by the hetman, and a member of his staff, meeting with the new king of Poland, John Casimir Vasa. He was part of the fighting at the battle of Berestechko and battle of Bila Tserkva in 1651. He received the title of chorąży of Sandomierz, and was elected the military deputy for the Sejm in January 1652. According to Nagielski, Czarniecki, while returning from the Sejm, witnessed the massacre of Polish prisoners in the aftermath of the battle of Batoh; This scene made him reject the notions that a compromise with the enemies of the Commonwealth was a likely or desired outcome. Podhorodecki however notes that another historian, Wojciech Jacek Długołęcki, questions Czarniecki's presence there, and concludes that we have no conclusive proof whether Czarniecki was present at Batoh, The massacre further escalated the hostilities and the surrounding hatred; illustrating that in a letter Czarniecki wrote soon after the battle, in which he promised that if enough military forces are gathered and given to him, he will leave few Ruthenians alive.

Later that year Czarniecki received territories from the king, along with the office of Crown oboźny. In 1653 he led a unit to Ukraine, ransacking much of the Cossack-held lands, although the attrition among the troops was high. During that campaign Czarniecki was wounded at Monastyryshsche. He continued his suppression campaign in 1654, and the following January took part in the battle of Okhmativ. In May 1655 he was called from Ukraine to Warsaw, as the king John Casimir Vasa, respected his experience and requested his presence at a new war council, convened to discuss the looming thread of the war with Sweden. At that time his reputation was significant; Sejm often passed resolutions applauding him for his efforts to reclaim Ukraine, and he was even held in much consideration by the Ottomans, then temporarily allied with the Commonwealth. On 14 May 1655 he received the office of the castellan of Kiev, a position that made him a member of the Senate of Poland.

=== The Swedish Deluge ===
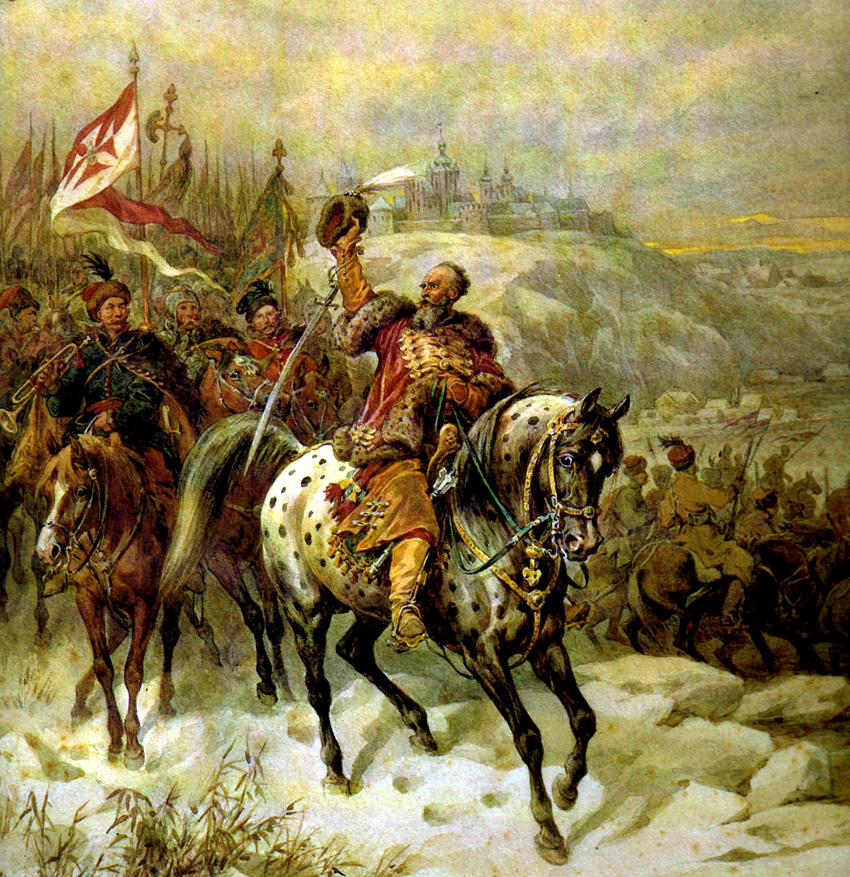
Czarniecki near Płock, painting by Juliusz Kossak

When Charles X of Sweden invaded Poland in 1655, Czarniecki distinguished himself by his defence of Kraków, which he eventually surrendered on good terms, retreating with his army. He remained loyal to the Polish king, even when much of the army, including most of the senators and the hetmans, temporarily joined the Swedes. His vocal support for the wavering king, who at that time found refuge abroad, and was considering abdication, was decisive. For his continuing support, the Polish king rewarded him with more lands and the office of regimentarz of the royal army.

He led guerrilla warfare against Swedish troops of Charles X, a type of a campaign he authored, despite the objections of the hetmans, who by that time returned to serve under John Casimir Vasa. The mobile Swedish forces, even with their significant firepower, proved to be rather vulnerable to Czarniecki's guerrilla-style warfare. Czarniecki was defeated at the battle of Gołąb in mid-February 1656, but later inflicted serious defeats upon the Swedes, notably at the Battle of Warka in April that year. The tide of the war turned several times that year, and he was again defeated at the battle of Kłecko and battle of Kscynia. His defeats, however, were limited, and in most cases he was able to retreat with most of his army in good order. Under his direction the popular rising against the Swedish troops in Greater Poland proved highly successful. It was against his advice that the battle of Warsaw was fought, and his subsequent strategy neutralized the ill effects of this defeat. Despite support from the king, Czarniecki was seen by many older, established noble family as an arrogant newcomer, and they prevented him from getting the hetman office that year; instead early next year he received the office of the voivode of Ruthenia, and an extraordinary title of the "general and vice commander of the royal forces", which put him in a position of an unofficial hetman-like authority. The Field Crown Hetmanship went to Jerzy Sebastian Lubomirski, also an accomplished commander, if not so much as Czarniecki – but from a magnate Lubomirski family; Czarniecki commented famously that "Not of salt, or fields, I am, but from what hurts me", alluding to the fact that Lubormirski family built its fortune on salt trade and agriculture, whereas his smaller one was built through military service – yet it was money and politics, not military experience, that decided who was to get the hetman's office.

=== Final battles ===
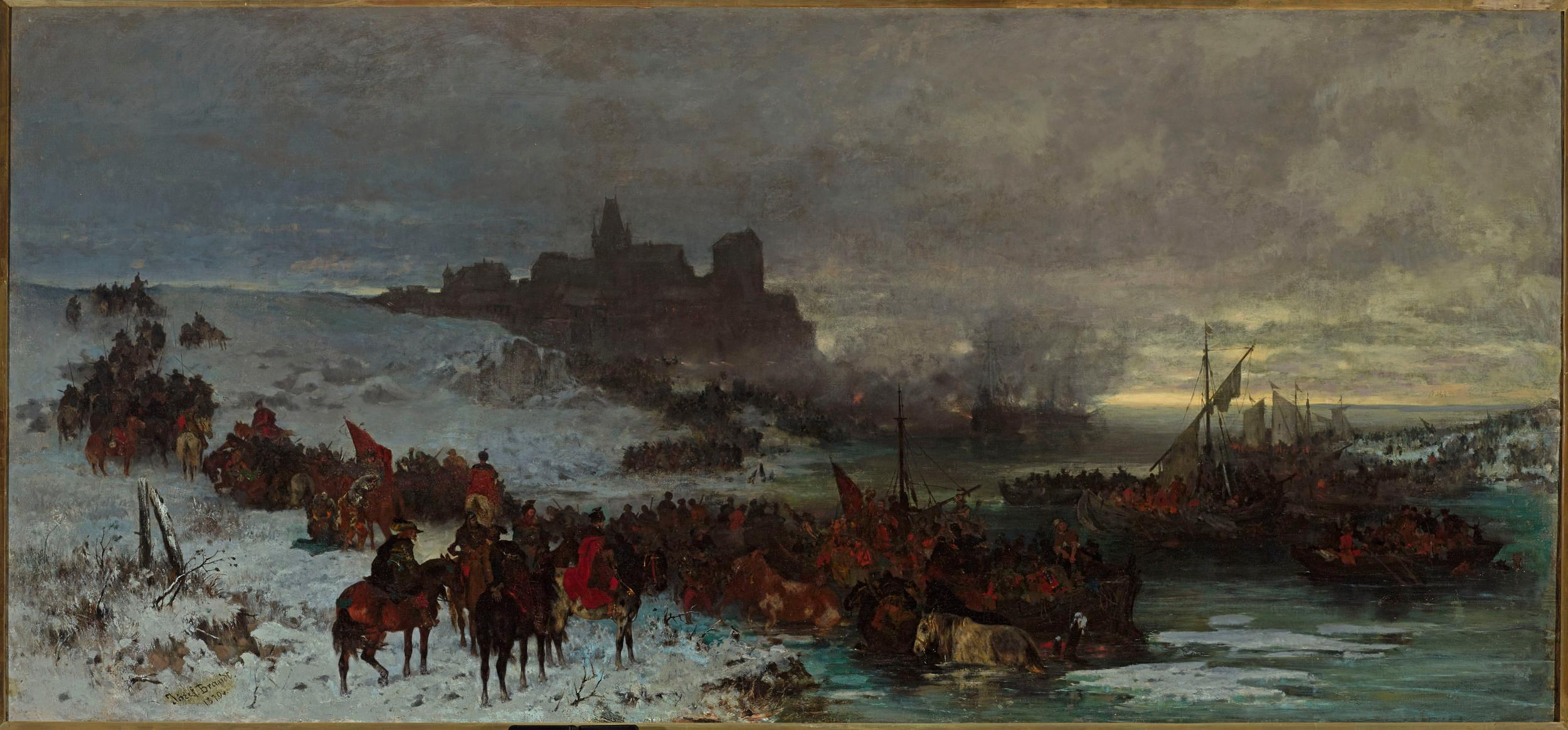
Czarniecki at the battle of Kolding. Painting by Józef Brandt.

In 1657 he was instrumental in defeating the forces of George II Rákóczi at the battle of Magierów. In 1658 and 1659 he aided Danes during the Danish–Swedish War, fighting at Als and at the battle of Kolding.

On the conclusion of the Peace of Oliwa, which adjusted the long outstanding differences between Poland and Sweden, Czarniecki was transferred to the eastern frontier where the war with Russia reignited. He distinguished himself in the campaign of 1660, where he won the victories of the battle of Połonka and battle of Kuszliki. This campaign, however, marked the zenith of his popularity. King John II Casimir Vasa attempted to involve him in the unpopular plan of vivente rege – to bypass the traditions of the royal elections in Poland and instead chose the next successor to the Polish throne (John II Casimir favored Louis, Grand Condé) still during the life of the previous king. His reputation among the unpaid and dissenting military took a dive; and many criticized him for appropriating the entire ransom that the Russians paid for their prisoners from Połonka. During the Sejm of 1662 some military representatives demanded sanctions and punishments to be levied on him.

His last campaign took place at the end of 1664. He led an army against the Russians, but the Siege of Hlukhiv was not successful, and a new Cossack uprising of Ivan Sirko forced the Polish troops to fall back.

On 22 July 1664 he received the office of the voivode of Kiev, and on 2 January 1665 he was appointed Field Crown Hetman. Before receiving the news of the nomination he desired for years, he was wounded at Lysianka. Called back by the king, who feared that magnate Jerzy Sebastian Lubomirski that he just banished might start a rebellion, his recent wound became infected, and he died on 16 February 1665 in Sokołówka (now Sokolívka) near Lwów, six weeks after receiving this supreme distinction.

== Legacy ==
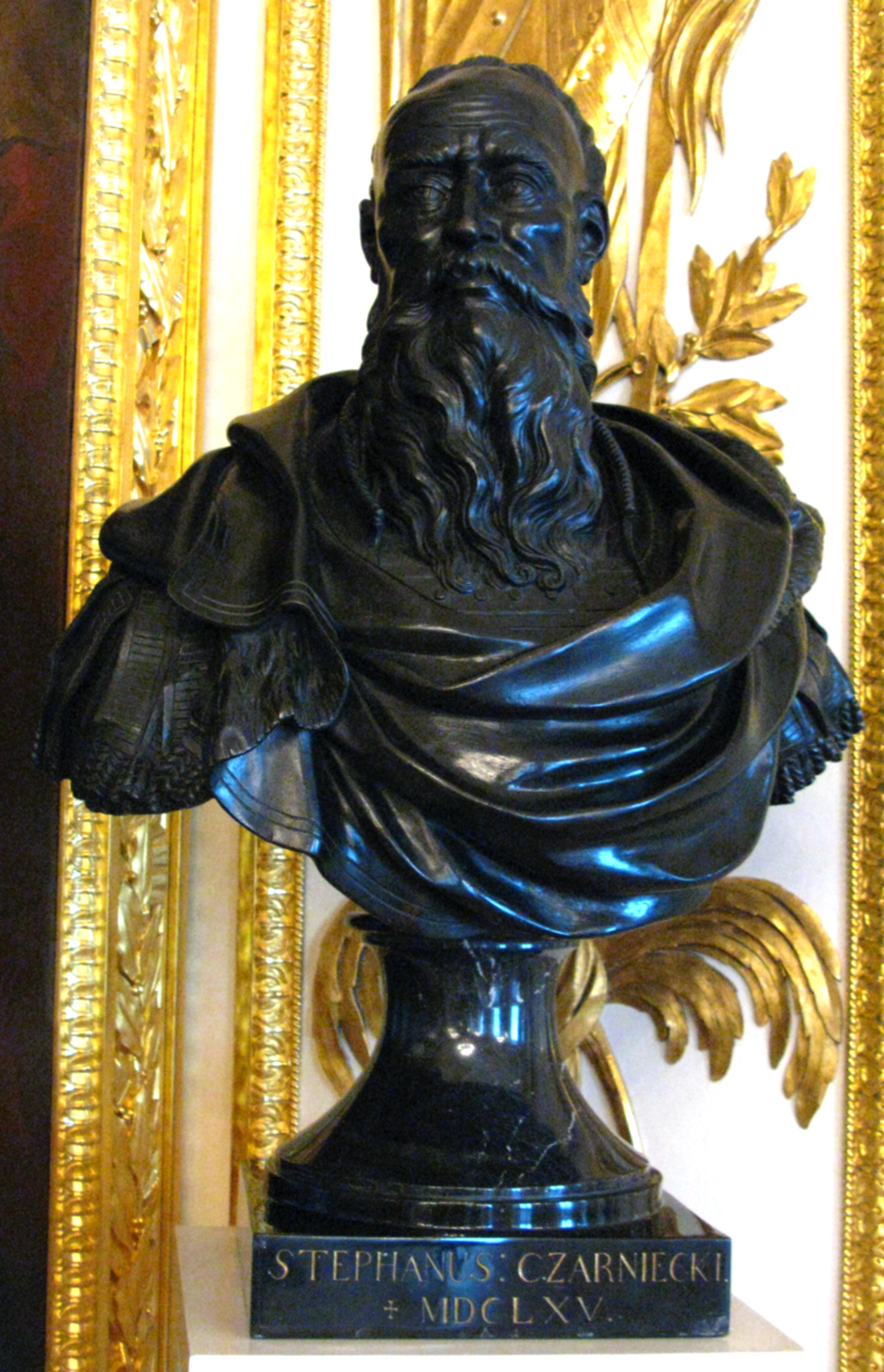
A bust of Czarniecki by André Lebrun, held in Royal Castle, Warsaw.

Czarniecki received a state funeral in Warsaw, and has been interred in the tomb chapel of the church founded by him in Czarnca. He left his estates to a nephew, Stefan Stanisław Czarniecki, but the Czarniecki name did not last long, and the wealth he gathered became instead the foundation of the Branicki family of magnates.

Czarniecki is remembered as one of the most able Polish commanders of all time. Podhorecki called him the greatest Polish military expert in "hit-and-run tactics", and notes that he was the longest-serving of the major Polish military commanders of his era, that he participated in 27 large battles, commanding 17 of them. He is seen as instrumental in defeating the Swedes during the Deluge, although he was even more successful in his battles against the Russians. His career, rising from a simple noble family to the rank of a hetman and a wealthy magnate, was unprecedented in the Commonwealth's history.

Mazurek Dąbrowskiego (Dąbrowski's Mazurek)
3rd strophe

Jak Czarniecki do Poznania
Po szwedzkim zaborze,
Dla ojczyzny ratowania
Wrócim się przez morze.

As Czarniecki to Poznań
After the Swedish occupation,
To save our homeland
We will return across the sea.

His legend had begun growing even during his lifetime, as he became a hero of poems and songs. Few negative rumors about him, popular in the last few years of his life, survived after his death. During the period of Enlightenment in Poland, he was written about by poets and writers such as Stanisław Rewera Potocki, Franciszek Karpiński, Julian Ursyn Niemcewicz and Franciszek Ksawery Dmowski. A biography by Michał Krajewski cemented his legend of a hero rescuing Poland from anarchy and invasion. That legend that became even stronger during the times of the partitions of Poland in the 19th century, where the artists of the Polish romanticism period used him as a symbol of patriotism, and a reminder of military successes. He appears in the poem Przedświt of Zygmunt Krasiński, but much more significant was his portrayal in The Trilogy of Henryk Sienkiewicz, particularly the second book, The Deluge.

It was during that time that his pursuit of the retreating Swedes to Pomerania and Denmark (1658–1659), particularly his crossing with his entire army to the Danish isle of Alsen, was commemorated in the song of the Polish Napoleonic Legions that would eventually become the Polish national anthem, the "Dąbrowski's Mazurka", with the words commemorating his marine excursion to the island of Als: It was only during the time of the Second Polish Republic when more modern, serious historical work begun analyzing his history that a less hagiographic account begun emerging; Władysław Czapliński wrote that Czarniecki was "first and foremost a soldier", and noted his faults such as brutality and greed. Modern historiography of Czarniecki includes works of Czapliński, Stanisław Herbst, Adam Kersten and Zdzisław Spieralski; however Podhorecki notes that while he has been a major figure in the Polish history, and is discussed extensively in Polish historiography, he has never been a subject of much interest to foreign historians, concluding that he was a major persona in Polish, but not European, history.

== See also ==
- Army of the Polish–Lithuanian Commonwealth

== Bibliography ==
- Adamski, Krzysztof. "W poniedziałek, 30 listopada br., w Gryfinie, z udziałem Biskupa Kopenhagi, miały miejsce uroczyste obchody 350. rocznicy przemarszu wojsk Stefana Czarnieckiego, które 7 października 1659 r., pod Gryfinem, przeprawiły się przez Odrę, powracając z Danii. Zobacz galerię zdjęć – Uroczystości 350. rocznicy przeprawy Hetmana Stefana Czarnieckiego pod Gryfinem – Portal Archidiecezji Szczecińsko-Kamieńskiej". Diecezja.szczecin.pl.
- Brzezinski, Richard (25 July 2006). Polish Winged Hussar 1576–1775. Osprey Publishing. p. 24. ISBN 978-1-84176-650-8.
- Falba, Tomasz (2008). "Czy wiesz, jak morze trafiło do hymnu?". myśl. Archived from the original on 16 December 2017. (also published in Nasze Morze (Nr 7 (31) lipiec 2008 r.))
- Kersten, Adam (2006). Stefan Czarniecki 1599–1665. Wydawn. Uniwersytetu Marii Curie-Skłodowskiej. p. 27. ISBN 978-83-227-2545-0.
- Lerski, Jerzy Jan (1996). Historical Dictionary of Poland, 966–1945. Greenwood Publishing Group. p. 93. ISBN 978-0-313-26007-0.
- Nagielski, Mirosław (1995). "Stefan Czarniecki (1604–1655) hetman polny". Hetmani Rzeczypospolitej Obojga Narodów. Wydawn. Bellona. pp. 202, 204, 206–213. ISBN 978-83-11-08275-5.
- Pasek, Jan Chryzostom (1976). Memoirs of the Polish Baroque: The Writings of Jan Chryzostom Pasek, a Squire of the Commonwealth of Poland and Lithuania. University of California Press. p. 320. ISBN 978-0-520-02752-7.
- Podhorodecki, Leszek (1998). Stefan Czarniecki. Książka i Wiedza. pp. 6–231. ISBN 978-83-86170-36-4.
- Wandycz, Piotr Stefan (1980). The United States and Poland. Harvard University Press. p. 22. ISBN 978-0-674-92685-1.
- Chisholm, Hugh, ed. (1911). "Czarniecki, Stephen" . Encyclopædia Britannica. Vol. 7 (11th ed.). Cambridge University Press. p. 721.
