= Battle of Gołąb =

1656 battle

Coordinates: 51°29′13″N 21°52′31″E

- Part of the Northern War of 1655–1660 and The Deluge
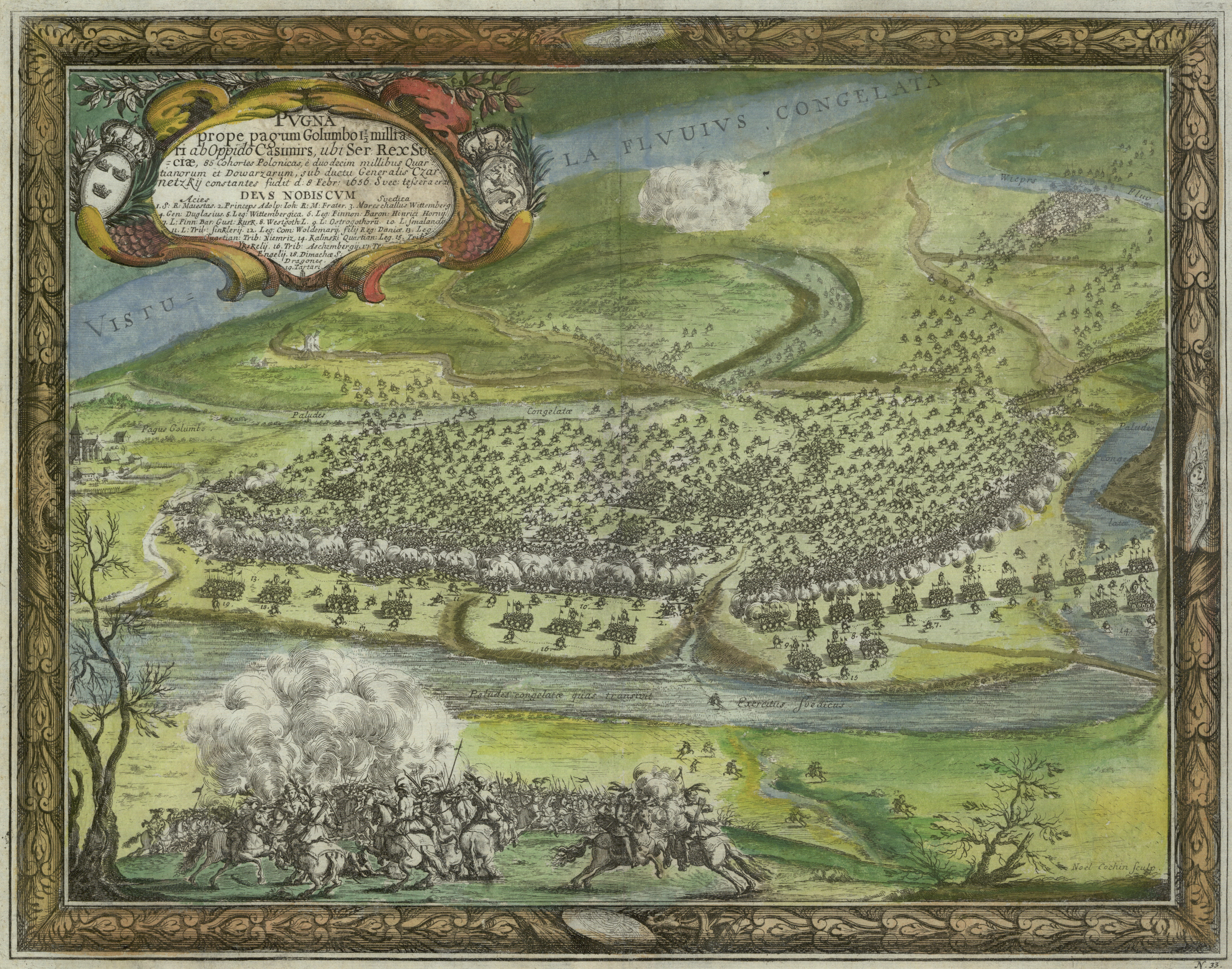
- Depiction of the Battle of Gołąb by Erik Dahlbergh
Date	18 or 19 February 1656
Location	Gołąb
Result	Swedish victory

Belligerents
(yes) Swedish Empire	Polish–Lithuanian Commonwealth

Commanders and leaders
(Swedish Empire) Charles X Gustav (Swedish Empire) Schleswig-Holstein	(Polish–Lithuanian Commonwealth) Stefan Czarniecki

Strength
7,500–8,000	1,800–1,900

Casualties and losses
100–200	147

The Battle of Gołąb was fought on either 18 or 19 February 1656, between forces of the Polish–Lithuanian Commonwealth commanded by Stefan Czarniecki on one side, and on the other Swedish Empire's army commanded by Charles X Gustav. This battle was essentially a meeting engagement with Swedish troops arriving on the battlefield at different times. It is uncertain how many actually participated, and its actual date is disputed. Some sources, such as Polish-language Military Encyclopedia, claim it took place on 18 February, while historian Leszek Podhorecki wrote that it was on 19 February.

== Background ==
In mid-February 1656, Swedish army under King Charles X Gustav camped near a village of Golab, located in northern Lesser Poland, near the confluence of the Wieprz and Vistula rivers. The Swedes awaited Polish units of Stefan Czarniecki. The Poles were divided into two groups; one commanded by Czarniecki himself, another headed by Colonel Sebastian Machowski. Swedish units had a number of Polish soldiers, who had deserted to their side. Among the Poles that served the Swedish King in this battle, was Jan Sobieski.

According to Polish historian Leszek Podhorecki, King Charles Gustav, after finding out about anti-Swedish insurrection in southern Lesser Poland, decided to move his army there. The Swedes crossed the Pilica river on 12 February, forcing Czarniecki to withdraw behind the Vistula, and camp near Golab.

== Battle ==
Swedish army crossed the frozen Vistula near Kazimierz Dolny, surprising a Polish regiment stationed there. The Swedes then moved along right bank of the river, reaching Golab, where they surprised the scattered Polish forces. Swedish front guard, under General Horn and Count Valdemar Christian of Schleswig-Holstein opened fire, moving forwards. This caused retreat of Polish forces, which was stopped by Czarniecki, who ordered a counter-attack.

At the same time, additional Swedish units entered the fray, gaining numerical superiority over the Poles. Swedish regiments, commanded personally by the King, backed for a while, but soon Polish attacked was halted under Swedish fire. To prevent his forces from complete destruction, Czarniecki ordered them to retreat. A number of Polish soldiers drowned while crossing the Wieprz, when the ice broke. Total Polish loses, however, were estimated at less than 150, mainly due to Czarniecki’s order to give up the battle and flee.

== Aftermath ==
The Poles, surrounded by an enemy that outnumbered them three times, did not allow themselves to be defeated and inflicted significant losses on the Swedish army. The skirmish near Gołębie proved the talent of Czarniecki, who skillfully exploited Charles Gustav's mistakes and successively attacked the divided Swedish forces.

Charles Gustav was confident that the battle ended in complete destruction of Czarniecki’s army. This was untrue, as the Poles used a manoeuver, which they had observed while fighting Crimean Tatars. Their forces scattered across the area, to concentrate again after a few days. The Battle of Golab was described by Henryk Sienkiewicz, in his novel Deluge.

== Swedish units ==
Swedish Regiments:

- Fältm. Wittenbergs Reiter (545)
- Henrik Horns Reiter (400)
- Gustav Kurcks Reiter (550)
- Västgöta Reiter (774)
- Östgöta Reiter (774)
- Smålands Reiter (738)
- Sinclers Reiter (440)
- Gr. Waldemars Reiter (550)
- Yxkulls Reiter (561)
- Aschebergs Reiter (400)
- Engells Reiter (323)

Total: 6,005 The individual unit strength figures are based on unit strength figures from five months or more previous to the battle.

Polish Troops in Swedish Service Kosack (Pancerni):

- Starosta of Slonim Jan Sapiehas Banner under Muchowiecki (118)
- Michal Zbrozeks Banner (100)
- Wojciech Golynskis Banner (72)
- Stonik of Czernichow Roman Zahorowskis Banner (70)
- Jerzy Wielhorskis Banner (93)
- Chorazy of Podolien Mikolaj Dzieduszyckis Banner (90)
- Seweryn Kalinskis Banner (150)
- Andrzej Kuklinowskis Banner (100)
- Jan Sapiehas Second Banner under Samuel Lojowski (113)

Total: 906

Tartars (Light Cavalry):

- Mustafa Sudicz Banner (109)
- Halembek Morawskis Banner (118)
- Jan Sieleckis Banner (120)
- Adam Taraszewskis Banner (120)
- Bohdan Murzas Banner (135)
- Mikolaj Pohajskis Banner under Stefan Morzkowski (100)
- Adam Talkowskis Banner (120)
- Jan Grzebultowskis Banner (51)

Total: 873

== Polish–Lithuanian Commonwealth units ==
The Army was divided in two regiments:

- Hetmans Regiment under Machowski
- Royal Regiment under Czarniecki

Hussars -

- Vojevoden of Sandomierz Wladyslaw Myszkowskis Banner (220)
- Jan Zamoyskis Banner (150)

Kosack (Pancerni) -

- Starosta of Halicz A.Potockis Banner (143)
- Karlo Potockis Banner (93)
- Stanislaw W. Domaszewskis Banner (106)
- Sebastian Machowskis Banner (112)
- Mikolaj Potockis Banner (150)*
- Samuel Rogowskis Banner (125)*
- Stanislaw Witowskis Banner (150)*
- Prince Konstanty Wisnowieckis Banner (150)
- Jan Mysliszewskis Banner (90)
- Starosta of Bohuslaw Jacek Szemberks Banner (150)
- Michal Stanislawskis Banner (92)
- Samuel Holubs Banner (70)
- Michal Morzkowskis Banner (78)
- Kanstanty Soszenskis Banner (99)*
- Alexander Cetners Banner (150)*
- Jan Karol Potockis Banner (115)
- Jacek Szemberks Valack Banner (99)
- Czarnieckis Dragoons (300) (newly recruited)

Total: 2,642

Units marked with * did not take part in the battle. They were escorting recruits.

== Works cited ==
- Mała Encyklopedia Wojskowa, 1967, Wydanie I
- Leszek Podhorodecki, Rapier i koncerz, Warszawa 1985, ISBN 83-05-11452-X, str. 288-291
- Skworoda Paweł, "Warka - Gniezno 1656", Bellona - Dom Wydawniczy Bellona 2004, ISBN 83-11-09765-8
- Wimmer Jan, "Wojna Polsko-Szwedzka 1655–1660", Warszawa, 1973.
- Wolke, Lars Ericson (2003). Svenska slagfält [Swedish battlefields] (in Swedish). Wahlström & Widstrand. ISBN 9789146202257.
- Starbäck, Carl Georg (1886). Berättelser ur svenska historien: Carl X Gustaf. Carl XI [Stories from Swedish history: Carl X Gustaf. Charles XI] (in Swedish). F. & G. Beijers Förlag.
- Sobczak, Antoni Krzysztof (2004). Materiały do historii wojskowości [Military history materials] (in Polish). Wyższa Szkoła Humanistyczna im. Aleksandra Gieysztora.
