= Piotr Starkowiecki =

Polish translator

- Coat of arms
- Born: Starkowiec
- Died: after 1644
- Father: Maciej Starkowiecki
- Mother: Jadwiga Bełdowska

Piotr Starkowiecki of the Łodzia coat of arms (died after 1644) was a translator of Ottoman Turkish, Persian, and Arabic.

== Biography ==
Piotr Starkowiecki hailed from a Greater Poland family bearing the Łodzia coat of arms. His surname also appears as Starkowski, Strakawiecki, and Starkoniecz. His birth date is unknown, but he may have been born in the village of Starkowiec in the Kalisz Voivodeship. He studied at the University of Bologna.

By 1640, Piotr Starkowiecki was in Constantinople, where he studied Eastern languages. Between 20 and 22 April 1640, he met in Constantinople and Küçükçekmece with the Polish envoy of King Władysław IV Vasa to Ibrahim of the Ottoman Empire, Wojciech Miaskowski. In his travel diary, Miaskowski lists Starkowiecki among the guests he invited to dinner. In the same year, Starkowiecki embarked on a pilgrimage to Jerusalem, which he commemorated with an entry in the pilgrims' book Navis peregrinorum.

His presence in Poland was recorded in February 1643. He was employed as a translator for the royal chancellery in Vilnius, receiving a quarterly salary of 200 thalers from the Włocławek royal treasury (documented from 24 March 1644). He translated letters addressed to Władysław IV Vasa from the Shah of Persia, the Ottoman Grand Vizier, and Sultan Ibrahim into Polish. According to Bohdan Baranowski, these translations demonstrate an exceptional knowledge of Ottoman Turkish, Persian, and Arabic, far surpassing that of other Polish translators of the era, such as Samuel Otwinowski, Krzysztof Serebkowicz, or Krzysztof Dzierżek. Jerzy Nosowski further highlights Starkowiecki's strong understanding of contemporary Middle Eastern politics.

== Translation of the Quran ==
Starkowiecki is said to have translated the Quran into Polish, though no trace of this translation survives. The only source for this claim is the armorial of Kasper Niesiecki:

The brother of Andrzej the voivode, Piotr, well-versed in Persian, Turkish, and Arabic languages, translated the Turkish Alkoran from Arabic into Polish, but death prevented its publication; he died young and unmarried.

His death at a young age prevented the publication. It is unclear whether he translated the entire holy book of Islam. It is also uncertain whether he translated directly from Arabic or used an Ottoman version. The purpose of the translation is unclear but may have reflected the currents of the Counter-Reformation. The translation could have aided Catholics in religious debates with the Tatars living in the Polish–Lithuanian Commonwealth. Religious polemics between Christianity and Islam had emerged by the late 16th century (e.g., Turcyki by Krzysztof Warszewicki) and intensified in the early 17th century (e.g., Alfurkan tatarski by Piotr Czyżewski). Fragments of the Quran translation might have been used by Catholic polemicists or deliberately destroyed by zealous Christians suspecting heresy.

== Family ==
Piotr's father was Maciej Starkowiecki (1585–1647), buried in the Kobylin church. His mother was likely Jadwiga née Bełdowska. Piotr had the following siblings:

- Anna (married Jacek Mieszkowski),
- Barbara (married Adam Franciszek Dobrzycki, then Piotr Walewski),
- Dorota (married Adam Suchorzewski, treasurer of Kalisz),
- Katarzyna (married Wiktor Stempowski, then Stanisław Wolski, then Jan Jastrzembowski),
- Andrzej Starkowiecki, royal secretary, envoy, Kamianets castellan, and poet.

He never married or started a family.
