= Stanisław Herbst =

Polish historian

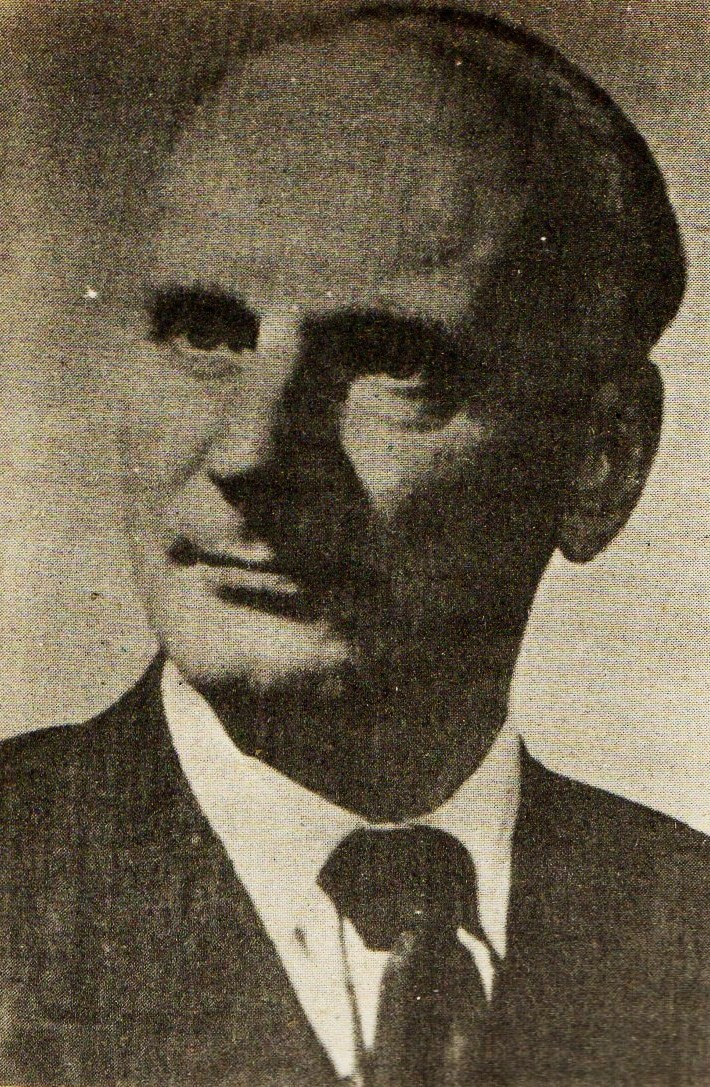
- Born: Stanisław Chrobot; 12 July 1907; Rakvere, Russian Empire (modern-day Estonia)
- Died: 24 June 1973 (aged 65); Warsaw, Poland
- Education: University of Warsaw
- Occupations: Historian, researcher of modern history, and military historian
- Years active: 1933–1973

Stanisław Herbst (né Chrobot; 12 July 1907, Rakvere, Russian Empire (now Estonia) – 24 June 1973, Warsaw) was a Polish historian, researcher of modern history, and military historian. He was a professor at the University of Warsaw and the Dzerzhinsky Political-Military Academy in Warsaw, and was also the president of the Polish Historical Society. Pupils of his included Zdzisław Spieralski and Tomasz Strzembosz.

== Biography ==
Herbst was born in Rakvere, Russian Empire (now Estonia), the son of Wacław Chrobot, a banker and artillery lieutenant, and Maria of Nowohoński (from landed nobility). He attended the Stefan Batory Gymnasium and Lyceum in Warsaw. After graduating in 1926, he undertook studies in history and art history at the University of Warsaw. His lecturers included Henryk Mościcki, Wacław Tokarz and Oskar Halecki, under whose supervision he defended his PhD in 1931 (based on the work War of Livonia, 1600–1602). From 1933 to 1934, he taught history at the gymnasium in Pruszków, and from 1935 to 1936, he completed studies at Warsaw University of Technology; from 1936 until the outbreak of World War II, he was senior assistant at the Department of Polish Architecture and Art History at Warsaw University of Technology. He also worked at the Ministry of Religious Denominations and Public Enlightenment, where he was an official in the Department of Religions (1935–1937) and a scientific adviser to ministers (1937–1939).

After the outbreak of World War II, he initially worked at the Archive of the Nieśwież Ordnance, then at the antique shop of Czesław Garliński, the National Library and the University Library in Warsaw; together with Piotr Biegański, Stanisław Lorentz and Jan Zachwatowicz, where he saved works of art during the Warsaw Uprising. He was an employee of the Jewish Department in the Information Department of the Information and Propaganda Office of the Home Army Headquarters, where he participated in helping Jewish people prepare materials revealing Nazi war crimes, as well as having maintained contacts with groupings in the Warsaw Ghetto, and helping hide people of Jewish nationality in homes in Warsaw. He also took part in secret teaching in the underground Free Polish University.

After the war, Herbst managed the Documentation Department at the State Institute of Art History in Warsaw from 1945 to 1946, then lectured on the history of culture at Warsaw University of Technology from 1946 to 1947. In 1946, he joined professionally with the University of Warsaw. After a habilitation in modern history (1946, work: Marszałkowska Street in Warsaw, 1754–1914), he became a lecturer at the Department of Modern Polish History from 1948 to 1956; for some time, Herbst also worked in the university library from 1946 to 1948 as a librarian and custodian. In 1954, he became an associate professor. In the following years, he worked at the Departments of Polish Feudal History from 1956 to 1959, Department of Polish History until the 18th century and Historical Sciences of Support by 1959 and was its head from 1962 to 1968. He also became the curator of the Department of Modern and Recent History from 1967 to 1968 and at the Historical Institute from 1968 to 1973; he became a full-time professor in 1961. He managed numerous extraordinary historical seminars at the university, and was an adviser of about 70 historical dissertations.

In addition to the University of Warsaw, Herbst was associated with the Institute of History at the Polish Academy of Sciences from 1953 to 1961 and was head of the Historical Atlas Unit, the Dzerzhinsky Political-Military Academy in Warsaw from 1957 to 1968 and was head of the Department of Military History and War Art, Mazovian Center for Scientific Research in Warsaw (chairman of the Scientific Council from 1967) and the Jewish Historical Institute in Poland (from 1969 chairman of the Scientific Council). In 1945, he was accepted as a member of the Warsaw Scientific Society (in 1945 as a member-correspondent, then in 1950 as an ordinary member); he was the secretary of the Commission of the Historical Atlas of the Polish Lands from 1948 to 1952 and also the secretary of the Commission of the History of Culture and Art from 1950 to 1952. He was an active member of the Polish Historical Society and from 1953 to 1955, he was the secretary, and from 1956 to his death was the president. He was a member of the editorial board of the Historical Review. In addition, he belonged to the Scientific Society in Białystok, the Scientific Society in Gdańsk, the Scientific Society of Płock, and the Scientific Society in Toruń. He took part in the International Historical Congresses in Vienna (1965) and Moscow (1970), sat on the Civic Committee for the Reconstruction of the Royal Castle in Warsaw (from 1971) and in the Capital City Council from 1958 to 1962. He collaborated with Christian and scout organizations.

== Awards and decorations ==
Among the prizes and distinctions that Herbst received include the 1st degree award of the Minister of National Defense (1968, for research on the Kościuszko Uprising), the Knight's Cross (1947) and Officer's Cross (1966) of the Order of Polonia Restituta, Order of the Banner of Labour 2nd class (1966), and title of Teacher of Merit of the Polish People's Republic (1969).

A street commemorating Herbst is located in the Ursynów district of Warsaw, between Al. National Education Commission and Capt. Witold Pilecki street (formerly Paweł Finder street).

== Research profile and legacy ==
Herbst's interests included the history of modern military, the history of cities, of Warsaw in particular, the history of modern culture, the methodology of history and historical geography. He was an expert on the history of Warsaw and Mazovia. He carried out research on the evolution of the Polish martial art of the 15th and 16th centuries and the shaping of the art of command in the early 17th century. He made a description of elements of the art of war, conducted by improvised troops, and examined the meaning of the masses in Polish wars. He devoted much of his research to the Kościuszko Uprising, including examining the causes of the insurrection and the combat trail, and showed the innovation of Kościuszko's command; he revised the memoirs of Jan Kiliński. He analyzed the guild's institution, the significance of Polish cities in the system of political power, and the history and significance of fortresses (including Zamość and Modlin). He investigated the history of the Jewish population of Warsaw, was interested in the history of Polish printing and the significance of Sarmatism in the Polish culture of the 17th century. He gathered rich sources and iconographic materials for the reign of Zygmunt III Waza. He cooperated with many magazines, including "Bulletin of the History of Art and Culture" (1937–1939), "Rocznik Warszawski" (1960–1972), "Kwartalnik Historyczne", "Przegląd Historyczny", "Military Historical Review", "Studies and Materials for the History of Militarism". He was a member of the Editorial Committee of the Polish Biographical Dictionary.

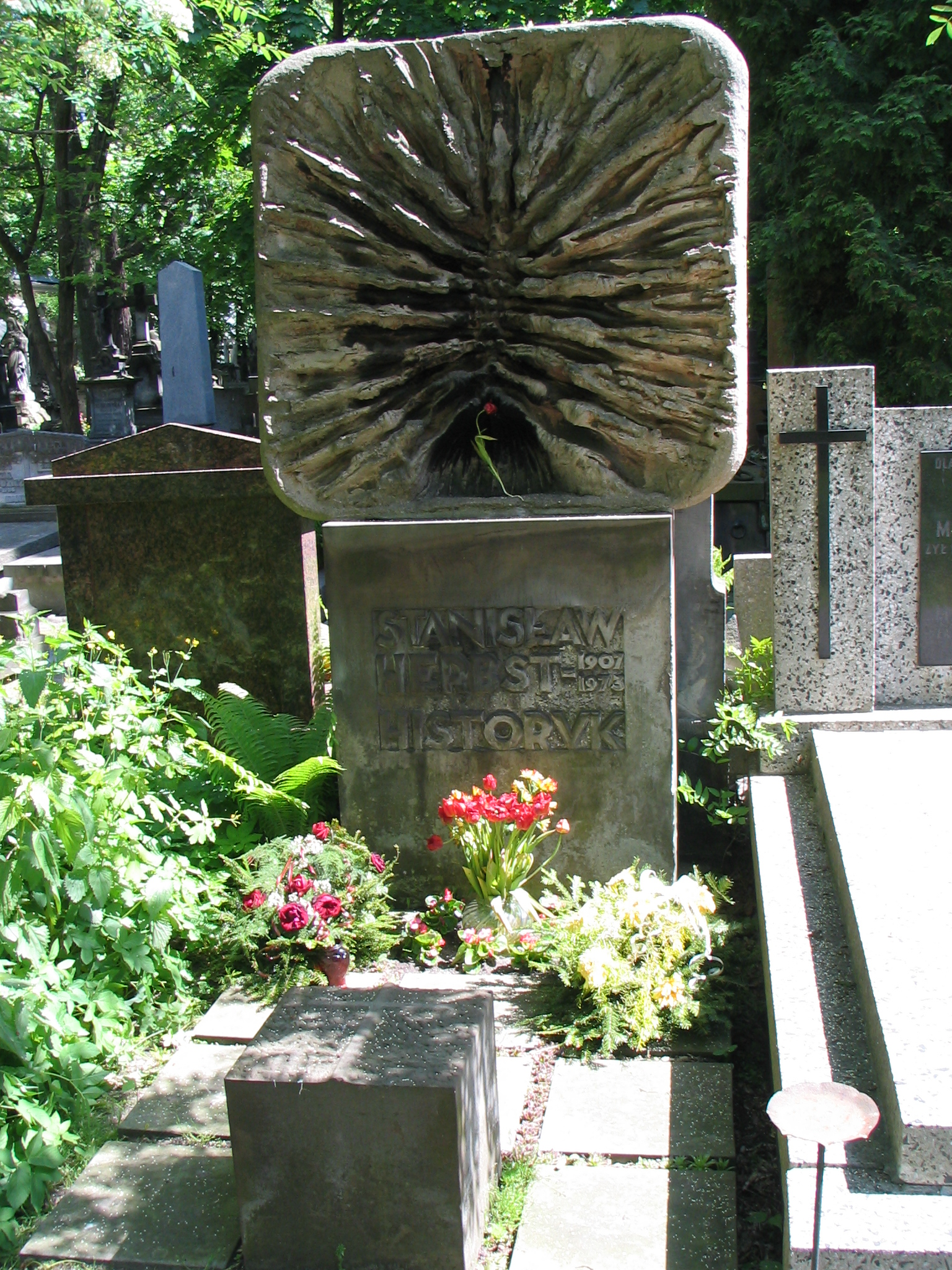
Tombstone of Stanisław Herbst at Powązki Cemetery

== Bibliography (selection) ==
Herbst had published over 550 works by the time of his death, including:

- Entre le Boug et la Vistule: 19 mai-15 juin 1794 (1933)
- Toruńskie cechy rzemieślnicze (1933)
- Kleck 1506 (1934)
- Między Bugiem a Wisłą 1794 (1935)
- Wojna moskiewska 1507-08 (1935)
- Przegląd literatury dotyczącej Warszawy (1936)
- Twierdza Zamość. Część historyczna (1936, with Jan Zachwatowicz)
- Czasy Zygmunta III (1937)
- Pierwsza Konferencja Historyków Bałtyckich w Rydze 15-20 sierpnia 1937 r. (1937)
- Wojna inflancka 1600-1602 (1938)
- Zarys nauk pomocniczych historii (1948, with Aleksandr Gieysztor)
- Miasta i mieszczaństwo Renesansu polskiego (1954)
- Zamość (1955)
- Odrodzenie w Polsce (1956)
- Polska kultura mieszczańska na przełomie XVI i XVII wieku (1956)
- Regionalne badania historyczne w przeszłości i w Polsce Ludowej (1956)
- Studia renesansowe (1956)
- Historia wojskowa: treść, dzieje, metoda i metodologia (1961)
- Kultura polska w źródłach i opracowaniach (1961, with Juliusz Bardach)
- Polskie Tysiąclecie (1961, with Aleksandr Gieysztor and Bogusław Leśnodorski)
- L’historiographie militaire polonaise (1969)
- Umysłowość i ideologia polska w XVII wieku (1969)
