= Krystyna Kersten =

Polish historian and professor

- Born: Krystyna Goławska; May 25, 1931; Poznań, Poznań Voivodeship, Second Polish Republic
- Died: July 10, 2008 (aged 77); Warsaw, Masovian Voivodeship, Third Polish Republic
- Resting place: Northern Communal Cemetery
- Other name: Jan Bujnowski
- Occupation: Historian
- Political party: PZPR
- Other political affiliations: Solidarity
- Spouse: Adam Kersten

Academic background
- Education: University of Warsaw
- Thesis: Repatriacje ludności polskiej po II wojnie światowej. Studium historyczne (1971)

Academic work
- Discipline: History
- Institutions: University of Warsaw
- Doctoral students: Paweł Kowal; Dariusz Libionka; Jan Żaryn

Krystyna Kersten (pen name, Jan Bujnowski; born Krystyna Goławska May 25, 1931 in Poznań – July 10, 2008 in Warsaw) was a Polish historian, a professor at the Historical Institute of the Polish Academy of Sciences, and a fellow of Collegium Invisibile. Described as "the first lady of Polish historiography", her essays on topics including Communism, Jews in Poland, and post-war Poland, have been collected in a number of volumes.

Kersten was born in 1931 to a family of Polish intelligentsia. Her father, Edmund Goławski, was the regional public prosecutor at the district court in Gniezno. He was taken prisoner by the Soviets in 1939 and murdered in Katyn in the spring of 1944, sparking his daughter's resistance to cooperation with the ruling authorities.

She graduated from the faculty of history of the University of Warsaw and taught there for several decades. Although her master's thesis, entitled Rynek lokalny Wielunia w XVI w. (transl. The Local Market of Wieluń in the 16th Century), focused on medieval Polish, she was hired by Tadeusz Manteuffel in 1954 to teach the history of contemporary Poland.

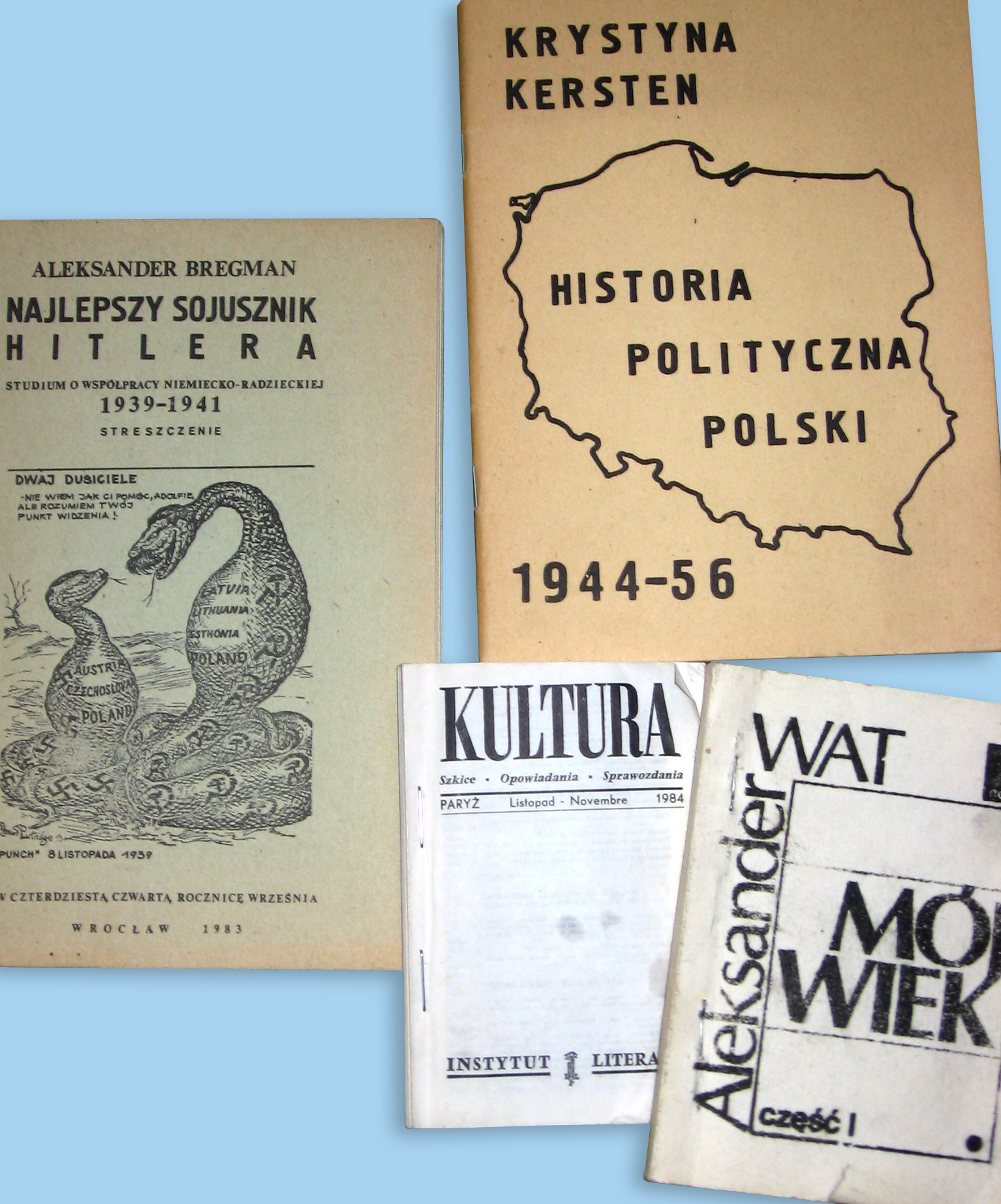
Polish samizdat books & brochures printed during the 1980s, including Kersten's Historia Polityczna Polski 1944-1956

Kersten was a member of the Union of Polish Youth between 1948 and 1956. She joined the Communist Party (PZPR) in 1956 with hopes of pluralism and greater political openness in the post-Stalin era. Protesting the Warsaw Pact invasion of Czechoslovakia, she left the party in 1968 and became active in the democratic opposition movement in the 1970s and 1980s, including the Solidarity Movement. In 1975, Kersten was one of 7 intellectuals who signed an open letter to Edward Gierek, secretary of the PZPR, faulting him for breaking promises made after the workers' strikes in December 1970. Prior to her break with the party, Kersten's work hewed much more closely to the official Party narrative, i.e. in her monograph on the Polish Committee of National Liberation. She grew frustrated with censorship and considered studying seventeenth century history, subject to much less censorship. Nevertheless, in the late 1970s, she began to take advantage of the opportunities of publishing with the underground dissidence movement.

She published the first detailed Polish analysis of the 1946 anti-Jewish Kielce pogrom in December 1981, shortly before the introduction of martial law in Poland. In autumn 1981, her brochure on the history of post-war Poland, Historia polityczna Polski 1944-1956, was due to be published in the legal weekly magazine Tygodnik Solidarność but was censored by martial law; it was published clandestinely by Krag, an underground publisher, under Kersten's own name, and was reprinted at least ten times. Her book, Narodziny systemu wladzy Polska 1943-1948 (transl. The Birth of the System of Power in Poland, 1943–1948), was written in response to a proposal from the Polish émigré publishing house Libella and published by Krag in 1985. It was published by Libella internationally in 1986 and won the Solidarity Cultural Prize; an underground best-seller, it was reprinted again in 1987 and 1988.

Her main field of study was the history of Poland after 1944, and especially the first period of communist rule following World War II. She published numerous works, some of them via the Polish underground press. She married Adam Kersten, also a noted historian. In 1999 she became seriously ill and largely stepped out of public life. She died on 10 July 2008 and was buried in the Northern Cemetery in Warsaw with her husband.

== Works ==
- Kersten, Krystyna (1989). Jałta w polskiej perspektywie (in Polish). London: Aneks. ISBN 9780906601587. OCLC 28721377.
- Kersten, Krystyna (1991). The Establishment of Communist Rule in Poland, 1943-1948. Translated by Bernhard, Michael; Micgiel, John. University of California Press. ISBN 9780520062191.
- Kersten, Krystyna (1992). Polacy, Żydzi, komunizm : anatomia półprawd, 1939-68 (in Polish). Warsaw: Niezależna Oficyna Wydawnicza. ISBN 9788370540265. OCLC 29278144.
