= Czarniecki family =

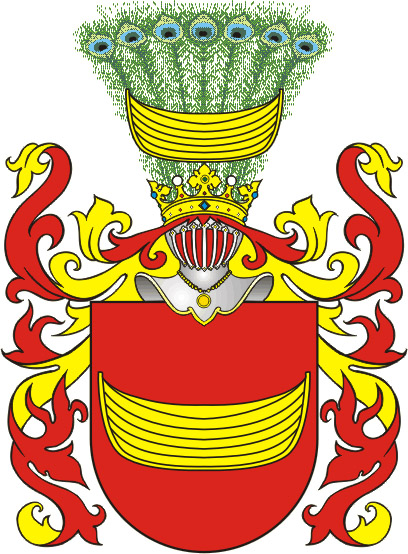
Łodzia coat of arms of the Czarniecki family

Czarniecki (feminine form: Czarniecka, plural: Czarnieccy) was a Polish noble family.

== History ==
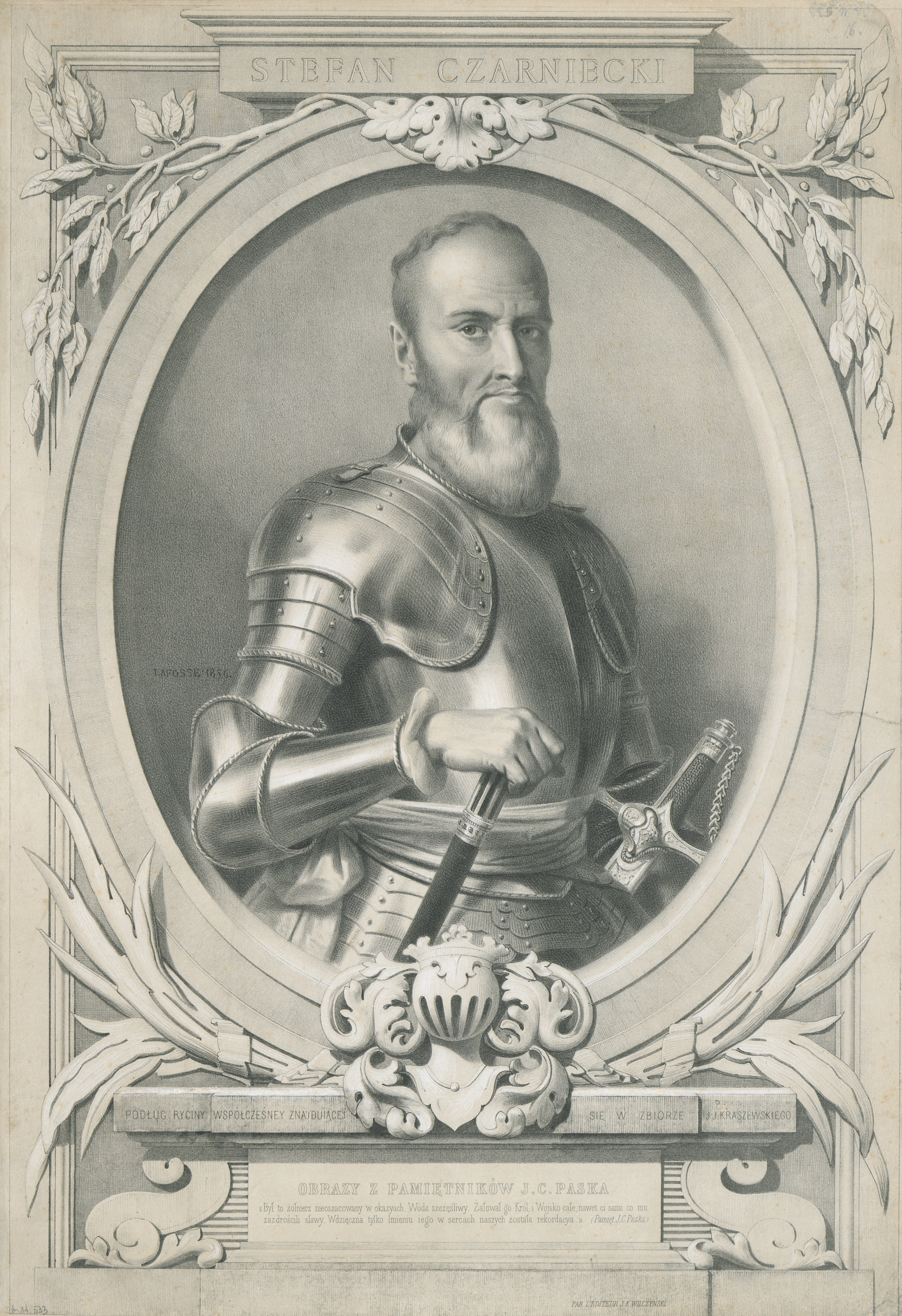
Hetman Stefan Czarniecki

The Czarniecki family was most prominent in the 17th century and can be traced back to the 14th century. The Łodzia coat of arms was given to the family by King Władysław II Jagiełło. The family name originates from the town of Czarnca in the Świętokrzyskie Voivodeship, Włoszczowa County.

== Notable members ==
Among most known members are:

- Krzysztof Czarniecki z Czarncy (1564–1636), courtier, starost of Chęciny and Żywiec, married Krystyna Rzeszowska h. Wąż z jabłkiem and Jadwiga Brzostowska z Żeronic h. Strzemię
  - Stefan Czarniecki z Czarncy (1599–1665), Field Hetman of the Crown, voivode of Kiev and Ruthenia, married Zofia Kobierzycka z Kobierzycka Wielkiego i Małego h. Pomian
  - Paweł Czarniecki z Czarncy (died 1664), rotmistrz and Royal pułkownik
- Jan Aleksander Czarniecki z Czarncy, miecznik of Kraków
- Jan Czarniecki z Czarncy, Bishop of Kamieniec Podolski and prior of Czerwinsk

== Coat of arms and motto ==
The Czarniecki family used the Łodzia coat of arms.

== See also ==
- National Anthem of Poland

== Bibliography ==
- Podhorodecki L., Sławni hetmani Rzeczypospolitej, Warszawa 1994, s. 409.
- Czarnieccy z Czarncy w służbie królów i Rzeczypospolitej. Author, Teofila Sokolińska. Publisher, Oficyna Wydawnicza "Ston 2", 2003. ISBN, 8372730822
