= Siege of Kolding (1658) =

1658 battle

- Part of Second Northern War
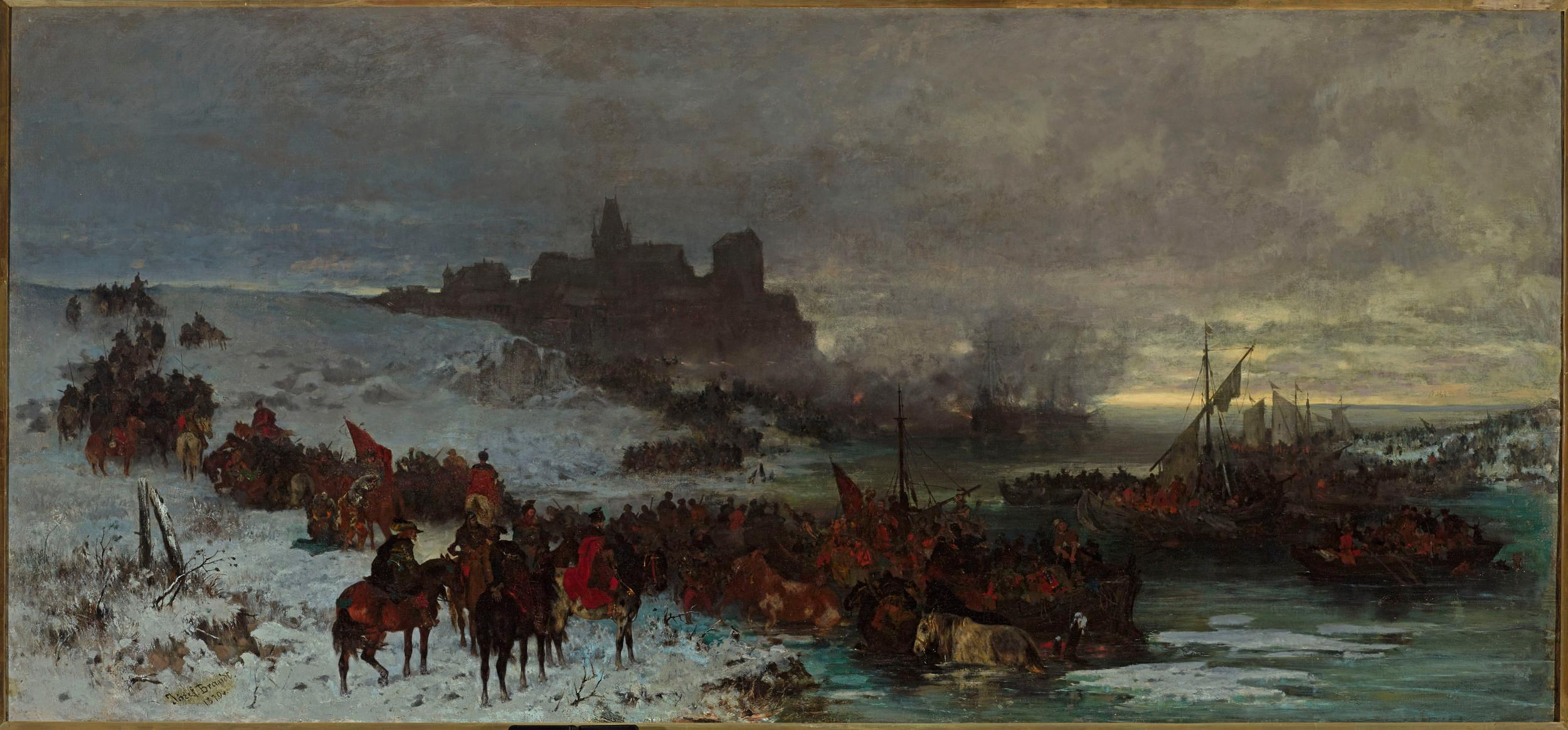
- Assault on Kolding
| Date | 23-25 December 1658 |
| Location | Kolding, Denmark |
| Result | Dano-Polish victory |

Belligerents
| Polish–Lithuanian Commonwealth; Denmark–Norway | (yes) Swedish Empire |

Commanders and leaders
| (Polish–Lithuanian Commonwealth) Stefan Czarniecki | Unknown |

Strength
| Unknown | 100 |

Casualties and losses
| Unknown | 80 killed 20 captured |

The siege of Kolding was fought on December 25, 1658, between Sweden and the forces of the Polish–Lithuanian Commonwealth and Denmark–Norway. The Polish and Danish forces were led by Stefan Czarniecki. The Polish-Danish force won the battle.

After capturing the island of Als, Stefan Czarniecki's division was transported back to the Jutland Peninsula, where, together with Imperial troops, they began the assault on Kolding, the former residence of Danish kings, which was defended by a Swedish company of not much more than 100 men. Regimentarz Czarniecki attacked the fortress before dawn on December 23. The advancing soldiers took advantage of the dense fog, approaching the walls unnoticed. To protect themselves from enemy fire, they all carried bundles of straw. When the soldiers began climbing the fortifications, they were spotted by a sentry, who raised the alarm. The Swedes immediately rushed to fight and repelled the assault.

The defenders of the fortress also repelled a second attack, and when Czarniecki proposed that they surrender, they firmly refused. The third assault, carried out on December 25, proved successful, and the Poles managed to breach the castle. Fighting broke out in the chambers and the castle courtyard. When one of the dragoon reached the powder magazine and ignited the ammunition, a massive explosion occurred, destroying part of the castle- eliminating the Swedish soldiers defending that section as well. Soon, the resistance ceased, and Kolding was captured.

The Swedes tried to retake the city, but Czarniecki's forces repelled their landing on the Jutland Peninsula.

After the capture of Kolding, the Polish forces set up winter quarters.
