= Chernetsky =

Chernetsky (Russian: Чернецкий, Ukrainian: Чернецький), feminine form Chernetskaya (Russian: Чернецкая) or Chernetska (Ukrainian: Чернецька) is an East Slavic surname. Notable bearers include:

- Arkady Chernetsky (born 1950), Russian politician
- Juliya Chernetsky (born 1982), American television personality
- Nikolay Chernetskiy (born 1959), Soviet sprinter
- Oleksandr Chernetskyi (born 1984), Ukrainian Greco-Roman wrestler
- Ruslan Chernetsky (born 1981), Belarusian actor and politician
- Semyon Chernetsky (1881–1950), Soviet military music conductor
- Sergey Chernetskiy (born 1990), Russian cyclist

== See also ==
- Czarnecki
