= Battle of Kcynia =

1656 battle

- Part of the Second Northern War / The Deluge
Date	1 June 1656
Location	Kcynia, Poland
Result	Swedish victory

Belligerents
Swedish Empire	Polish–Lithuanian Commonwealth

Commanders and leaders
(Swedish Empire) Charles X Gustav (Swedish Empire) Palatine-Kleeburg	(Polish–Lithuanian Commonwealth) Stefan Czarniecki (Polish–Lithuanian Commonwealth) Jakub Wejher

Strength
Unknown	Unknown

Casualties and losses
Light	At least 300 killed

The Battle of Kcynia took place on June 1, 1656, and was one of the battles of the Swedish invasion of Poland. It resulted in a victory for Swedish forces, commanded by King Charles X Gustav and Adolph John I, Count Palatine of Kleeburg.

In the spring of 1656, Hetman Stefan Czarniecki carried out a raid in Swedish-occupied Greater Poland, during he supported Polish guerrilla forces. On May 20, he left Uniejów, and headed northwards, to Royal Prussia, where his division joined the local pospolite ruszenie, commanded by the Voivode of Malbork Voivodeship, Jakub Weyher. Polish forces camped near Kcynia, feeling safe among the waters of the Noteć river. Meanwhile, Count Adolph John entered Bydgoszcz on May 26.

Czarniecki's raid into Royal Prussia alarmed King Charles X Gustav, who at that time commanded the Siege of Danzig. Charles Gustav decided to act quickly, and in late May, he abandoned the siege, and together with his army marched southwards, reaching Bydgoszcz on May 31, to meet Adolph John.

On June 1, after crossing the Noteć near Rynarzewo, the Swedes attacked Czarniecki's camp, completely surprising the Poles, whose units were scattered in the area. After an initial skirmish, the Poles began to flee, while Swedish soldiers advanced into the camp. The Swedish victory was complete, the camp was destroyed, and several Polish officers were captured, including the royal envoy, Jan Dominik Dzialynski.

After the defeat, Czarniecki cancelled his Prussian plans, and following royal orders, marched to Warsaw.

== Sources ==
- Miroslaw Nagielski, Warszawa 1656, Wydawnictwo Bellona, Warszawa 1990, ISBN 83-11-07786-X
- Leszek Podhorodecki, Rapier i koncerz, Warszawa 1985, ISBN 83-05-11452-X
