= Battle of Kłecko =

1656 battle

- Part of the Second Northern War / The Deluge
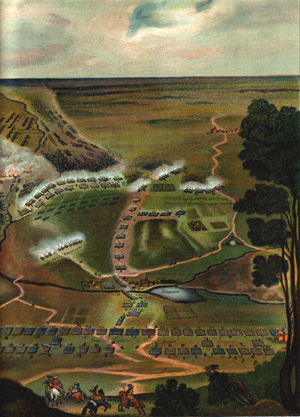
- Battle of Kłecko by Johann Philip Lemke
| Date | May 7, 1656 |
| Location | near Gniezno, Poland |
| Result | Swedish victory |

Belligerents
| Swedish Empire | Polish–Lithuanian Commonwealth |

Commanders and leaders
| (Swedish Empire) Carl Gustaf Wrangel (Swedish Empire) Adolf Johan av Pfalz-Zweibrücken | (Polish–Lithuanian Commonwealth) Stefan Czarniecki |

Strength
| 7,000 | 12,000 |

Casualties and losses
| Carl Gustaf Wrangel: 100 killed and wounded 428 killed | Stefan Czarniecki: 70 dead and wounded 130 killed John Thurloe: 600 killed on spot, 1,400 in pursuit von Pufendorf: 600 killed on spot, 2,500 in pursuit |

The Battle of Kłecko was fought on May 7, 1656, between forces of the Polish–Lithuanian Commonwealth commanded by Regimentarz Stefan Czarniecki and Jerzy Sebastian Lubomirski and a Swedish force commanded by prince Adolf Johan av Pfalz-Zweibrücken. The Polish–Lithuanian force was more than 12,000 strong and consisted mostly of cavalry, while the Swedes numbered around 7,000 artillery, infantry and cavalry. The Swedes achieved a tactical victory in that they escaped destruction by the Poles, who were unable to get to the Swedish army entrenched behind the Welnianka River, and various ditches and swamps. Swedish army lost 428 dead, while the Polish army sustained 70 dead and wounded, 2,000 dead or 3,000 dead (depending on sources), including 40 companions dead (both hetman Czarniecki and Polish hussar companion Kochowski (who was fighting in this battle) quote this number of Polish losses).

== Background ==
In the spring of 1656, Hetmans Stefan Czarniecki and Jerzy Sebastian Lubomirski were sent with their forces to Greater Poland, in order to support anti-Swedish insurrection, which had begun there. King Charles X Gustav, who had just managed to escape encirclement in the confluence of the Vistula and the San river, decided to head to Greater Poland, with 10,000 soldiers.

Charles Gustav left Warsaw on April 17, 1656, reaching Pakość on April 28. There, he split his forces into two groups. The King himself left with 2,000 soldiers towards the besieged Gdańsk, while the remaining 8,000 under Gustav' brother, Adolph John I, Count Palatine of Kleeburg, continued to chase the Poles.

Polish army, which camped along northern bank of the Noteć river, concentrated on May 3 in Pila. On the next day, the Poles crossed the Noteć near Ujście, and marched towards Oborniki Wielkopolskie. After bypassing Poznań, the Poles reached Gniezno (May 5), while on the next day, Adolph John with his army arrived at the village of Jablkowo near Kłecko, 15 kilometers northeast of Gniezno. When news of Charles Gustav's departure to Royal Prussia reached Polish commandants, they decided to face the Swedes in an open field.

== Battle ==
The Polish army had 12,000 soldiers, mostly cavalry, while the Swedes had 7,000 men with strong artillery units. According to the battle plan of Czarniecki, two Polish cavalry regiments (under Mariusz Stanislaw Jaskolski and Jacek Szemberk) were to engage the Swedes on a dike across a swampy stream called Welnianka, near the village of Brzozogaj. The dike was a trap, behind which four experienced Polish regiments awaited the enemy.

The plan initially was a success, and after an exchange of fire, the Poles organized a retreat towards the dike. Swedish soldiers began to chase them, but the trap failed, when the four awaiting regiments entered the fray too soon. The Swedes retreated to their well-prepared positions, preventing the destruction of their army. Due to strong Swedish fire, the Poles did not attack their camp, and the battle ended after five hours. According to the Swedish description of the battle, the Polish forces were chased out and pursued. The Polish losses in the battle are highly disputed: Stefan Czarniecki, the Polish commander, claimed he had sustained about 70 dead and wounded. John Thurloe, secretary to the council of state in England, wrote about 600 killed in the battle itself, with another 1,400 more killed during the pursuit. German historian Samuel von Pufendorf made a similar estimation of 600 killed on the field, but with as many as 2,500 killed during the pursuit. 21 Polish standards were also lost. The Swedish losses in the battle were 100 killed and wounded, according to their commander Carl Gustaf Wrangel, or, according to other sources, about 428 killed and perhaps twice as many, or more, wounded.

== Aftermath ==
The battle once again confirmed the notion that Polish cavalry was unable to defeat well-positioned Swedish infantry. Czarniecki himself later admitted, that without infantry and artillery, it was impossible to win battles with Swedish forces.

After the battle, the Polish army marched towards Pleszew and Uniejów, where it camped on May 16. The situation of the Swedes deteriorated, and by the end of May, the Poles recaptured Leszno, Kościan and Sieradz.
