= Krzysztof Czarniecki =

Polish nobleman (c. 1564–1636)

Krzysztof Czarniecki of the Łodzia coat of arms (c. 1564 – 1636) was a Polish nobleman and starosta of Żywiec.

He was son of Jan Czarniecki. Krzysztof had two brothers: Marcin and Olbracht. Krzysztof was born around 1564.

As a soldier he fought under Jan Zamoyski in the battle of Byczyna and in Livonia.

He was married twice: firstly to Krystyna Rzeszowska, and secondly to N. Brzostowska. From his first marriage, he had ten children: Piotr, Wojciech, Stanisław, Paweł, Tomasz, Stefan, Dobrogost, Franciszek, Marcin and Katarzyna.

== Bibliography ==
- Niesiecki, Kasper (1839). Herbarz polski. Vol. 3. Lipsk: Bretikopf & Hertel. p. 188.
- Podhorodecki, Leszek (1994). Sławni hetmani Rzeczypospolitej. Warszawa: Wydawnictwo MADA. pp. 409–410. ISBN 83-86170-06-9.
