= Bolewski =

Bolewski coat of arms used by some of Bolewski family

Bolewski (feminine: Bolewska) is a Polish surname. Some of them use: Bolewski or Łodzia coat of arms. Notable people with the surname include:

- Alex Bolewski (1891–1981), Australian rugby league player
- Andrzej Bolewski (1906–2002), Polish mineralogist and petrographer
- Jacek Bolewski SJ (1946–2012), Polish Roman Catholic Jesuit, professor of theology, writer
- Henry Bolewski (1890–1976), Australian rugby league player and coach
- Lanny Boleski (born 1941), Canadian football player
- Mick Bolewski (1888–1974), Australian rugby league player
- Wilfried Bolewski (born 1943), German diplomat, ambassador to Jamaica
