= Czarnca =

- Village
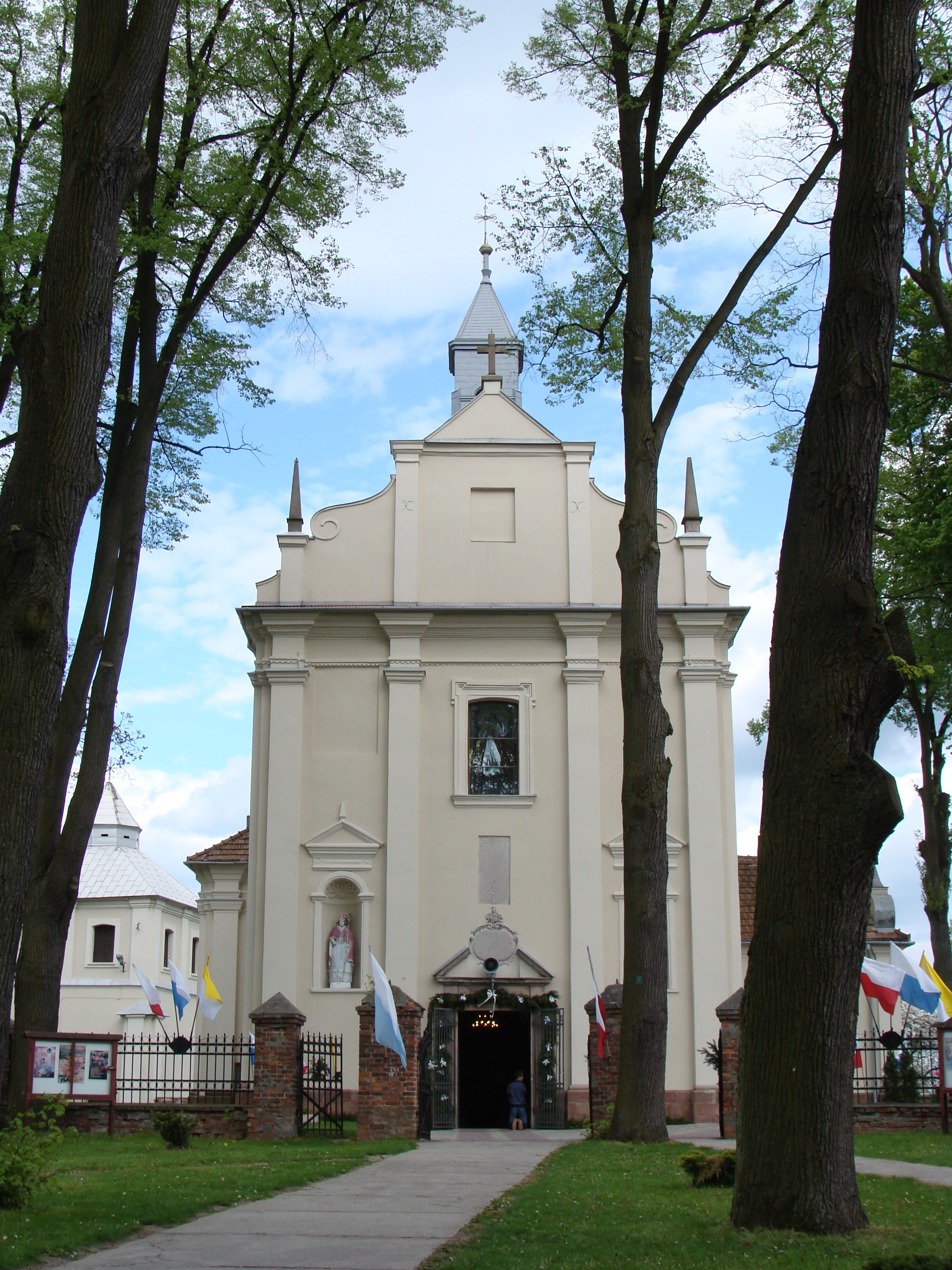
- Saint Florian church

- Location within Poland
- Coordinates: 50°48′N 19°55′E
- Country: Poland
- Voivodeship: Świętokrzyskie
- County: Włoszczowa
- Gmina: Włoszczowa
- Population: 730

Czarnca [ˈt͡ʂarnt͡sa] is a village in the administrative district of Gmina Włoszczowa, within Włoszczowa County, Świętokrzyskie Voivodeship, in south-central Poland. It lies approximately 7 km (4 mi) south-west of Włoszczowa and 51 km (32 mi) west of the regional capital Kielce.

Historically, the village is connected to the Czarniecki family of the Łodzia coat of arms dating back to 1184. At present, a 17th-century church is located in the village. It is the site of burial of famous Polish military commander, 17th-century hetman Stefan Czarniecki, who was born in the village and funded the construction of the church.
