= Czarnocin =

Czarnocin may refer to the following places:

- Czarnocin, Łódź Voivodeship (central Poland)
- Czarnocin, Podlaskie Voivodeship (north-east Poland)
- Czarnocin, Świętokrzyskie Voivodeship (south-central Poland)
- Czarnocin, Białobrzegi County in Masovian Voivodeship (east-central Poland)
- Czarnocin, Mińsk County in Masovian Voivodeship (east-central Poland)
- Czarnocin, Mława County in Masovian Voivodeship (north-central Poland)
- Czarnocin, Opole Voivodeship (south Poland)
- Czarnocin, Pomeranian Voivodeship (north Poland)
- Czarnocin, West Pomeranian Voivodeship (north-west Poland)
