= Karen Czarnecki =

American government official

Karen M. Czarnecki
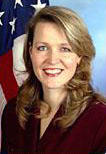
- DOL Portrait
- Born: Philadelphia, Pennsylvania, USA
- Education: BA, Catholic University; Juris Doctor, Columbus School of Law
- Occupations: Academic; Government Official
- Employer: Charlotte Lozier Institute
- Political party: Republican

Karen M. Czarnecki is an American public policy professional. Currently, she is the Executive Director of the Charlotte Lozier Institute. and an adjunct professor at George Mason University. She is a former member of the Federal Service Impasses Panel. She is also a former Congressional chief of staff and held various appointed executive positions at the Department of Labor in the administration of President George W. Bush.

== Career ==
Following a White House internship in the administration of Ronald Reagan, Karen Czarnecki served as a Special Assistant for Domestic Policy and Public Liaison to Vice President Dan Quayle. In the 1990s she held positions at the American Legislative Exchange Council and the Heritage Foundation.

During the administration of President George W. Bush, Czarencki held a number of appointed leadership positions at the U.S. Department of Labor. Beginning in June 2001, she served as Deputy Assistant Secretary for Intergovernmental Affairs, responsible for outreach to state and local officials. In June 2003 she was appointed Director of the Office of the 21st Century Workforce, which hosted conferences and workshops and published various materials to highlight the strategic workforce initiatives of Secretary of Labor Elaine Chao. She also served as Acting Assistant Secretary in the Office of Disability Employment Policy.

During the 112th Congress, she was chief of staff to Rep. Mike Kelly (R-PA).

In 2017 Czarnecki was appointed a member of the Federal Service Impasses Panel of the Federal Labor Relations Authority for a term to expire in 2020.

Czarnecki is the Executive Director of the Charlotte Lozier Institute. She is the former Vice President for Outreach for George Mason University’s Mercatus Center and is an adjunct professor at the University. She was previously an adjunct professor at Georgetown University. She is also a chair and member of the Board of Regents for the Fund for American Studies.

On December 23, 2019, President Trump announced his intent to nominate her to be a member of the Federal Services Impasses Panel.

== Media Appearances ==
Czarnecki has appeared on Fox News Channel, MSNBC, CNN, Canadian Public Broadcasting, and C-SPAN. For more than a decade she appeared regularly on To the Contrary on PBS. She was criticized by Washington Post columnist Al Kamen for appearing in a personal capacity on To the Contrary during her tenure at the Department of Labor; however, the appearances were approved by the agency's ethics office.

== Publications ==
- "Will These Women Clean House?" Policy Review. The Hoover Institution. Spring 1995. Retrieved 2017-08-18.
- "Ranking the States by Fiscal Condition 2017." Webinar. The Mercatus Center. July 13, 2017. Retrieved 2019-04-2019.
