= Joanna Czarnecka =

Polish basketball player

Personal information
- Born: May 4, 1982 (age 44) Wrocław, Poland
- Listed height: 1.92 m (6 ft 4 in)
- Position: Center

Career history
- 2000-2001: SMS PZKosz Łomianki
- 2001-2005: TS Wisła Can-Pack Kraków
- 2005-2008: AZS PWSZ Gorzów Wielkopolski
- 2008-2011: Tęcza Leszno
- 2011-2013: TS Wisła Can-Pack Kraków
- 2013-present: WTK Ślęza Wrocław

Joanna Czarnecka (born May 4, 1982) is a Polish female professional basketball player.
