= Czarnia =

Czarnia may refer to:

- Czarnia (comics), a fictional home-planet of DC Comics character Lobo
- Czarnia, Gmina Czarnia in Masovian Voivodeship (east-central Poland)
- Czarnia, Gmina Kadzidło in Masovian Voivodeship (east-central Poland)
