= Adam Kersten =

Polish historian (1930–1983)

- Born: April 26, 1930; Kutno, Poland
- Died: January 11, 1983 (aged 52); Warsaw, Poland
- Education: University of Warsaw
- Occupations: Historian, professor
- Spouse: Krystyna Kersten
- Writing career
- Subject: 17th-century Polish history
- Notable awards: Order of Polonia Restituta (Posthumous)
- Movement: Solidarity

Adam Kersten (26 April 1930 in Kutno - 11 January 1983 in Warsaw) was a Polish historian, expert on Polish history in the 17th century. He was a member of the faculty at Maria Curie-Skłodowska University from 1955.

From 1980 Kersten was active in the Solidarity movement.

Kersten was the husband of fellow historian Krystyna Kersten.

Posthumously, Kersten received the Order of Polonia Restituta.

== Works ==
- Opowieści o szwedzkim najeździe (1956)
- Chłopi polscy w walce z najazdem szwedzkim 1655 - 1656 (1958)
- Z badań nad konfederacją tyszowiecką (1958)
- Geneza nowej gigantomachii (1958)
- Pierwszy opis obrony Jasnej Góry w 1655 r. (1959)
- Stefan Czarniecki 1599-1665 (1963)
- Obrona Klasztoru w Jasnej Górze (1964)
- Sienkiewicz – „Potop” – Historia (1966)
- Historia dla klasy II liceum ogólnokształcacego (1968)
- Na tropach Napierskiego. W kręgu mitów i faktów (1970)
- Warszawa Kazimierowska 1648-1668: miasto, ludzie, polityka (1971)
- Historia Szwecji (1973)
- Szwedzi pod Jasną Górą 1655 (1975)
- Historia powszechna, 1648-1789 (1978)
- Historia powszechna, wiek XVII (1984)
- Hieronim Radziejowski: studium władzy i opozycji (1988)
