= Andrzej Opaliński (1575–1623) =

Polish–Lithuanian nobleman and priest (1575–1623)

Andrzej Opaliński (1575–1623), of Łodzia coat of arms, was a Polish–Lithuanian nobleman and Catholic priest. He was Bishop of Poznań from 1607 till his death in 1623.

He was the son of the Great and Court Crown Marshal, Andrzej Opaliński, and a supporter of King Sigismund III Vasa.

Preceded by Wawrzyniec Grzymała Goślicki	Bishop of Poznań; 1607–1623	Succeeded by Jan Wężyk
