= Andrzej Opaliński (1540–1593) =

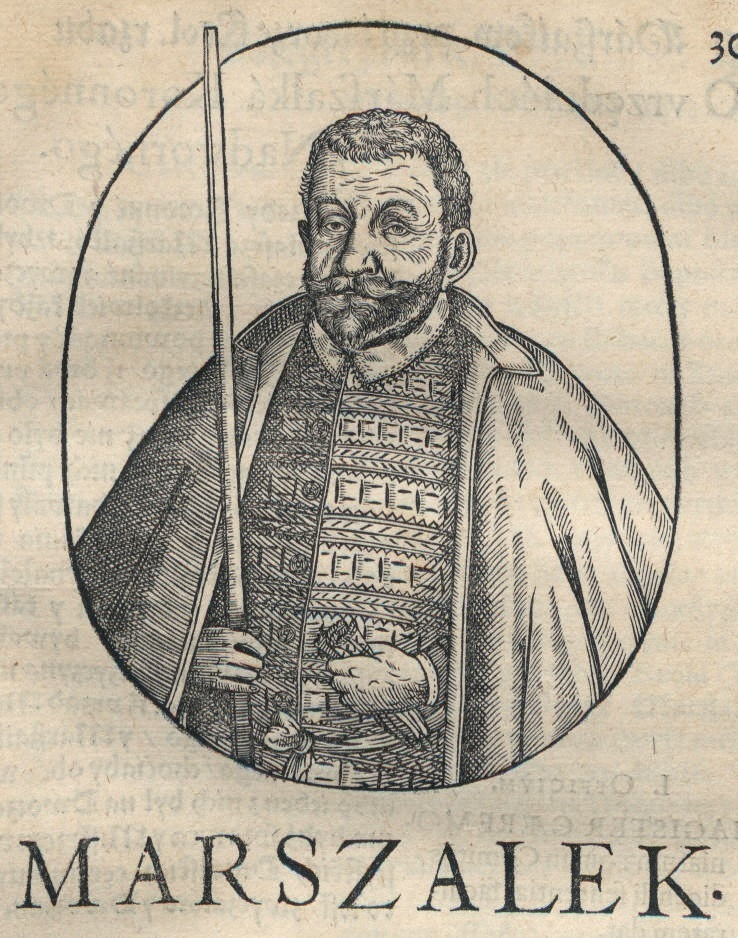
- Coat of arms: Clan Łodzia
- Born: 1540
- Died: 1593 (aged 52–53)
- Family: Opaliński
- Spouse: Katarzyna Kościelecka
- Issue: Gertruda Opalińska; Zofia Jadwiga Opalińska; Piotr Opaliński; Dorota Opalińska; Gertruda (Gierusza) Opalińska; Jadwiga Opalińska; Andrzej Opaliński; Łukasz Opaliński
- Father: Maciej Opaliński
- Mother: Jadwiga Lubrańska

Andrzej Opaliński (1540–1593), of Łodzia coat of arms, was a Polish–Lithuanian nobleman, Crown Court Marshal from 1572; Crown Grand Marshal from 1574, and starosta of Greater Poland from 1598.

In 1575 supported Maximilian II, Holy Roman Emperor for the Polish crown. During next interregnum he was loyal to Sigismund III Vasa. About this time began his conflict with Jan Zamoyski.

He was one of the members of the Polish delegation negotiating the Treaty of Bytom and Będzin in 1589.
