= Zdzisław Spieralski =

Polish historian and journalist

Zdzisław Spieralski (9 May 1927 – 26 February 1983) was a Polish historian and journalist.

He was studying history at the University of Łódź. In 1963 he gained a Ph.D. from the University of Warsaw. Spieralski had been working as a journalist since 1949. He had been working at the Instytut Historii PAN since 1972. He was specialist at the Polish military history from 15th to 17th century.

== Books ==
- W walce z najazdem szwedzkim, MON 1956 (with Zbigniew Kuchowicz)
- Bitwa pod Koronowem 10 X 1410, Bydgoszcz 1961
- Awantury mołdawskie, Wiedza Powszechna 1967
- Stefan Czarniecki, 1604-1665, Wydawnictwa MON, Warszawa 1974
- Jan Tarnowski 1488-1561, MON Warszawa 1977
- 500 zagadek o dawnym wojsku polskim, Wiedza Powszechna, 1977
- Jan Zamoyski, Wiedza Powszechna 1989
