= Reiter =

Type of heavy cavalry armed with pistols and a sword

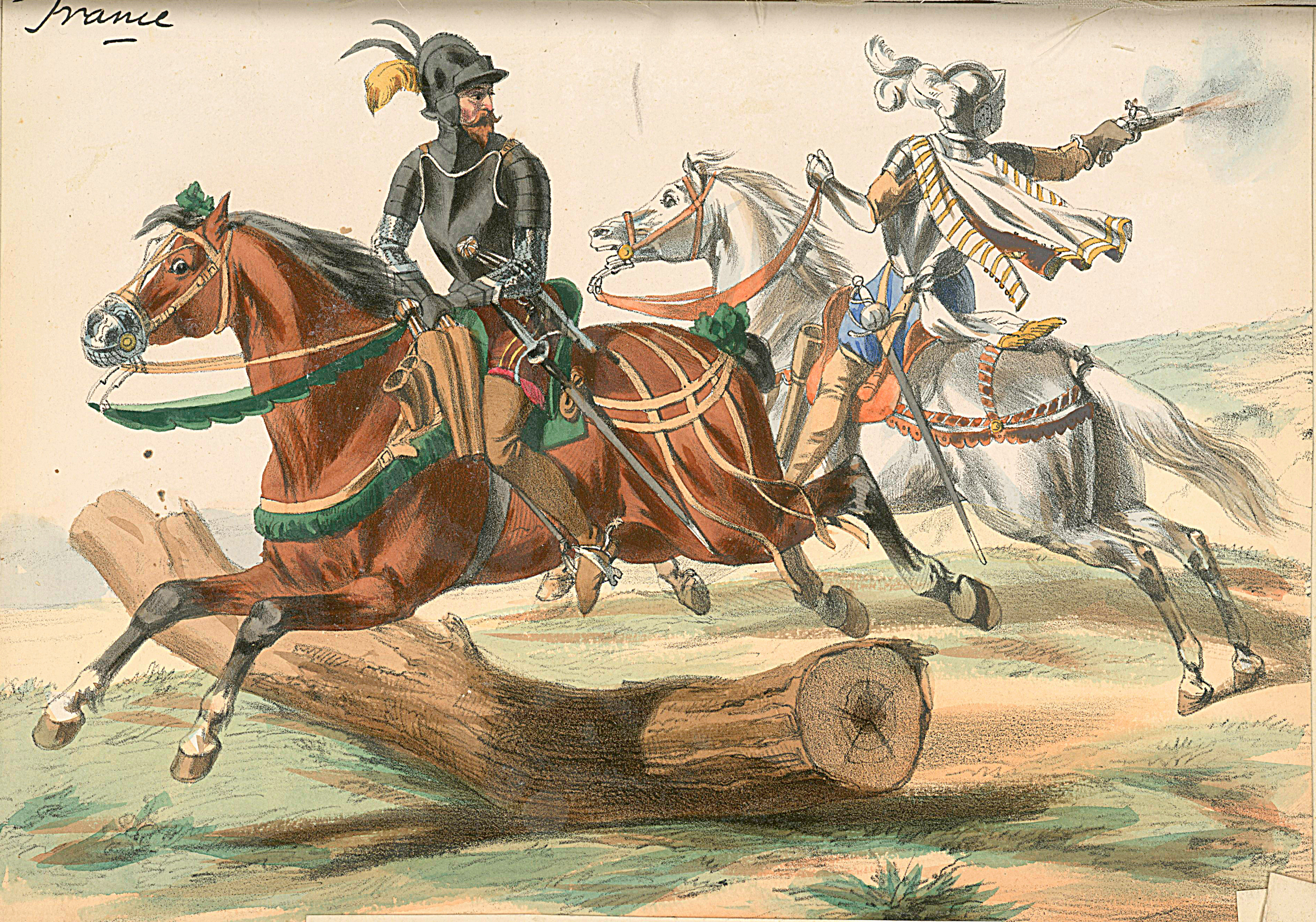
Reiter cavalry, c. 1575-1650

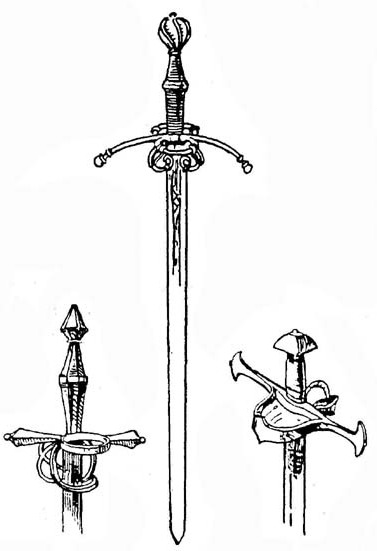
Reiterschwerter (Reiter swords) from Wendelin Boeheim, Waffenkunde (1890), figs. 281–283

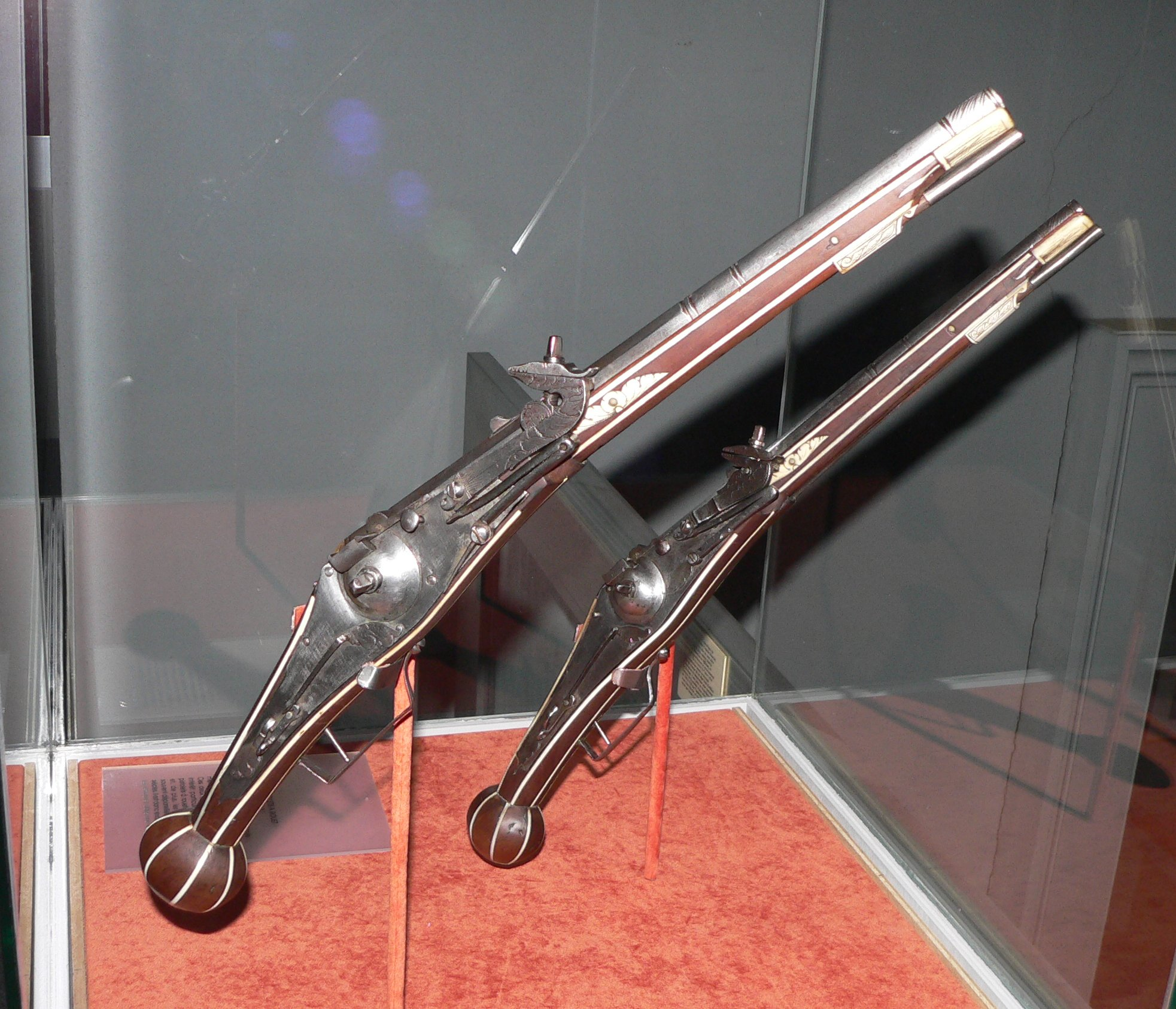
A matched set of Reiter's pistols (German: Reiterpistole)

Reiter or Schwarze Reiter ("black riders", anglicized swart reiters) were a type of cavalry in 16th to 17th century Central Europe including Holy Roman Empire, Polish–Lithuanian Commonwealth, Tsardom of Russia, and others.

Contemporary to the cuirassier and lancer cavalry, they used smaller horses, for which reason they were also known as Ringerpferde (corresponding to the French Argoulets). They were originally recruited in the North German Plain, west of the Oder river at the time of the Schmalkaldic War (1546–1547).

The Reiter raised firearms to the status of primary weapons for cavalry, as opposed to earlier Western European heavy cavalry which primarily relied upon melee weapons. A Reiter's main weapons were two or more pistols and a sword; most Reiters wore helmets and cuirasses and often additional armor for the arms and legs; sometimes they also carried a long cavalry firearm known as an arquebus or a carbine (although this type of horsemen soon became regarded as a separate class of cavalry—the arquebusier or in England as the harquebusier).

In general, commanders expected Reiters to be able to engage their opponents both with firearms and with swords. In the 16th century and up to about 1620, Reiters often formed up in deep blocks and used their firearms in a caracole attack in the hopes of disordering enemy infantry before charging home and engaging in hand-to-hand combat. However, enterprising commanders such as Henry IV (died 1610) and Gustavus Adolphus (died 1632) preferred to employ their Reiters and other heavy cavalry in a more aggressive manner, ordering them to press the charge, fire their pistols at point-blank range (especially against well-armored enemies) and fall in with their swords. Using either or both of these tactics, Reiters could be very effective when properly employed. A particular case in point is the Battle of Turnhout in 1597, where a force of Dutch Reiters under Maurice of Nassau defeated the opposing Spanish lancers and then routed the Spanish pike-and-shot infantry with a combination of pistol volleys and sword-in-hand charges.

The Reiters mostly consisted of Germans and served in the armies of the German states, in Sweden as "ryttare", in Poland as Polish: "rajtaria", and elsewhere. Reiter regiments (Russian: рейтары, romanized: reytary) also operated in Russian armies between the 1630s and the early 18th century (see Regiments of the new order).

During the late 17th century, Reiters gradually merged into generic cavalry regiments and were no longer seen as a distinct class of horsemen.

The designation Reiter did however survive until 1918 as part of the title of one of the two Saxon heavy cavalry regiments: Königlich-Sächsisches Gardereiter-Regiment.

== See also ==
- Dragoon—Another type of pistol-armed cavalry
