= Łodzia coat of arms =

Polish coat of arms

Łodzia
- Battle cry: Jelita, Nagody
- Alternative names: Lodzic, Navis, Nawa, Framberg, Fragenbarg, Frymbark
- Earliest mention: 1303 (seal)
- Cities: Łódź, Turobin
- Families: 161 names Babolicki, Babonaubek, Bandlewski, Baranowski, Barański, Baszkowski, Baubonalik, Baubonaubek, Będlewski, Bieczyński, Bieniecki, Biliński-Taras, Billewicz, de Bnin Bniński, Bobiatyński, Bobolecki, Bolewski, Borzychowski, Borzykowski, Borzyskowski, Brocki, Brodnicki, Brodzki, Byliński, Chrząstowski, Chwiłowicz, Czarnecki, Czarniecki, Czerwiakowski, Czołczyński, Dachowski, Dobratycki, Florkowski, Glasser, Głembocki, Gorayski, Gowarzewski, de Górka, Górski, Gurski, Herman, Iłowiecki, Iwanowski, Iwiński, Jałowiecki, Katlewski, Ketnarski, Kicharski, Klimenko, Klukowski, Kłodzianowski, Kobyliński, Kokorzyński, Komornicki, Konarzewski, Kopaszewski, Korytowski, Kossowski, Kotek, Kotka, Kreczkowski, Krzecki, Krzeczkowski, Krzeszyński, Krzęcki, Księski, Księski, Kukuła, Kunowski, Kunratowski, Kurnatowski, Lachowicki, Lachowicz, Lachowski, Lebecki, Lebiedzki, Ledziński, Ludomski, Ludowicz, Łabęcki, Łodzia, Łotocki, Łódzki, Łutkiewicz, Michalski, Miczucha, Mienych, Moszczeński, Moszczyński, Moszyński, Mościński, Mulinowicz, Muszyński, Naramowski (Poznań burghers of German origin, formerly surnamed 'Zeth', purchased Castle Naramowice, allegedly ennobled and adopted into the clan by the lords of Górka and the de Bnin Opaliński), Nieziołyński, Niziołyński, Nojewski, Opaleński, de Bnin Opaliński (de Opalenica), Ordęga, Osipowicz, Osipowski, Osypowski, Oszypowski, Ożepowski, Pęperzyński, Podwodowski, Pokorszyński, Pokorzyński, Pokoszyński, Poniński, Powilewicz, Powodowski, Przekora, Puzyk, Rabieński, Rabiński, Radzewski, Rąbiński, Reczyczanin, Rogaliński, Rostkiewicz, Rostkowicz, Roszkiewicz, Roszkowski, Sabkowski, Sapkowski, Sierosławski, Słabiej, Słabkowski, Słapkowski, Służowski, Smogorzewski, Stabkowski, Starczynowski, Starkowiecki, Starkowski, Starowolski, Sulkowski, Sułkowski, Szkałowski, Szmigielski, Szołdrski, Śmigielski, Świerczewski, Taczalski, Tłocki, Tłoski, Tomicki, Trocki, Tumicki, Węgierski, Wojszek, Wyganowski, Zabiński, Zdziechowski, Zdzychowski, Zgórski, Zgurski, Żabiński, Żyrowiecki, Żytowiecki

Łodzia (obsolete Polish for "boat") is a Polish coat of arms. It was used by many noble families of the Kingdom of Poland and the Polish–Lithuanian Commonwealth. A variant serves as the coat of arms of the city of Łódź (the city's name literally means "Boat"). It is a classic example of the so-called canting arms well known in European heraldry as it was borne by the medieval lords de Łodzia (a feudal lordship) and their clan. Hence the boat in the shield, clearly alluding to the estate's name literally meaning Boat. Coats of Arms in the Polish Lithuanian Commonwealth were a symbol of a heraldic clan.

== History ==
Łodzia is one of the oldest Polish coats of arms. Its earliest appearance (1303) is on a seal belonging to Wojciech of Krośno, Palatine of Kalisz. The first blazon description dates from 1411.

The first Łodzia coat of arms featured a golden letter M on the shield, and a boat in the crest. That version was used by Mikołaj of Łodzia in 1301. By 1315, however, all the bearers of the coat of arms had adopted the version used by Wojciech of Krośno. Initially the coat of arms had a checkerboard background, which by 1382 had been supplanted by a plain red field.

Until the 16th century, variously shaped boats were depicted. After the publication of Bartosz Paprocki's Herby rycerstwa polskiego (The Coats-of-Arms of Polish Chivalry, 1584), most authors adopted the present version. Paprocki was also the first to mention the crest as comprising peacock feathers with boat superimposed.

The Łodzia coat of arms was used by over 150 families, mostly around Kalisz, Poznań and Sieradz. After the Union of Horodło, it was also adopted by several Lithuanian families.

== Blazon ==
Gules, a rudderless and mastless boat Or.

== Notable bearers ==
Notable members of the clan and bearers of this coat of arms include:

- House of Czarniecki
  - Stefan Czarniecki (consort Sofia Kobierzycka)
- House of Opaliński
  - Andrzej Opaliński (1540–1593), Great Crown Marshal
  - Andrzej Opaliński (1575–1623), Bishop of Poznań
  - Łukasz de Bnin Opaliński, Castellan of Poznań
  - Łukasz de Bnin Opaliński, poet, Court Marshal of the Crown
  - House of Kurnatowski
  - Zygmunt Łodzia Kurnatowski
  - Łukasz Górka z Górki h. Łodzia, [[komornik [cen] dwór królewski (1433), podczaszy [poz] Poznań (1438), starosta generalny [poz] Wielkopolska, starosta [poz] Kościan (1441), starosta [str] pobiedziskie, wojewoda [poz] Poznań (1441-1475)]]
  - Piotr Starkowiecki, translator of Ottoman Turkish, Persian, and Arabic.

== Gallery ==
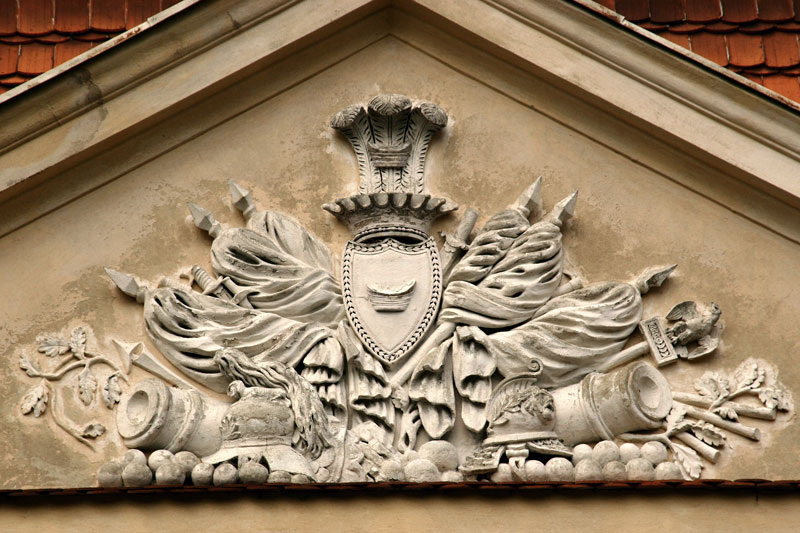
Palace in Gułtowy

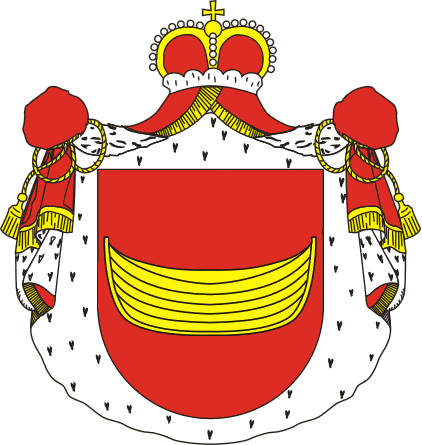
Princes Poniński

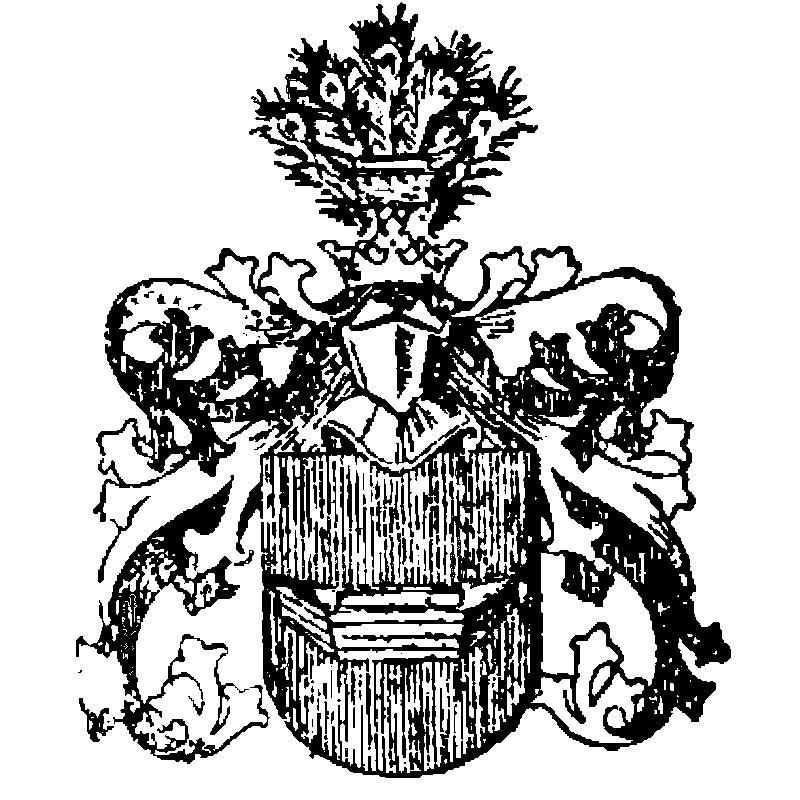
Łodzia in "Orgelbrand Encyclopedia", 1901

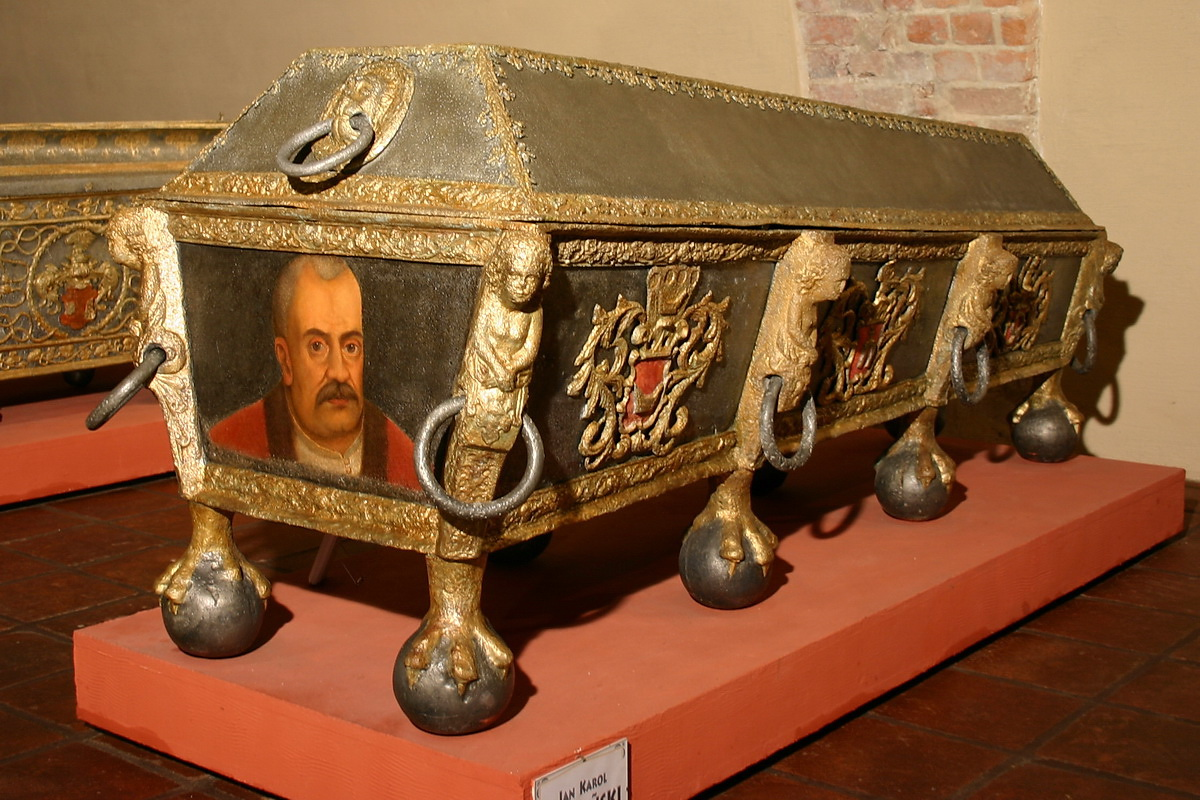
The Łodzia coat of arms on Jan Karol Opaliński sarcophagus

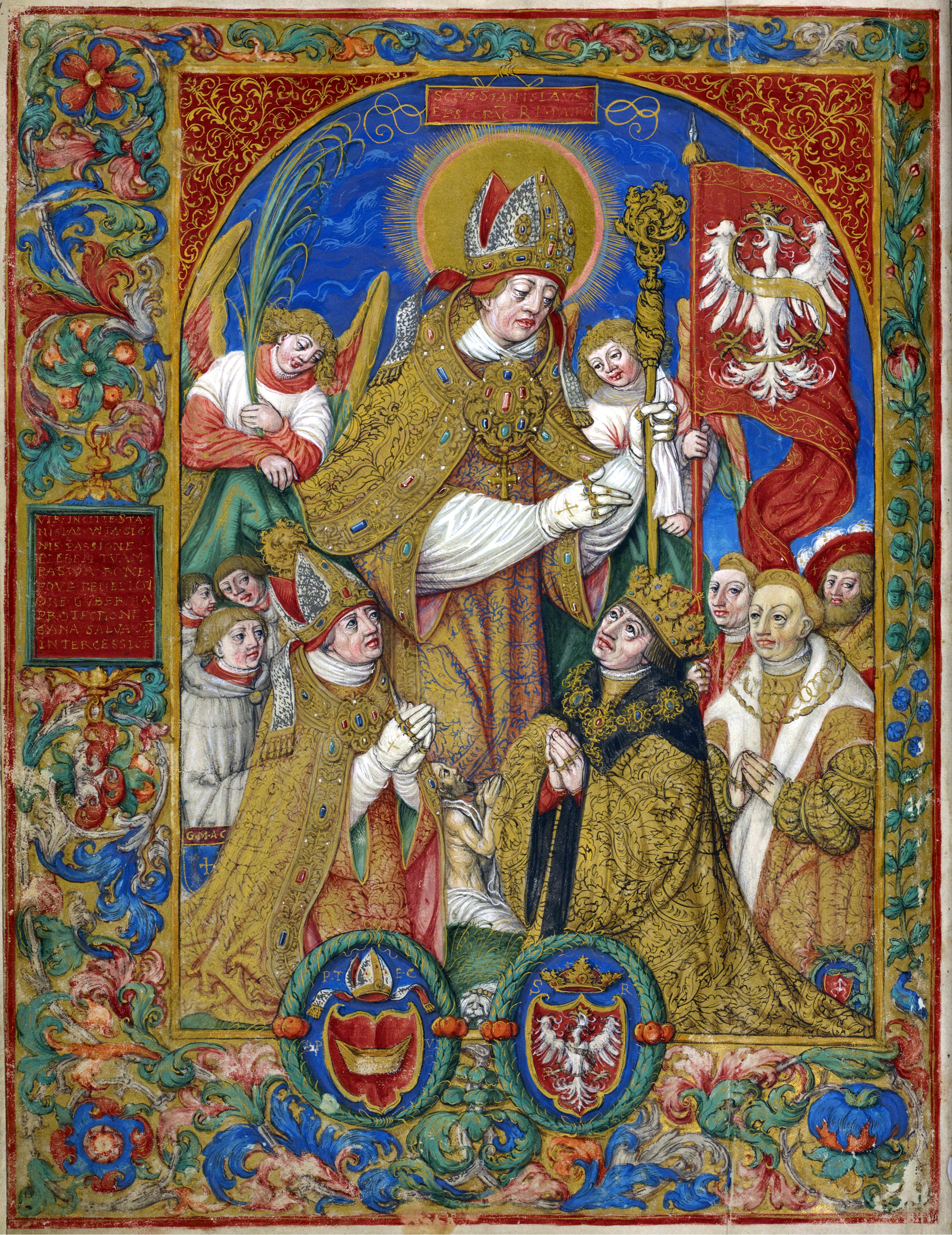
Painting of Saint Stanislaus

Counts Bniński

== See also ==
- Polish heraldry
- Heraldic family
- List of Polish nobility coats of arms

== Bibliography ==
- Kasper Niesiecki: Herbarz Polski (Polish Armorial), Lwów, 1738
- Tadeusz Gajl: Herbarz polski od średniowiecza do XX wieku : ponad 4500 herbów szlacheckich 37 tysięcy nazwisk 55 tysięcy rodów. L&L, 2007. ISBN 978-83-60597-10-1.
