= Leszek Podhorodecki =

Polish historian, writer, and teacher

Leszek Podhorodecki (1934 – 7 December 2000) was a Polish historian and writer. A secondary school teacher, he published over 40 different books about the history of Poland, as well as dozens of academic articles and other publications.

== Bibliography ==
- Chanat krymski i jego stosunki z Polską w XV-XVIII wieku
- Chocim 1621
- Dzieje rodu Chodkiewiczów
- Hetman Jan Karol Chodkiewicz 1560-1621
- Hetman Jan Zamoyski 1542-1605
- Hetman Stanisław Koniecpolski ok. 1591-1646
- Hetman Żółkiewski
- Historia Polski 1796-1997
- Kulikowe Pole 1380
- Lepanto 1571
- Rapier i koncerz
- Sicz Zaporoska
- Sławne bitwy Polaków
- Sławni hetmani Rzeczypospolitej
- Sobiescy herbu Janina
- Stefan Czarniecki
- Tatarzy
- Wazowie w Polsce
- Wiedeń 1683
- Władysław IV 1595-1648
- Zarys dziejów Ukrainy
