= List of Polish films of the 1960s =

List of films produced in the Cinema of Poland in the 1960s.

Title	Director	Cast	Genre	Notes
1960
Bad Luck	Andrzej Munk	Bogumił Kobiela	Comedy	Entered into the 1960 Cannes Film Festival
Knights of the Teutonic Order	Aleksander Ford	Grażyna Staniszewska, Urszula Modrzyńska, Mieczysław Kalenik, Aleksander Fogiel	Historical Drama	
1961
Mother Joan of the Angels	Jerzy Kawalerowicz	Mieczysław Voit, Lucyna Winnicka, Anna Ciepielewska, Franciszek Pieczka	Horror	Won the Special Jury Prize at the 1961 Cannes Film Festival Adapted from Jarosław Iwaszkiewicz 's novel of the same name Also known as The Devil and the Nun
Ogniomistrz Kaleń	Ewa Petelska, Czesław Petelski	Wiesław Gołas	War movie	
Tonight a City Will Die	Jan Rybkowski	Andrzej Łapicki	Historical Drama	Entered into the 2nd Moscow International Film Festival
1962
All Souls' Day	Tadeusz Konwicki	Ewa Krzyżewska, Edmund Fetting	Drama	
The Impossible Goodbye	Stanisław Jędryka	Wiesław Gołas		Entered into the 1962 Cannes Film Festival
Knife in the Water	Roman Polanski	Leon Niemczyk, Jolanta Umecka, Zygmunt Malanowicz	Psychological Thriller	Nominated for Best Foreign Language Film at the 1963 Academy Awards, won the FIPRESCI Prize at the 1962 Venice Film Festival
1963
Black Wings	Ewa Petelska, Czesław Petelski	Kazimierz Opaliński	Drama	Entered into the 3rd Moscow International Film Festival Adapted from Juliusz Kaden-Bandrowski's novel of the same name
How to Be Loved	Wojciech Has	Zbigniew Cybulski, Barbara Krafftówna	Historical Drama	Entered into the 1963 Cannes Film Festival Adapted from Kazimierz Brandys's novel with the same name
Passenger	Andrzej Munk	Aleksandra Śląska	Drama	Entered into the 1964 Cannes Film Festival
1964
The First Day of Freedom	Aleksander Ford	adeusz Łomnicki	Drama	Entered into the 1965 Cannes Film Festival
Prawo i pięść	Jerzy Hoffman	Gustaw Holoubek	Historical Drama	Adapted from Józef Hen's novel Toast
1965
The Ashes	Andrzej Wajda	Daniel Olbrychski	Drama	Entered into the 1966 Cannes Film Festival Adapted from Stefan Żeromski's novel of the same name.
The Saragossa Manuscript	Wojciech Has	Zbigniew Cybulski, Iga Cembrzyńska, Joanna Jędryka	Historical Drama	Adapted from Jan Potocki's novel The Manuscript Found in Saragossa
Three Steps on Earth	Jerzy Hoffman, Edward Skórzewski	Irena Orska	Drama	Entered into the 4th Moscow International Film Festival
1966
Bariera	Jerzy Skolimowski	Joanna Szczerbic, Jan Nowicki	Comedy drama	
Pharaoh	Jerzy Kawalerowicz	Jerzy Zelnik, Piotr Pawłowski, Leszek Herdegen, Wiesława Mazurkiewicz, Barbara Brylska	Egyptian history. Politics.	Adapted from Bolesław Prus' novel, Pharaoh. Entered into the 1966 Cannes Film Festival
1967
Westerplatte	Stanisław Różewicz	Zygmunt Hübner, Arkadiusz Bazak	Historical	Entered into the 5th Moscow International Film Festival
1968
Colonel Wolodyjowski	Jerzy Hoffman	Tadeusz Łomnicki, Daniel Olbrychski, Mieczyslaw Pawlikowski, Magdalena Zawadzka	Historical drama	Entered into the 6th Moscow International Film Festival Adapted from Nobel Prize laureate Henryk Sienkiewicz's novel Pan Wołodyjowski.
The Doll	Wojciech Jerzy Has	Beata Tyszkiewicz, Mariusz Dmochowski	Drama	Adapted from Bolesław Prus's novel The Doll
Matthew's Days	Witold Leszczyński	Franciszek Pieczka	Drama	Due to compete at the 1968 Cannes Film Festival
1969
How I Unleashed World War II	Tadeusz Chmielewski	Marian Kociniak	Historical comedy	Adapted Kazimierz Sławiński's novel Przygody kanoniera Dolasa (The Adventures of Dolas the Cannoneer)
Hunting Flies	Andrzej Wajda	Zygmunt Malanowicz, Małgorzata Braunek	Comedy	Entered into the 1969 Cannes Film Festival
