= List of Polish war films =

This is a list of Polish war films.

== 1 ==
- 11 listopada by Kamil Kulczycki & Urszula Szałata, 2008
- 111 dni letargu by Jerzy Sztwiertnia, 1985

== A ==
- Agent nr 1 by Zbigniew Kuźmiński, 1971
- Akcja pod Arsenałem by Jan Łomnicki, 1978

== B ==
- Biały niedźwiedź by Jerzy Zarzycki, 1959
- Bołdynby Ewa Petelska & Czesław Petelski, 1981

== C ==
- C.K. Dezerterzy by Janusz Majewski, 1986
- Ciemna rzeka by Sylwester Szyszko, 1973
- Czarna suknia by Janusz Majewski, 1967
- Czas honoru by Michał Kwieciński, Michał Rosa, Wojciech Wójcik, 2008
- Czterej pancerni i pies by Konrad Nałęcki & Andrzej Czekalski, 1966

== D ==
- Daleko od okna by Jan Jakub Kolski, 2000
- Demony wojny wg Goi by Władysław Pasikowski, 1998
- Do góry nogami by Stanisław Jędryka, 1982
- Dzień czwarty by Ludmiła Niedbalska, 1984
- Dziś w nocy umrze miasto by Jan Rybkowski, 1961

== E ==
- Eroica by Andrzej Munk, 1958

== G ==
- Gdzie jest generał... by Tadeusz Chmielewski, 1964
- Giuseppe w Warszawie by Stanisław Lenartowicz, 1964
- Godzina "W" by Janusz Morgenstern, 1980
- Gwiaździsta eskadra by Leonard Buczkowski, 1930

== H ==
- Hubal by Bohdan Poręba, 1973

== J ==
- Jak być kochaną by Wojciech Jerzy Has, 1963
- Jak rozpętałem drugą wojnę światową by Tadeusz Chmielewski, 1970
- Jeszcze tylko ten las by Jan Łomnicki, 1991

== K ==
- Kanał by Andrzej Wajda, 1957
- Kartka z podróży by Waldemar Dziki, 1983
- Kierunek Berlin by Jerzy Passendorfer, 1968
- Kolumbowie by Janusz Morgenstern, 1970
- Kornblumenblau, Leszek Wosiewicz, 1988
- Kwestia sumienia, Ewa Petelska & Czesław Petelski, 1967
- Kwiecień by Witold Lesiewicz, 1961

== L ==
- Lotna by Andrzej Wajda, 1959

== N ==
- Na białym szlaku by Jarosław Brzozowski & Andrzej Wróbel, 1962
- Nagrody i odznaczenia by Jan Łomnicki, 1974
- Nieznany by Witold Lesiewicz, 1964

== O ==
- Oblężenie (Stawka większa niż życie) by Andrzej Konic & Janusz Morgenstern, 1968
- Ocalić miasto by Jan Łomnicki, 1976
- Ogniomistrz Kaleń by Ewa Petelska & Czesław Petelski, 1961
- ogniem i mieczem 1999
- Olimpiada '40 by Andrzej Kotkowski, 1980
- Opadły liście z drzew by Stanisław Różewicz, 1975
- Opowieść w czerwieni by Henryk Kluba, 1974
- Orzeł by Leonard Buczkowski, 1959
- Oszołomienie by Jerzy Sztwiertnia, 1989

== P ==
- Palace Hotel by Ewa Kruk, 1977
- Partita na instrument drewniany by Janusz Zaorski, 1975
- Pasażerka by Andrzej Munk & Witold Lesiewicz, 1963
- Pianista by Roman Polanski, 2002
- Pierścionek z orłem w koronie by Andrzej Wajda, 1992
- Pogranicze w ogniu by Andrzej Konic, 1992
- Pokolenie by Andrzej Wajda, 1955
- Polskie drogi by Janusz Morgenstern, 1977
- Potem nastąpi cisza by Janusz Morgenstern, 1966
- Pożegnania by Wojciech Jerzy Has, 1958

== R ==
- Ranny w lesie by Janusz Nasfeter, 1963
- Rok pierwszy by Witold Lesiewicz, 1960

== S ==
- Stawka większa niż życie by Andrzej Konic & Janusz Morgenstern, 1968
- Sto koni do stu brzegów by Zbigniew Kuźmiński, 1978
- Sławna jak Sarajewo by Janusz Kidawa, 1987

== T ==
- Tajemnica Enigmy by Roman Wionczek, 1980
- Tajemnica twierdzy szyfrów by Adek Drabiński, 2007
- Tajemnica Westerplatte by Paweł Chochlew & Jarosław Żamojda, 2009
- Trzecia część nocy by Andrzej Żuławski, 1972
- Trzecia granica by Wojciech Solarz & Lech Lorentowicz, 1976

== U ==
- Umarłem, aby żyć by Stanisław Jędryka, 1984
- Urodziny młodego warszawiaka by Ewa Petelska & Czesław Petelski, 1980

== V ==
- Wołyń

== W ==
- W te dni przedwiosenne by Andrzej Konic, 1975
- Westerplatte by Stanisław Różewicz, 1967
- Wielka droga by Michał Waszyński, 1946
- Wrota Europy by Jerzy Wójcik, 1999
- Wszyscy i nikt by Konrad Nałęcki, 1977
- Wyrok na Franciszka Kłosa by Andrzej Wajda, 2000
- Wyrok śmierci by Witold Orzechowski, 1980

== Z ==
- Za wami pójdą inni by Antoni Bohdziewicz, 1949
- Zakazane piosenki by Leonard Buczkowski, 1947
- Zamach by Jerzy Passendorfer, 1958
- Zapamiętaj imię swoje by Siergiej Kołosow, 1974
- Znicz olimpijski by Lech Lorentowicz, 1969
- Znikąd donikąd by Kazimierz Kutz, 1975
- Zwariowana noc by Zbigniew Kuźmiński, 1967
- Złoto dezerterów by Janusz Majewski, 1998
