= List of Polish films of the 1950s =

List of films produced in the Cinema of Poland in the 1950s.

Title	Director	Cast	Genre	Notes
1950
Unvanquished City	Jerzy Zarzycki			Entered into the 1951 Cannes Film Festival
Dwie brygady	Wadim Berestowski			
Pierwszy start	Leonard Buczkowski			
1951
Gromada	Jerzy Kawalerowicz			
Młodość Chopina	Aleksander Ford	Czesław Wołłejko, Aleksandra Śląska		
Pierwsze dni	Jan Rybkowski			
Die Sonnenbrucks	Georg C. Klaren			
Warsaw Premiere	Jan Rybkowski	Jan Koecher, Barbara Kostrzewska	Historical	
Załoga	Jan Fethke			
1953
Celuloza	Jerzy Kawalerowicz			
Domek z kart	Erwin Axer			
Pościg	Stanisław Urbanowicz			
Przygoda na Mariensztacie	Leonard Buczkowski			
Sprawa do załatwienia	Jan Rybkowski			
Trudna miłość	Stanisław Różewicz			
Trzy opowieści	Czesław Petelski, Konrad Nałęcki, Ewa Poleska			
Żołnierz zwycięstwa	Wanda Jakubowska			
1954
Five Boys from Barska Street	Aleksander Ford			Entered into the 1954 Cannes Film Festival
1955
A Generation	Andrzej Wajda	Tadeusz Łomnicki, Urszula Modrzyńska	War	
Irena do domu!	Jan Fethke	Lidia Wysocka, Adolf Dymsza	comedy	
1956
Kanał	Andrzej Wajda			Entered into the 1957 Cannes Film Festival
Man on the Tracks	Andrzej Munk	Kazimierz Opalinski		
1957
The Real End of the Great War	Jerzy Kawalerowicz	Lucyna Winnicka	Drama	
1958
Ashes and Diamonds	Andrzej Wajda	Zbigniew Cybulski	War	
Rainy July (pl)	Leonard Buczkowski	Urszula Modrzynska, Ryszard Barycz, Jan Kurnakowicz		
1959
Argument About Basia				
Night Train	Jerzy Kawalerowicz	Lucyna Winnicka, Leon Niemczyk	Thriller	
The Eagle	Leonard Buczkowski			Entered into the 1st Moscow International Film Festival
