= 17th Locarno Film Festival =

Film festival in Locarno, Switzerland

- Location: Locarno, Switzerland
- Founded: 1946
- Awards: Golden Sail: Black Peter directed by Miloš Forman
- Festival date: Opening: 22 July 1964; Closing: 3 August 1964
- Website: Locarno Film Festival

Locarno Film Festival
- 18th 16th

The 17th Locarno Film Festival was held from 22 July to 3 August 1964 in Locarno, Switzerland. This was the first year the festival was officially recognized and, in part, funded by the central Swiss government. This was a huge win for longtime artistic director of the festival, Vinicio Beretta, who also oversaw the festival being recognized by the Motion Picture Export Association of America (now known as the MPA) while maintaining the festival's official recognition by FIAPF. Retrospectively, this year at the festival is considered important in bringing the Czech New Wave to the attention of global film critics and audiences.

The Golden Sail award, the festival's top prize, was awarded to Black Peter directed by Miloš Forman. Other notable winners included Hideko Takamine (Best Actress) and Gene Kelly (Best Actor).

== Official Sections ==
The following films were screened to audiences in this section:

=== Main Program ===
Main Program / Feature Films In Competition

Original Title	English Title	Director(s)	Year	Production Country
Bande à part	Band of Outsiders	Jean-Luc Godard	1964	France
Černý Petr	Black Peter	Miloš Forman	1964	Czechoslovakia
Comizi D'Amore	Love Meetings	Pier Paolo Pasolini	1964	Italy
Danses De Notre Nation	Dances of Our Nation	Chu Chinming		China
Den Stchastia	The Stchastia	Iossif Kheifitz	1963	Russia
Gade Uden Ende	Street without End	Morgens Vemmer	1963	Denmark
Go-Daan		Trilok Jetly	1963	India
Good Neighbour Sam		David Swift	1964	United States
Goodbye In The Mirror		Storm de Hirsch	1964	United States
Kennwort....Reiher	The River Line	Rudolf Jugert	1964	Germany
La Calda Vita	The Warm Life	Florestano Vancini	1963	Italy
La Herencia	The Inheritance	Ricardo Alventosa	1964	Argentina
La Ragazza In Prestito	The Girl on Loan	Alfredo Giannetti	1964	Italy
Le Schiave Esistono Ancora	The Slaves Still Exist	Roberto Malenotti, Folco Quilici	1964	Italy
Les Apprentis	The Apprentices	Alain Tanner	1964	Switzerland
Midareru	Yearning	Mikio Naruse	1964	Japan
Naganiacz		Eva Petelski, Czeslaw Petelski	1964	Poland
Nappali Sötetseg	Daytime in Front	Zoltan Fabri	1963	Hungary
New-York-Sur-Mer		Pierre Dominique Gaisseau	1964	France
Os Verdes Anos	The Green Years	Paulo Rocha	1963	Portugal
Square Roots Of Zero		Doran William Cannon	1963	United States
Tiempo De Amor	Love Time	Julio Diamante	1964	Spain
Trois Femmes: 1) Caroline	Three Women: 1) Caroline	Georges Dufaux, Clément Perron		Canada
Trois Femmes: 2) Francoise (Il Y Eut Un Soir... Il Y Eut Un Matin)	Three Women: 2) Francoise (There Was One Evening ... There Was One Morning)	Pierre Patry		Canada
Trois Femmes: 3) Solange Dans Nos Campagnes Ou Tres Peu Pour Moi, Le Soleil	Three Women: 3) Solange in Our Countryside or Very Little for Me, the Sun	Gilles Carles		Canada
Vysokà Zed	The High Wall	Darel Kachyna	1964	Czechoslovakia
What A Way To Go		J. Lee Thompson	1964	United States

Main Program / Short Films In Competition

Original Title	English Title	Director(s)	Year	Production Country
A Caça	The Hunt	Manoel de Oliveira	1963	Portugal
A Comedy Tale Of Fanny Hill		Leslie Goodwins		United States
Begegnungen	Encounters	Hans Trommer		Switzerland
Botan		Yoji Kuri		Japan
En Ny Virkelighed	A New Reality	Borge Host		Denmark
Et Adarim	And to Adarim	Mimish Herbst		Israel
Exemple: Etretat	Example: Etretat	Monique Lepeuve		France
Franz Marc		Karl F. de Vogt		Germany
Ghazala	Ghazal	Zafar Iqbal Khan		Pakistan
Hangman		Les Goldman, Paul Julian		United States
Het Feest	Let's Have A Party	Paul Verhoeven	1963	Netherlands
Ideal		Břetislav Pojar		Czechoslovakia
Kuchari	Cookie	Ivan Hustava		Czechoslovakia
La Cena Di San Giuseppe	San Giuseppe's Dinner	Giuseppe Ferrara		Italy
La Pampa Gringa	The Gringa Pampas	Fernando Birri	1963	Argentina
La Vie Des Oiseaux En Mauritanie	The Life of Birds in Mauritania	Jean Dragesco		France
Le Pele	And Before	Moritz De Hadeln, Walter Marti		Switzerland
Le Rossignol De Siberie	The Rossignol De Siberie	André Paratte		Switzerland
Letitia		Stig Björkman		Sudan
Poesia Dei Macchiaioli	Poetry of the Macchiaioli	Riccardo Redi, Mario Verdone		Italy
Pour L'Espagne	For Spain	Frédéric Rossif		France
Renk Duvarlari	Color Walls	Pierre Biro		Turkey
Requiem Dla 500.000	Requiem for 500,000	Jerzy Bossak, Waclaw Kazmierczak		Poland
Romantyczna Przygoda	Romantic Adventure	Lechosław Marszalek		Poland
Schleifen	Grind	Michael Wolfensinger		Switzerland
Service De Nuit	Night Service	Yu Chi		China
The Performance		William Bryden		Great Britain
Transfiguration		Ludwig Dutkiewicz		Australia
Wladimir Favorsky		Feodor Tiapkine		Russia

=== Out of Competition (Fuori Concorso) ===
Main Program / Feature Films Out of Competition

Original Title	English Title	Director(s)	Year	Production Country
Help! My Snowman's Burning Down		Carson Davidson	1964	United States
Nothing But The Best		Clive Donner	1964	Great Britain
Sedotta E Abbandonata	Seduced and Abandoned	Pietro Germi	1964	Italy
The Best Man		Franklin Schaffner	1964	United States
Vidas Secas	Dry Lives	Nelson Pereira dos Santos	1963	Brazil

Main Program / Short Films Out of Competition

Original Title	English Title	Director(s)	Year	Production Country
Chagall		Philippe Schffrin	1964	France
The One Nighters		Peter Collinson		Iceland

=== Special Sections - Tribute To ===
Tribute To Andrzej Munk (1921-1961)
Original Title	English Title	Director(s)	Year	Production Country
Błękitny krzyż	Men of the Blue Cross	Andrzej Munk	1955	Poland
Człowiek na torze	Man on the Tracks	Andrzej Munk	1956	Poland
Eroïca	Heroism	Andrzej Munk	1957	Poland
Gwiazdy Musza Polnac	The Stars Must be Hunted	Andrzej Munk	1954	Poland
Kolejarsky Slowo	Railway	Andrzej Munk	1953	Poland
Niedzielny Poranek	Sunday Morning	Andrzej Munk	1955	Poland
Pasażerka	Passenger	Andrzej Munk	1963	Poland
Spacerek Staromiejski	Staromiejski Walk	Andrzej Munk	1959	Poland
Zezowate szczęście	Bad Luck	Andrzej Munk	1960	Poland
Tribute To Friedrich Wilhelm Murnau (1988-1931)
Der letzte Mann	The Last Laugh	F. W. Murnau	1924	Germany
Die Finanzen des Großherzogs	The Grand Duke's Finances	F. W. Murnau	1924	Germany
4 Devils		F. W. Murnau	1928	United States
Nosferatu – Eine Symphonie des Grauens	Nosferatu: A Symphony of Horror	F. W. Murnau	1922	Germany
City Girl		F. W. Murnau	1930	United States
Sunrise: A Song of Two Humans		F. W. Murnau	1927	United States
Tabu: A Story of the South Seas		Robert Flaherty, F. W. Murnau	1931	United States
Tartuffe		F. W. Murnau	1926	Germany
Tribute To Louis Lumière (1864-1948)
N° 314 Genève (Exposition De 1896): Place Bel-Air	N ° 314 Geneva (Exhibition of 1896): Place Bel-Air	Louis Lumière		
N° 1134 (?) Genève (Exposition De 1896): Un Troupeau Suisse (?)	N ° 1134 (?) Geneva (Exhibition of 1896): a Swiss Herd (?)	Louis Lumière		
N° 1135 Lausanne: Panorama Pris D'Un Tramway	N ° 1135 Lausanne: Panorama Taken from a Tram	Louis Lumière		
N° 1136 Montreux: Fete Des Narcisses I. Marquises Dans Les Chaises A Porteurs	N ° 1136 Montreux: FETE DES NARCISS I. Marquesas in the Chairs with Carriers	Louis Lumière		
N° 1137 Montreux: Fete Des Narcisses Ii. Le Menuet	N ° 1137 Montreux: FETE DES NARCISSIES II. the Menuet	Louis Lumière		
N° 124 Evian: Barques	N ° 124 Evian: Boats	Louis Lumière		
N° 125 Evian: Embarquement	N ° 125 Evian: Boarding	Louis Lumière		
N° 126 Evian: Debarquement		Louis Lumière		
N° 308 Bâle: Pnt Sur Le Rhin	N ° 308 Basel: PNT on the Rhine	Louis Lumière		
N° 309 Genève (Exposition De 1896): Cascade	T	Louis Lumière		
N° 312 Genève (Exposition 1896): Fête Au Village	N ° 312 Geneva (Exhibition 1896): Festival in the Village	Louis Lumière		
N° 313 Genève (Exposition De 1896): Rentree A L'Etable	N ° 313 Geneva (Exhibition of 1896): Returned to the Etable	Louis Lumière		
N° 315 Interlaken: Procession		Louis Lumière		
N° 316 Lausanne: Defile Du 8Ème Bataillon	N ° 316 Lausanne: Defile of the 8th Battalion	Louis Lumière		
N° 317 Schaffouse: Chutes Du Rhin Vues De Pres	N ° 317 Schaffhouse: Rhine Falls Views	Louis Lumière		
N° 318 Schaffouse: Chutes Du Rhin Vues De Loin	N ° 318 Schaffouse: Rhine Falls Seen from Afar	Louis Lumière		
N° 630 Zermatt: Panorama Dans Les Alpes	N ° 630 Zermatt: Panorama in the Alps	Louis Lumière		
N° 631 Suisse: Exercices De Tir Par L'Artillerie	N ° 631 Switzerland: Artillery Shooting Exercises	Louis Lumière		
N° 93 Lausanne: Place St. François: Scieurs De Bois	N ° 93 Lausanne: Place St. François: Wooden Sawers	Louis Lumière		
N° Genève (Exposition De 1896): Cortège Arabe	Geneva Number (Exhibition of 1896): Arabic Procession	Louis Lumière		

== Official Awards ==
=== International Jury, feature films ===
- Golden Sail, feature films: Black Peter by Miloš Forman
- Silver Sail for Best Actress: Hideko Takamine in Yearning
- Silver Sail for Best Actor: Gene Kelly in What a Way to Go!
- Silver Sail for the Best First Feature: Os Verdes Anos by Paulo Rocha, Vysoká Zeď by Karel Kachyňa
- International Jury Mention, feature films: The Apprentices by Alain Tanner
- International Jury Special Prize, feature films: Naganiacz by Eva Petelski and Czeslaw Petelski, Nappli Sotetseg by Zoltan Fabri

=== International Jury, short films ===
- Golden Sail, Short Films: Exemple: Etretat by Monique Lepeuve
- Silver Sail, Short Films: Hangman by Paul Julian and Les Goldman, Letitia by Stig Björkman
- International Jury Mention, short films: Begegnunen by Hans Trommer, Het Feest by Paul Verhoeven, Botan by Yoji Kuri

=== FIPRESCI Jury ===
- FIPRESCI Prize: Naganiacz by Eva Petelski and Czeslaw Petelski

=== Youth Jury ===
- Youth Jury First Award: Black Peter by Miloš Forman
- Youth Jury second award: Bande à part by Jean-Luc Godard
