= Roman Kłosowski =

Polish actor

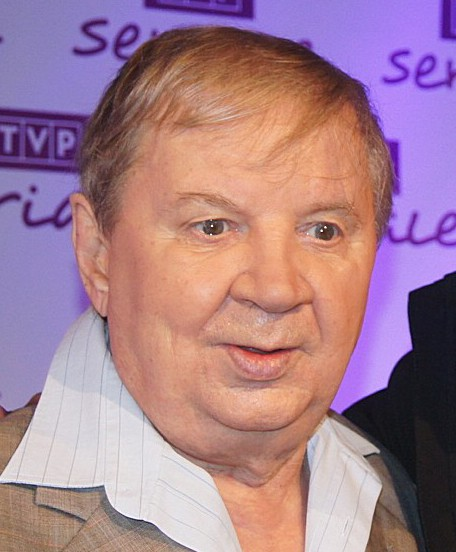
- Roman Kłosowski (2012)
- Born: 14 February 1929; Biała Podlaska, Poland
- Died: 11 June 2018 (aged 89); Łódź, Poland
- Resting place: Powązki Military Cemetery
- Education: Aleksander Zelwerowicz National Academy of Dramatic Art in Warsaw
- Occupations: Actor, Stage Director
- Years active: 1953–2013

Roman Kłosowski (14 February 1929 – 11 June 2018) was a Polish character actor and stage director.

== Biography ==
He was born on 14 February 1929 in Biała Podlaska. Graduate of the Aleksander Zelwerowicz National Academy of Dramatic Art's Faculty of Acting (1953) and Faculty of Directing (1965). He made his theater debut on 1 September 1953. Kłosowoski made his debut on stage as Puck in the production of Shakespeare's A Midsummer Night's Dream. He made his screen debut in 1953, starring in the film Celuloza by Jerzy Kawalerowicz. He would go on the star in another of Kawalerowicz's films, Shadow (Cień) in 1956, a film which was entered into the 1956 Cannes Film Festival. The film is a Rashōmon-like investigation into the life of a man found dead after having been hurled from a train.

Then in 1964 he starred in the Aleksander Ford film The First Day of Freedom which was entered into the 1965 Cannes Film Festival. Kłosowski starred alongside Tadeusz Łomnicki, Beata Tyszkiewicz and Tadeusz Fijewski. In the late 1960s he appeared in the World War II miniseries Czterej pancerni i pies. In 1971, he appeared in the Polish superhero comedy film, Hydrozagadka, portraying the Maharaja of Kabur. The film was directed by Andrzej Kondratiuk. From 1974 to 1976, he starred in the successful television comedy series Czterdziestolatek. In the years 1976–1981, he was the general and artistic director of the Powszechny Theater in Łódź, as well as a lecturer at the Acting Department of the Łódź Film School.

In 1986, he once again was directed by Andrzej Kondratiuk in the comedy-sci-fi television series Big Bang. Playing the character of Shepherd Kazimierz, he featured alongside actors such as Ludwik Benoit, Zofia Merle and Janusz Gajos. In 1989 he played the role of Edward in the Andrzej Barański's film, The Peddler. In 1996 he would again collaborate with Barański and appear in the psychological film, Dzień wielkiej ryby, in 1996.

Then in the 1990s he starred in the Polish sitcom series Świat według Kiepskich. In 2008 he portrayed Nostradamus in the comedy drama film, Before Twilight (Jeszcze nie wieczór).

Roman Kłosowski died on 11 June 2018 in Łódź. He was buried on 18 June 2018 at the Powązki Military Cemetery in Warsaw.

== Selected filmography ==
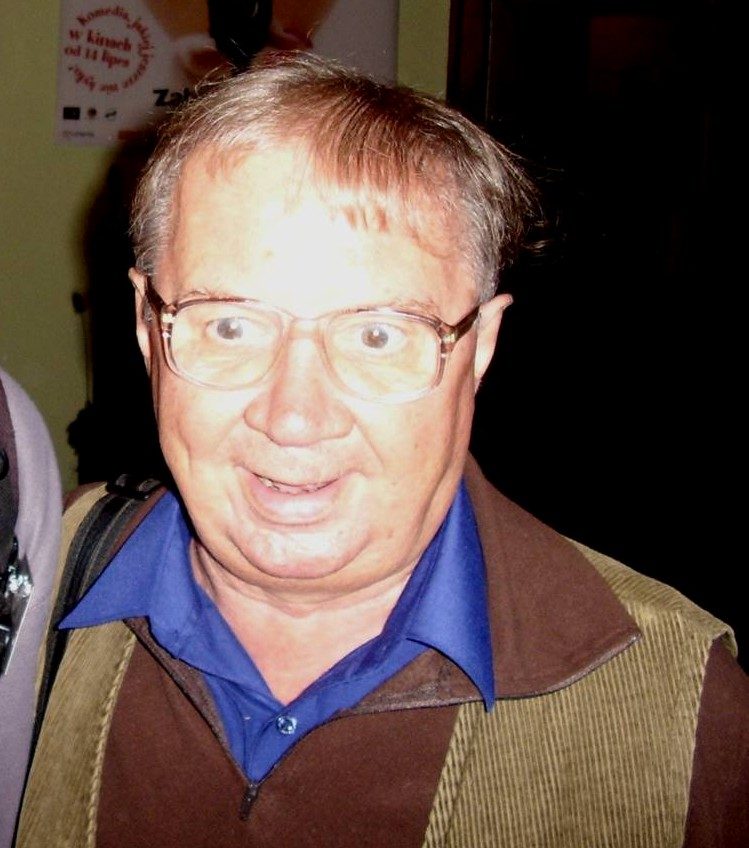
Roman Kłosowski in 2006

- Celuloza, by Jerzy Kawalerowicz (1953)
- Człowiek na torze, by A. Munk (1956)
- Cień, by Jerzy Kawalerowicz (1956)
- Eroica, by A. Munk (1957)
- Ewa chce spać, by T. Chmielewski (1958)
- Baza ludzi umarłych, by Cz. Petelski (1958)
- Pętla a.k.a. The Noose, by Wojciech Has (1958)
- Giuseppe w Warszawie, by S. Lenartowicz (1964)
- Pierwszy dzień wolności, by Aleksander Ford (1964)
- Three Steps on Earth (1965)
- Hydrozagadka – by Andrzej Kondratiuk
- Czterej pancerni i pies
- Czterdziestolatek, by J. Gruza, TV series (1974–1976)
- Czy jest tu panna na wydaniu, by Janusz Kondratiuk (1976)
- Wielka majówka, by K. Rogulski (1981)
- Big Bang, by Andrzej Kondratiuk (1986)
- Sonata marymoncka, by J. Ridan (1987)
- Koniec sezonu na lody, by S. Szyszko (1987)
- I Love, You Love (1989)
- Kramarz, reż. A. Barański (1990)
- Dzień wielkiej ryby, by A. Barański (1996)
- Świat według Kiepskich, by O.Khamidow
- Rób swoje ryzyko jest twoje, by M. Terlecki (2002)
- Stacyjka, TV series (2003-2004)
- Atrakcyjny pozna panią (2004)
- Niania (2005–2006) as uncle Henio
- Jeszcze nie wieczór, by Jacek Bławut (2008)
- Ojciec Mateusz (2009)

== Bibliography ==
- Witold Filler, Lech Piotrowski, Poczet aktorów polskich. Od Solskiego do Lindy, wyd. Philip Wilson, Warszawa 1998.
