= KADR (studio) =

Polish film production and distribution company

- Trade name: Studio Filmowe KADR
- Type: Subsidiary
- Industry: Film and media
- Predecessor: Zespoły Filmowe
- Founded: May 1, 1955; 71 years ago
- Founder: Jerzy Kawalerowicz
- Headquarters: Warsaw, Poland
- Total assets: 36 (2010)
- Owner: Warsaw Documentary Film Studio
- Parent: Documentary and Feature Film Studios (2019-present)

KADR (since 1989, doing business as Studio Filmowe Kadr) is a major Polish film production and distribution company, founded in 1955 and still producing films as of 2016. Between its founding and 2003, KADR released 150 films in total, including many classics of Polish cinema.

== History ==
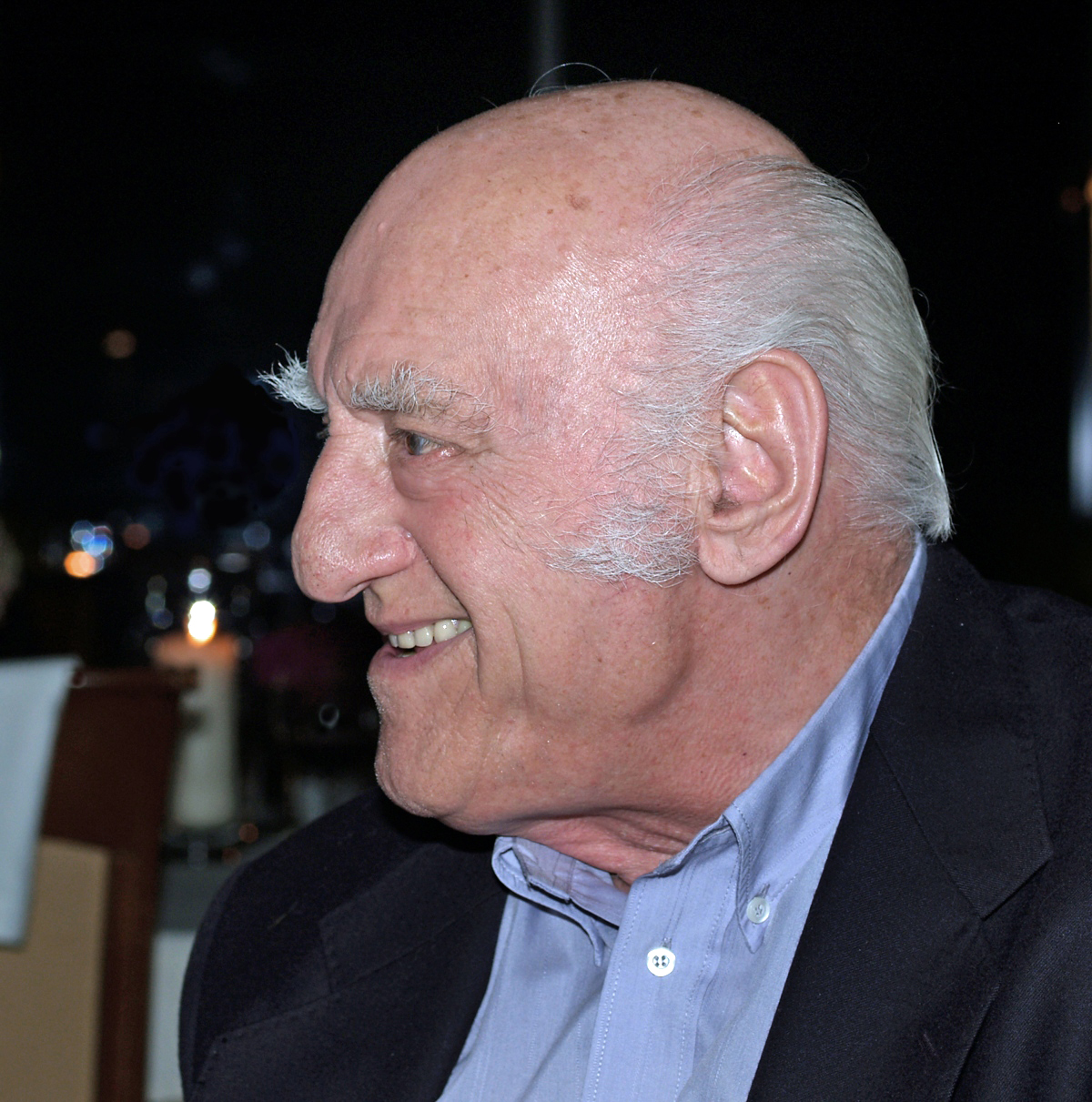
Kadr founder Jerzy Kawalerowicz

"Arguably the most important Polish film studio," Kadr was founded on May 1, 1955, by filmmaker Jerzy Kawalerowicz, and its initial output is closely associated with him. Along with Krzysztof Teodor Toeplitz and Tadeusz Konwicki, Kawalerowicz was a primary influence on the development of the Polish Film School in the 1950s. With a few exceptions, its landmark films were produced at Kadr.

The organization began as one of a few "film units" (zespoły filmowe) set up as state enterprises, and with close connections to the establishment National Film School in Łódź. By 1968 Kadr was a major studio, producing perhaps four titles annually, including the big-budget three-year period production of Pharaoh, nominated for an Academy Award for Best Foreign Language Film in 1967.

The studio was closed in the political turmoil of March 1968, and re-established three years later on January 1, 1972. Kawalerowicz continued as artistic director from the founding until his death in 2007.

Pursuant to the Order of the Minister of Culture and National Heritage of 3 September 2019, on 1 October 2019, the KADR studio merged with the Tor, Zebra, Studio Miniatur Filmowych studios and the "old" WFDiF, on the basis of which the new Warsaw Documentary Film Studio was established, it continues to be a label and standalone subsidiary of Documentary and Feature Film Studios.

== Films ==
Following is a partial list of films released by Kadr:

- Pokolenie (A Generation), directed by Andrzej Wajda, 1955
- Cień (Shadow), directed by Kawalerowicz, 1956
- Człowiek na torze (Man on the Tracks), directed by Andrzej Munk, 1956
- Kanał (Canal), directed by Andrzej Wajda, 1956
- Deszczowy lipiec (Rainy July), directed by Leonard Buczkowski, 1958
- Eroica, directed by Munk, 1958
- Krzyż walecznych (Cross of Valor), directed by Kazimierz Kutz, 1958
- Ostatni dzień lata (The Last Day of Summer), directed by Tadeusz Konwicki, 1958
- Popiół i diament (Ashes and Diamonds), directed by Wajda, 1958
- Lotna, directed by Wajda, 1959
- Orzeł (The Eagle), directed by Buczkowski, 1959
- Pociąg (Night Train), directed by Kawalerowicz, 1959
- Nikt nie woła, directed by Kutz, 1960
- Do widzenia, do jutra... (Goodbye Until Morning), directed by Janusz Morgenstern, 1960
- Niewinni czarodzieje (Innocent Sorcerers), directed by Wajda, 1960
- Czas przeszly (Time Past), directed by Buczkowski, 1961
- Matka Joanna od Aniołów (Mother Joan of the Angels), directed by Kawalerowicz, 1961
- Samson, directed by Wajda, 1961
- Zaduszki (All Souls' Day), directed by Konwicki, 1962
- Faraon (Pharaoh), directed by Kawalerowicz, 1965
- Salto, directed by Konwicki, 1965
- Marysia i Napoleon (Mary and Napoleon), directed by Buczkowski, 1966
- Gniazdo (The Cradle), directed by Jan Rybkowski, 1974
- Noce i dnie (Nights and Days), directed by Jerzy Antczak, 1975 (nominated for Academy Award for Best Foreign Language Film)
- Śmierć prezydenta (Death of a President), directed by Kawalerowicz, 1977
- Vabank, directed by Juliusz Machulski, 1981
- Seksmisja (Sexmission), directed by Malchulski, 1983
- Kingsajz, directed by Malchulski, 1987
- Quo Vadis, directed by Kawalerowicz, 2001
- Rewers (Reverse), directed by Borys Lankosz, 2009
- Sala Samobójców (Suicide Room), directed by Jan Komasa, 2011
- Piłsudski, directed by Michał Rosa, 2019
