= Polish Film School =

Group of Polish film directors and screenplay writers

- Years active: 1956 to 1963
- Location: Poland
- Major figures: Andrzej Wajda, Jerzy Kawalerowicz, Andrzej Munk, Tadeusz Konwicki, Wojciech Jerzy Has, Kazimierz Kutz, Stanisław Różewicz
- Influences: Italian neorealism, Expressionism, film noir
- Influenced: Czechoslovak New Wave, New Hollywood

Polish Film School (Polish: polska szkoła filmowa) refers to an informal group of Polish film directors and screenplay writers active between 1956 and approximately 1963. Among the most prominent representatives of the school are Andrzej Wajda, Andrzej Munk, and Jerzy Kawalerowicz.

== Overview ==
The group was under the heavy influence of Italian neorealists. It took advantage of the liberal changes in Poland after 1956 Polish October to portray the complexity of Polish history during World War II and German occupation. Among the most important topics were the generation of former Home Army soldiers and their role in post-war Poland and the national tragedies like the German concentration camps and the Warsaw Uprising. The political changes allowed the group to speak more openly of the recent history of Poland. However, the rule of censorship was still strong when it comes to history after 1945 and there were very few films on contemporary events. This marked the major difference between the members of the Polish Film School and Italian neorealists.

The Polish Film School was the first to underline the national character of Poles and one of the first artistic movements in Central Europe to openly oppose the official guidelines of Socialist realism. The members of the movement tend to underline the role of individual as opposed to collectivity. There were two trends within the movement: young directors such as Andrzej Wajda generally studied the idea of heroism, while another group (the most notable being Andrzej Munk) analyzed the Polish character via irony, humor, and dissection of national myths.

== Notable people and films ==
- Andrzej Wajda
  - Kanał (1956)
  - Ashes and Diamonds (Popiół i diament, 1958)
- Andrzej Munk
  - Man on the Tracks (Człowiek na torze, 1956)
  - Heroism (Eroica, 1958)
  - Bad Luck (Zezowate szczęście, 1959)
  - Passenger (Pasażerka, 1963, finished by Witold Lesiewicz)
- Jerzy Kawalerowicz
  - The Real End of the Great War (Prawdziwy koniec wielkiej wojny, 1957)
  - Night Train (Pociąg, 1959)
  - Mother Joan of the Angels (Matka Joanna od Aniołów, 1961)
- Wojciech Has
  - Farewells (Pożegnania, 1958)
  - How to Be Loved (Jak być kochaną, 1963)
- Kazimierz Kutz
  - Cross of Valor (Krzyż walecznych, 1958)
  - Nobody's Calling (Nikt nie woła, 1960)
  - The People from the Train (Ludzie z pociągu, 1961)
- Tadeusz Konwicki
  - Winter Twilight (Zimowy zmierzch, 1957)
  - The Last Day of Summer (Ostatni dzień lata, 1958)
  - All Souls' Day (Zaduszki, 1961)
- Stanisław Różewicz
  - Free City (Wolne Miasto, 1958)
  - Birth Certificate (Świadectwo urodzenia, 1961)
- Jerzy Lipman; collaborated as cinematographer with Wajda, Munk, Kawalerowicz, Hoffman and Polański

== See also ==
- Cinema of Poland
- National Film School in Łódź
- List of Polish language films
- Cinema of moral anxiety
