= List of Polish films =

List of films produced in the Cinema of Poland. For an A-Z list of films currently covered on Wikipedia see Polish films.

- List of Polish films before 1930
- List of Polish films of the 1930s
- List of Polish films of the 1940s
- List of Polish films of the 1950s
- List of Polish films of the 1960s
- List of Polish films of the 1970s
- List of Polish films of the 1980s
- List of Polish films of the 1990s
- List of Polish films of the 2000s
- List of Polish films of the 2010s
  - List of Polish films of 2014
  - List of Polish films of 2016
  - List of Polish films of 2017
- List of Polish films of the 2020s
- List of Polish war films
- List of Polish films in the interwar period

== See also ==
- List of years in Poland
- List of years in Polish television
