= Józef Kostecki =

Polish actor

Józef Kostecki (1922 - 1980) was a Polish actor. A 1948 graduate of the Theatre Academy of Warsaw, he is best known for his role of Grand Duke Vytautas in Aleksander Ford's Knights of the Teutonic Order.

Józef Kostecki was born Józef Eugeniusz Kostuch on 26 February 1922 in Kraków. In 1945 he joined the actor's school of the Old Theatre and then moved to the National Theatre School in Łódź before finally moving to Warsaw and graduating from the Theatre Academy. In the 1940s he appeared on stage of Polish Theatre in Poznań, Polish Army Theatre in Łódź and Aleksander Węgierko Theatre of Białystok before joining the Warsaw-based Teatr Współczesny (1949-1954) and then the Ateneum Theatre (1954-1972).

He was mostly cast in roles of cold, cynical and detached middle-aged gentlemen, though at times he also portrayed lovers and even comedic characters. He also appeared in numerous films, including Podhale w ogniu, Andrzej Munk's Heroism, Knights of the Teutonic Order, Ogniomistrz Kaleń and Stawka większa niż życie TV series, as well as numerous films shot for the Television Theatre, that is theatrical plays recorded for the Polish Television.

Kostecki retired in January 1973. He died 18 August 1980 in Warsaw and was buried at Wólka Węglowa cemetery of Warsaw.
