= List of Polish films of the 1970s =

List of films produced in the Cinema of Poland in the 1970s.

Title	Director	Cast	Genre	Notes
1970
The Birch Wood	Andrzej Wajda			Entered into the 7th Moscow International Film Festival
Landscape After the Battle	Andrzej Wajda	Daniel Olbrychski	Drama	Entered into the 1970 Cannes Film Festival
Salt of the Black Earth	Kazimierz Kutz			
1971
Family Life	Krzysztof Zanussi			Entered into the 1971 Cannes Film Festival
1972
The Wedding	Andrzej Wajda	Daniel Olbrychski	Drama	
Pearl in the Crown	Kazimierz Kutz			Entered into the 1972 Cannes Film Festival
1973
The Hourglass Sanatorium	Wojciech Has			Won the Jury Prize at the 1973 Cannes Film Festival
Copernicus	Ewa Petelska, Czesław Petelski			Entered into the 8th Moscow International Film Festival
1974
The Deluge	Jerzy Hoffman	Daniel Olbrychski		
A Jungle Book of Regulations				
1975
Nights and Days	Jerzy Antczak	Jadwiga Barańska		Barańska won the Silver Bear for Best Actress at Berlin
The Promised Land	Andrzej Wajda	Daniel Olbrychski		Won the Golden Prize at the 9th Moscow International Film Festival
The Story of Sin	Walerian Borowczyk			Entered into the 1975 Cannes Film Festival
A Woman's Decision	Krzysztof Zanussi			Entered into the 25th Berlin International Film Festival
Zaklęte rewiry	Janusz Majewski			Entered into the 25th Berlin International Film Festival
1976
Bezkresne laki	Wojciech Solarz			
Brunet wieczorową porą	Stanislaw Bareja		Comedy	
Con amore	Jan Batory			
Motylem jestem, czyli romans czterdziestolatka	Jerzy Gruza		Comedy	
Przepraszam, czy tu bija?	Marek Piwowski		Crime	
To Save the City	Jan Łomnicki			Entered into the 10th Moscow International Film Festival
1977
Antyki	Krzysztof Wojciechowski			
Death of a President	Jerzy Kawalerowicz			Entered into the 28th Berlin International Film Festival
Man of Marble (Czlowiek z marmuru)	Andrzej Wajda		Drama	Won the FIPRESCI Prize at the 1978 Cannes Film Festival
Milioner	Sylwester Szyszko		Drama	
Królowa pszczól	Janusz Nasfeter		Family	
Sam na sam	Andrzej Kostenko		Drama	
Za rok, za dzien, za chwile...	Stanislaw Lenartowicz			
Zdjecia próbne	Jerzy Domaradzki		Drama	
1978
Spiral	Krzysztof Zanussi			Entered into the 1978 Cannes Film Festival
Without Anesthesia	Andrzej Wajda			Entered into the 1979 Cannes Film Festival
1979
Camera Buff	Krzysztof Kieślowski			Won the Golden Prize at the 11th Moscow International Film Festival
