= List of Polish-language films =

Polish language films include:

== Alphabetical by Polish title ==
- Austeria
- Bilans kwartalny
- Brat
- Człowiek na torze
- Człowiek z Marmuru
- Człowiek z Żelaza
- Cztery noce z Anną
- Dekalog
- Dług
- Dreszcze
- Eroica
- Faraon
- Gdzie woda czysta i trawa zielona
- Głosy
- Golem
- Jak być kochaną
- Kanał
- Katastrofa w Gibraltarze
- Kingsajz
- Klincz
- Lotna
- Miś
- Nóż w wodzie
- LARP. Miłość, trolle i inne questy
- Ogniem i Mieczem
- Ostatni dzień lata
- Pan Wołodyjowski
- Pasażerka
- Pianista
- Pociąg
- Pokolenie
- Popiół i Diament
- Potop
- Pożegnania
- Pręgi
- Przez dotyk
- Quo Vadis
- Rejs
- Rękopis znaleziony w Saragossie
- Rysopis
- Sanatorium Pod Klepsydrą
- Seksmisja
- Słoń
- Tatarak
- Trzeba zabić tę miłość
- Trzy Kolory: Bialy
- Walkower
- Zemsta
- Zamach stanu
- Ziemia Obiecana, two films
- Życie dla początkujących

== Alphabetical by title of English release ==
- Ashes and Diamonds
- Austeria
- Blind Chance
- By Touch
- Camera Buff
- Colonel Wolodyjowski
- The Cruise
- The Debt
- Dekalog
- The Deluge
- The Double Life of Véronique
- Farewells
- A Generation
- Heroism
- The Hourglass Sanatorium
- How to Be Loved
- Kanal
- Knife in the Water
- Korczak
- The Last Day of Summer
- Lotna
- Man of Iron
- Man of Marble
- Man on the Tracks
- Mother Joan of the Angels
- Night Train
- No End
- The Passenger
- Pharaoh
- The Pianist
- The Promised Land
- The Real End of the Great War
- The Revenge
- The Saragossa Manuscript
- Sexmission
- Shadow
- A Short Film About Killing
- A Short Film About Love
- Teddy Bear
- Three Colors: White
- A Woman's Decision

== See also ==
- List of Polish films
- Polish film school
