= Helena Dąbrowska =

Polish actress (1923–2003)

- Born: 26 June 1923; Białobrzegi, Poland
- Died: 31 May 2003 (aged 79); Warsaw, Poland
- Occupation: Actress
- Years active: 1954–1981

Helena Dąbrowska (26 June 1923 – 31 May 2003) was a Polish actress. She appeared in more than twenty films and television shows between 1954 and 1981.

== Filmography ==
Year	Title	Role	Notes
1954	Trudna milosc		
1957	Trzy kobiety		
1957	The Real End of the Great War		
1959	Night Train	Train Controller	
1960	Bad Luck	Wychówna	
1961	Husband of His Wife	Neighbour	Uncredited
1962	Glos z tamtego swiata	Florist	
1963	Black Wings	Knote	
1964	Rozwodów nie bedzie	Florist	(episode 1)
1964	Ubranie prawie nowe		
1964	Spotkanie ze szpiegiem	Agent	
1964	Przerwany lot	Mother	
1964	Pięciu	Rysiek's Mother Helga	
1965	Three Steps on Earth	Tenant	(segment "Rozwód po Polsku")
1968	Dancing w kwaterze Hitlera		
1970	Maly	Grocholska	Uncredited
1972	Szklana kula	Aga's mother	
1980	Urodziny mlodego warszawiaka	Woman in the Moonshine Kiosk	
