= Tadeusz Łomnicki =

Polish actor

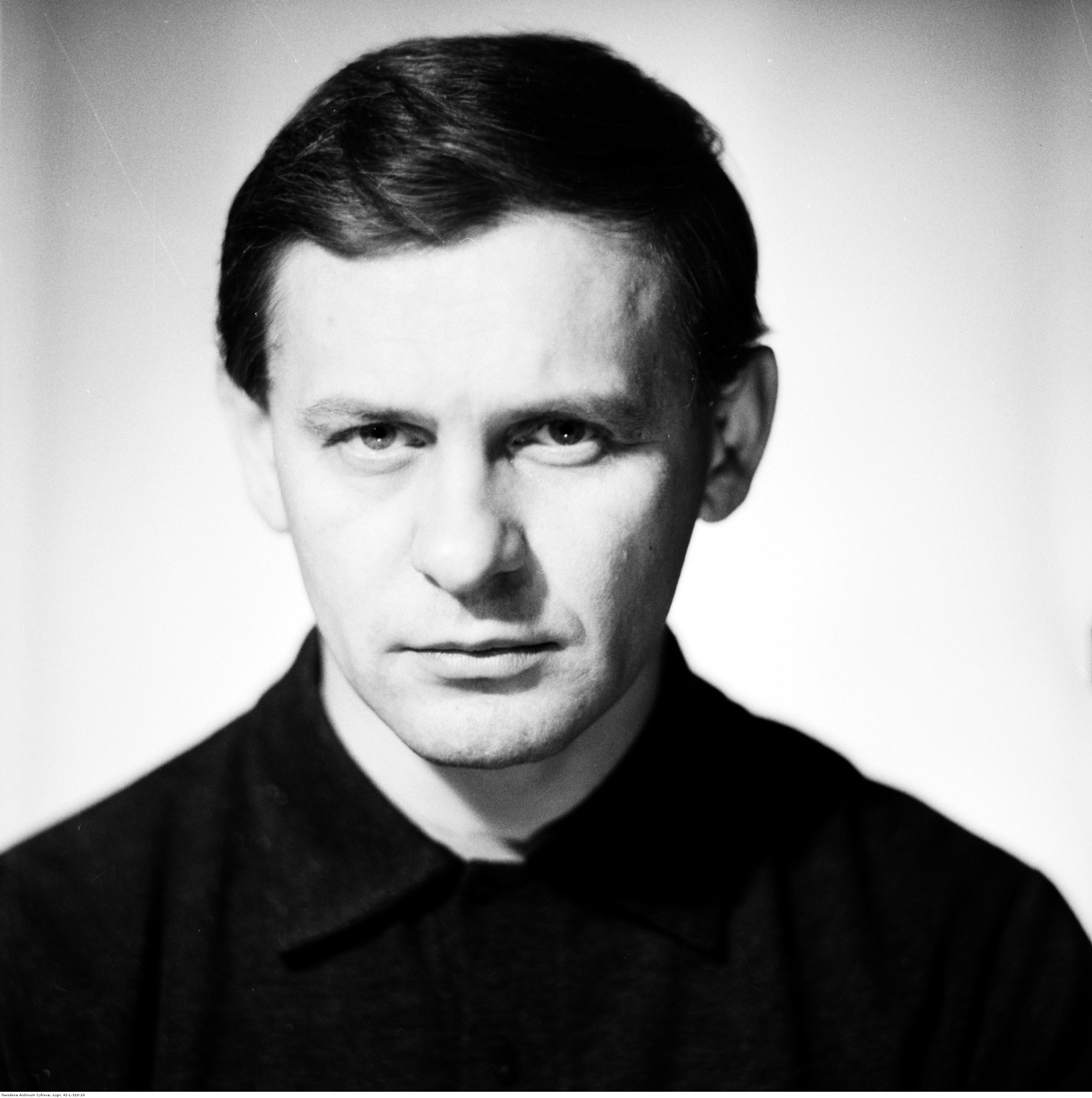
- Born: 18 July 1927; Podhajce, Poland (now Pidhaitsi, Ukraine)
- Died: 22 February 1992 (aged 64); Poznań, Poland
- Occupation: Actor
- Political party: Polish United Workers' Party (resigned in 1981)

Tadeusz Łomnicki (Polish pronunciation: [taˈdɛ.uʂ wɔmˈɲit͡skʲi]; 18 July 1927 – 22 February 1992) was a Polish actor, one of the most notable stage and film artists of his time in Poland. He is remembered mostly for his roles in comedies and dramas, as well as for the role of Kordian in Juliusz Słowacki's play of the same title. He was also a notable professor and a rector of the State Theatre School in Warsaw.

== Biography ==
He was born on 18 July 1927 in Podhajce near Lwów in the Second Polish Republic to a family of a post office clerk and a teacher. After graduating from a trade school in Dębica he moved to Kraków, where he started to work as railway worker and study violin play. There he spent World War II and fought against the Germans in the ranks of the Grey Ranks. In 1945 he passed his exams to an actors' school organized by the Stary Teatr (Old Theatre), one of the most prestigious Polish theatres of the epoch. After his stage debut in an episodic role in Stary Teatr he briefly appeared in Słowacki's theatre in Kraków and the Municipal Theatre in Katowice. For his role of Puck in William Shakespeare's A Midsummer Night's Dream he received an award of the Shakespeare Festival in Warsaw.

Finally in 1949 he moved to Warsaw, where he became a member of Teatr Współczesny, one of the best Polish stages at the time, led by renowned director Erwin Axer. About that time he also debuted as a playwright, with two of his plays staged in Kielce and Kraków. He was also engaged in the National Theatre in the role of Kordian in Juliusz Słowacki's play of the same title, which gained him much popularity and fame. He was also admitted to the National Theatre Academy (Akademia Teatralna) in Warsaw and graduated from the Directors' Division in 1956. In 1955 he played the first major role in a film appearing in Andrzej Wajda's A Generation. This film, undoubtedly the first major production of Wajda, led to ever-increasing popularity of Łomnicki, who started to be regarded as one of the most notable actors of the so-called Polish Film School. The following years he also appeared in most major films screened by the Polish Film School movement members, among them in Wajda's Innocent Sorcerers (1960), Heroism by Andrzej Munk (1958) and Depot of the Dead by Czesław Petelski. In 1969 he appeared in his most famous films, the Colonel Wolodyjowski and The Deluge by Jerzy Hoffman, the latter being nominated for the Best Foreign Film Oscar in 1974. He also won the award for Best Actor at the 6th Moscow International Film Festival.

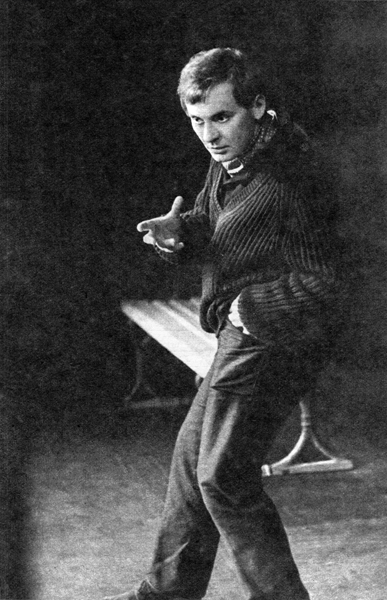
Tadeusz Łomnicki in 1966

He continued to play in Teatr Współczesny until 1974, and gained much fame for his lead roles in Iphigenia in Paris, Bertolt Brecht's The Resistible Rise of Arturo Ui, Aleksander Fredro's The Annuity, the role of Edgar in Friedrich Dürrenmatt's Play Strindberg and the role of Nikita in Lev Tolstoy's The Power of Darkness. Between 1970 and 1981 he was also the rector of his alma mater in Warsaw. During his work there he modified the actor's studio by introducing new lectures, mostly designed to fit the new role of the actors in television and films. About that time he also became the founder and the first head of his own theatre, the Warsaw-based Teatr na Woli. There he appeared in a number of plays, including in the roles of Goya in Antonio Buero Vallejo's The Sleep of Reason, the lead role in Słowacki's Fantazy and the role of Salieri in Peter Shaffer's Amadeus. He also appeared in numerous films, among them Krzysztof Kieślowski's Blind Chance, Krzysztof Zanussi's The Contract and Andrzej Wajda's Man of Marble.

However, with time Łomnicki's popularity began to fade. This was due partially to his involvement with the Polish United Workers' Party, of which he was an active member. Although on the imposition of Martial Law in Poland in 1981 he resigned all his posts and party membership, his reputation never recovered. In addition, during the 1980s, he suffered from serious health problems and he appeared only in episodic roles in almost all of Warsaw-based theatres. Finally he was offered the lead role in Shakespeare's King Lear. What he considered his most important role was highly anticipated by the critics. The opening night was scheduled for the 29 February 1992. However, a week before, on 22 February, Łomnicki died suddenly of a heart attack during one of the last dress rehearsals on the stage of Poznań-based Teatr Nowy. His last words were King Lear's line: Then there's life in't. Nay, if you get it, you shall get it with running. Sa, sa, sa, sa.

== Bibliography ==
- Witold Filler, Tadeusz Łomnicki, Wydawnictwo Artystyczne i Filmowe, Seria Wydawnicza: Głowy Wawelskie, Warszawa 1976.
- Tadeusz Łomnicki, wybór i oprac. Maria Bojarska, Spotkania teatralne, 1984, ISBN 978-83-06-01131-9
- Maria Bojarska, Król Lear nie żyje, 1994, ISBN 978-83-901178-7-4
