= Jerzy Lipman =

Polish cinematographer (1922–1983)

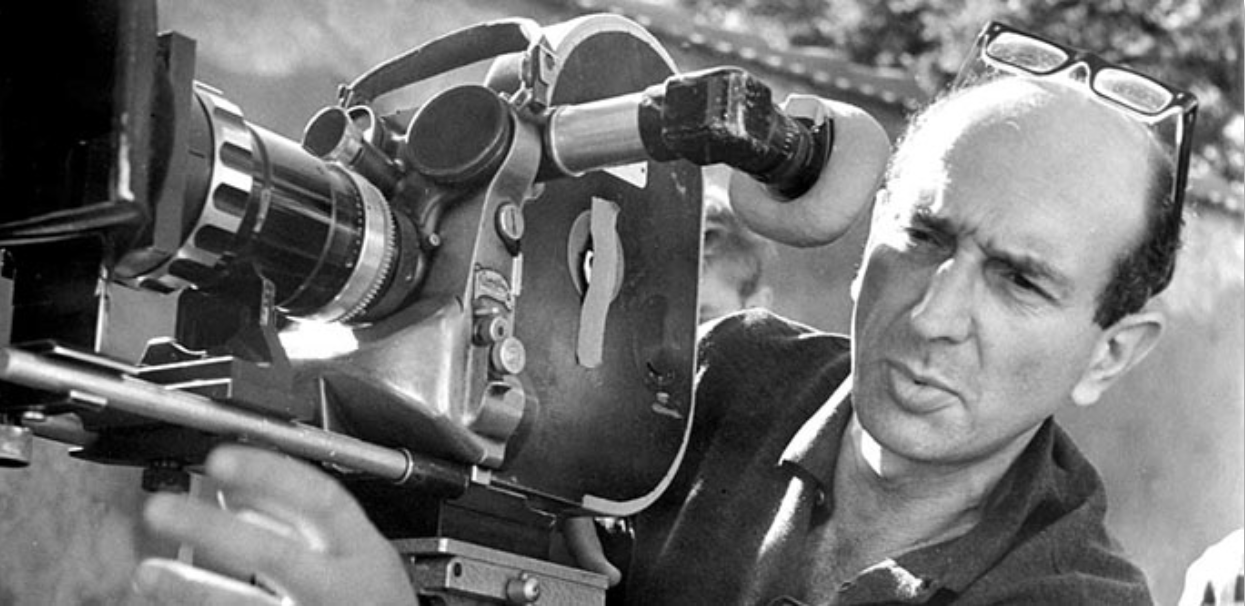
- Jerzy Lipman, c. 1950
- Born: 10 April 1922; Brest
- Died: 11 November 1983 (aged 61); London
- Citizenship: Polish
- Education: Łódź Film School
- Occupation: Cinematographer

Jerzy Lipman (10 April 1922 – 11 November 1983) was a cinematographer.

== Biography ==
He was born into a Jewish family; the son of Jakub Lipman (1875–1963), director of glassworks in Wołomin; and Maria Lipman (1880–1956), pianist and teacher of music. He had sisters Irena (1907–1942) and Zofia (1914–1944).

During the Nazi occupation, he worked as locksmith's assistant in the Wołomin's ghetto. He was a soldier in the People's Army and a prisoner of a concentration camp. In 1952 he graduated in cinematography from the Łódź Film School (he obtained diploma in 1965). He co-created Polish Film School. On several occasions, he collaborated with his younger colleague, Jerzy Wójcik. In 1969, in an aftermath of the March 1968 events, he emigrated from Poland with his family. In 1971 he was refused the right to move back to Poland. He remained in the Western Bloc; while he lived in London, he worked in West Germany. He taught at the Munich Film School.

== Filmography ==
- Jacek, a part of Three Stories (1953)
- A Generation (1954)
- Shadow (1956)
- Kanał (1956)
- The Real End of the Great War (1957)
- Zamach (1959)
- Lotna (1959)
- Bad Luck (1960)
- Knife in the Water (1961)
- Ambulans (1961; short film)
- Gangsterzy i filantropi (1962)
- Warszawa, a segment of Love at Twenty (1962)
- Zbrodniarz i panna (1963)
- Rozwodów nie będzie (1963)
- Prawo i pięść (1964)
- The Ashes (1965)
- Sposób bycia (1965)
- Zosia (1967)
- Ojciec (1967; short film)
- Pan Wołodyjowski (1969)
- Dzień oczyszczenia (1969)
- Das falsche Gewicht (1971)
- Tears of Blood (1972)
- Sie sind frei, dr. Korczak (1974)
- Dead Pigeon on Beethoven Street (1975)
- Amor (1977)

Source.

== Awards ==
- Knight's Cross of the Order of Polonia Restituta (1959)

== Bibliography ==
- Tadeusz Lubelski, ed. (2005). Zdjęcia: Jerzy Lipman. Warszawa.
