= Pharaoh (film) =

- Publicity still
- Directed by: Jerzy Kawalerowicz
- Written by: Jerzy Kawalerowicz; Tadeusz Konwicki; Bolesław Prus
- Starring: Jerzy Zelnik; Wiesława Mazurkiewicz; Barbara Brylska; Krystyna Mikołajewska
- Cinematography: Jerzy Wójcik
- Edited by: Wiesława Otocka
- Music by: Adam Walaciński
- Release date: 11 March 1966
- Running time: 145 minutes
- Country: Poland
- Language: Polish
- Box office: 7 million tickets

Pharaoh (Polish: Faraon) is a 1966 epic Polish film directed by Jerzy Kawalerowicz and adapted from the eponymous novel by the Polish writer Bolesław Prus. In 1967, it was nominated for an Academy Award for Best Foreign Language Film. It was also entered into the 1966 Cannes Film Festival. It sold more than 7 million tickets in Poland, becoming one of the highest-grossing Polish films of all time. Pharaoh is among 21 digitally restored classic Polish films chosen for Martin Scorsese Presents: Masterpieces of Polish Cinema.

== Novel ==
Pharaoh (Polish: Faraon) is the fourth and last major novel by the Polish writer Bolesław Prus (1847–1912). Composed over a year's time in 1894–95, serialized in 1895–96, and published in book form in 1897, it was the author's sole historical novel.

Jerzy Kawalerowicz, who had previously directed such films as Cellulose (1953), Under the Phrygian Star (1954), The Shade (1956), The Real End of the Great War (1957), Night Train (1959) and Mother Joan of the Angels (1961), turned in the 1960s to Bolesław Prus' novel Pharaoh because, he said, "There are brilliant things in it.... The drama of power in Pharaoh is incredibly topical and contemporary. The mechanics don't change all that much."

Kawalerowicz's co-author of the scenario, Tadeusz Konwicki, commented: "It's not a historical novel in the full sense of the word, it's above all a penetrating analysis of a system of power.... The story of Ramses XIII is a typical example of the actions of a young person who enters upon life with a faith and need for renewal. He does not yet know anything about higher reasons of state, he has no interest in the laws governing the complex apparatus of power. It seems to him that he is the person to change the existing order of things."

== Film ==
Pharaoh's production took three years, beginning in the fall of 1962 with the setting up of a studio in Łódź which did in-depth studies of the costumes and realia of life in ancient Egypt. Filming took place in Europe, Asia and Africa. Most of the indoor scenes of the pharaoh's palace, the temples and the Labyrinth were shot at the Łódź studio. The Warsaw River Shipyard built an Egyptian ship according to drawings from 4,000 years ago. An artificial island was created on Lake Kirsajty, near Giżycko, Poland, and planted with palms and lotus for the scene involving Ramses' row on the Nile with Sara.

Mass scenes were filmed mainly in the Soviet Union, in the Uzbek SSR's part of the Kyzyl Kum Desert (now Uzbekistan). The crew spent nearly five months there, working in very difficult conditions—at the height of summer, the noon temperature exceeded 50 degrees Celsius (122 Fahrenheit); the temperature of the sand, 80 degrees Celsius (176 Fahrenheit). Film stock had to be kept in cold storage. A very vexatious thing was the ubiquitous dust. Every day, 10,000 bottles of mineral water were delivered to the shooting location. Hazards included sand vipers and venomous spiders that launched themselves at people from a couple of yards' distance.

Some scenes were filmed at authentic Egyptian locales. For example, the scene in which Prince Ramses learns that his father Pharaoh Ramses XII has died and that he has now become Pharaoh Ramses XIII, takes place against the backdrop of the pyramids of Giza; but the crowds of tourists and the present-day appearance of the area made it near-impossible to find good takes. One of the many consultants on the film was Poland's Professor Kazimierz Michałowski, a world authority in Egyptology. Another was Shadi Abdel Salam, an Egyptian film director and costume designer, who had consulted on the 1963 Cleopatra. Abdel Salam was the costume designer for Pharaoh.

In adapting Bolesław Prus' novel to the screen, the film's producers made a number of notable decisions. One was to keep the film in a predominantly golden-yellowish register and to almost eliminate bright colors; bright foliage appears only once—in the scene with Ramses and Sara on the Nile. During the military maneuvers that open the film, an incident has been introduced that does not appear in the novel, involving the wrangling down of a horse. Near the movie's end, High Priest Mefres is dispatched by the Keepers of the Labyrinth not with a chloroform-like substance, but with a rope looped around his neck and pulled tight by its ends, several yards apart. Pharaoh is among 21 digitally restored classic Polish films chosen for Martin Scorsese Presents: Masterpieces of Polish Cinema.

== Plot ==
The young pharaoh, Ramesses XIII, intends to reform Ancient Egypt. Herhor the priest opposes him. The power struggle between them is the focus of the film. Other themes include the friendship with Pentuer the priest, the love for Sara the beautiful Jewess and Kama the priestess. It is also the story of the secret pact with Assyria, the Solar eclipse and how the priests used it to subdue the crowds, and the assassination of Ramses XIII at the hands of his look-alike. A historical fresco of universal meaning, revealing the mechanisms of power and the influence of religion on social life.

== Cast ==
- Ramses XIII; and his look-alike, Lykon: Jerzy Zelnik
- Herhor (High Priest of Amon): Piotr Pawłowski
- Pentuer (priest, Herhor's assistant): Leszek Herdegen
- Thutmose (Ramses XIII's cousin): Emir Buczacki
- Ennana (Egyptian army officer): Ryszard Ronczewski
- Fellah: Jerzy Block
- Sara (Ramses XIII's Jewish mistress, mother of his son Seti): Krystyna Mikołajewska
- Ramses XII (father of Ramses XIII): Andrzej Girtler
- Nitager (Egyptian general): Wiktor Grotowicz
- Queen Nikotris (mother of Ramses XIII): Wiesława Mazurkiewicz
- Berossus (Chaldean priest): Kazimierz Opaliński
- Mefres (Egyptian high priest): Stanisław Milski
- Mentezufis (Egyptian priest): Józef Czerniawski
- Dagon (Phoenician merchant): Edward Rączkowski
- Rabsun (Phoenician merchant): Marian Nosek
- Hiram (Tyrian prince): Alfred Łodziński
- Kama (Phoenician priestess): Barbara Brylska
- Sargon (Assyrian envoy): Jarosław Skulski
- Tehenna (Libyan commander): Leonard Andrzejewski
- Priestess at mummification of Ramses XII: Lucyna Winnicka
- Keeper of the Labyrinth: Bohdan Janiszewski
- Samentu (High Priest of Set): Mieczysław Voit
- Hebron (Ramses XIII's last mistress): Ewa Krzyżewska
- Other principal actors: Bronisław Dardziński, Jerzy Fidler, Jerzy Kozłowski

== See also ==
- List of actors who have played multiple roles in the same film
- List of historical drama films
- List of Polish submissions for the Academy Award for Best Foreign Language Film
- List of submissions to the 39th Academy Awards for Best Foreign Language Film
- National Film School in Łódź
- Pharaoh (the novel)
