= Jerzy Stefan Stawiński =

Polish screenwriter (1921–2010)

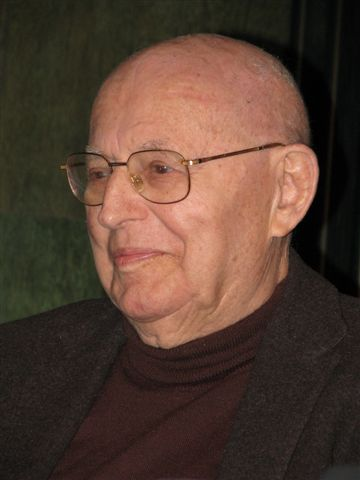
- Stawiński in 2009
- Born: 1 July 1921; Zakręt, Poland
- Died: 12 June 2010 (aged 88); Warsaw, Poland
- Occupations: Screenwriter; Film director
- Years active: 1957–2010

Jerzy Stefan Stawiński (1 July 1921 – 12 June 2010) was a Polish screenwriter and film director. Beginning in 1957 he had written or co-written 29 films. He wrote a segment of the film Love at Twenty, which was entered into the 12th Berlin International Film Festival.

== Biography ==
He grew up in the Żoliborz district of Warsaw. When World War II broke out, Stawiński fought in the Polish Army. In 1940 he joined the partisans and in 1944 he fought in the Warsaw Uprising. He was eventually incarcerated in Oflag VII-A Murnau. After being liberated Stawiński volunteered for the Polish Army in the West and served in Italy in II Corps of Gen. Władysław Anders. He returned to Poland in 1947.

== Selected filmography ==
- Man on the Tracks (1956)
- Kanał (1957)
- Heroism (1958)
- Bad Luck (1960)
- Love at Twenty (1962)
- Andremo in città (1966)
- Jutro idziemy do kina (2007)

== Honours and awards ==
- 2010: Eagle Polish Film Award for Lifetime Achievement
- 2006: Gold medal Gloria Artis
- 2005: Honorary Award of the Pen Master for lifetime achievement at the Summer Film in Torun
- 1981: Cultural Activist of Merit Badge
- 1979 Golden Grape Award on Nov LLF in Lagow scenopisarski for their creative contributions to the achievements of Polish film school
- 1979: Prize of the City of Warsaw
- 1977: Award of the Ministry of Culture and Art
- 1975: Commander's Cross of the Order of Polonia Restituta
- 1963: Officer's Cross of the Order of Polonia Restituta
- 1959: Knight's Cross of the Order of Polonia Restituta
- 1943: Bronze Cross of Merit with Swords
- 1939: Cross of Valour
