= Zygmunt Kęstowicz =

Polish actor

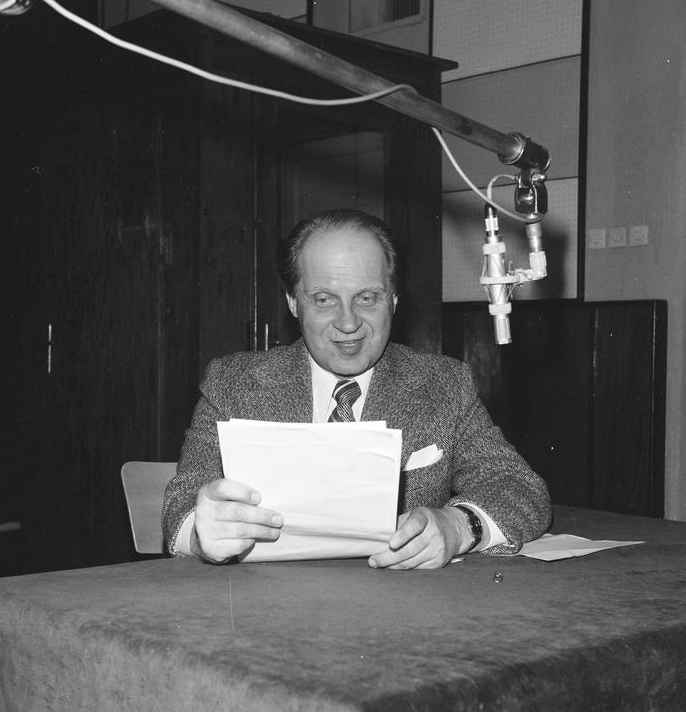
- Born: 24 January 1921; Šakiai, Lithuania
- Died: 14 March 2007 (aged 86); Warsaw, Poland
- Occupation: Actor
- Years active: 1954-1997

Zygmunt Kęstowicz (24 January 1921 – 14 March 2007) was a Polish actor. He appeared in more than 25 films and television shows between 1954 and 1997.

== Selected filmography ==
- Shadow (1956)
- Stawka większa niż życie (1967)
- Klan soap opera playing Władysław Lubicz
