= Black Wings (film) =

1963 Polish film

- Directed by: Ewa Petelska; Czesław Petelski
- Written by: Juliusz Kaden-Bandrowski; Aleksander Ścibor-Rylski; Ewa Petelska; Czesław Petelski
- Starring: Kazimierz Opaliński
- Cinematography: Kurt Weber
- Release date: 26 April 1963
- Running time: 105 minutes
- Country: Poland
- Language: Polish

Black Wings (Polish: Czarne skrzydła) is a 1963 Polish drama film directed by Ewa Petelska and Czesław Petelski. It was entered into the 3rd Moscow International Film Festival where it won a Silver Prize.

== Cast ==
- Kazimierz Opaliński as Kostryń, manager of ' Erazm'
- Czesław Wołłejko as Coeur, manager
- Zdzisław Karczewski as Antoni Mieniewski, poseł
- Stanisław Niwiński as Tadeusz Miniewski
- Maria Homerska as Kostryniowa
- Beata Tyszkiewicz as Zuza Kostryniowa
- Tadeusz Fijewski as Falkiewicz, geometra
- Wojciech Siemion as Jan Duś
- Zbigniew Koczanowicz as Martyzel
- Józef Łodyński as Koza, trade-union secretary
- Helena Dąbrowska as Knote
- Edward Wichura as Por. Kapuścik, police commandant
- Stefan Bartik as Supernak
- Bohdana Majda as Miniewska, Antoni's wife
- Michał Leśniak as a miner
