= Edward Dziewoński =

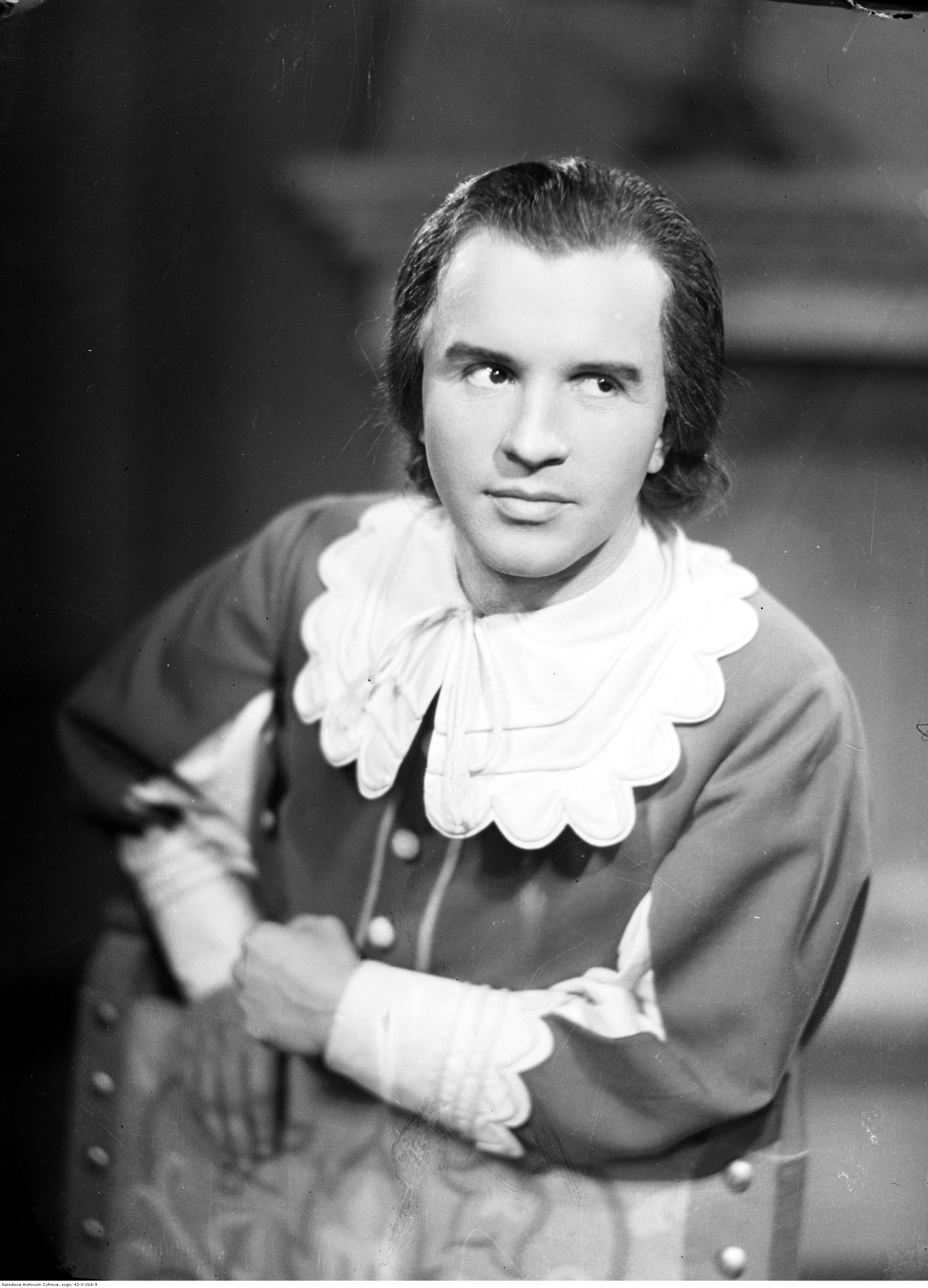
- Edward Dziewoński, 1950
- Born: December 16, 1916; Moscow, Russian Empire
- Died: August 17, 2002 (aged 85); Warsaw, Poland
- Education: Państwowy Instytut Sztuki Teatralnej
- Occupation: actor
- Years active: 1945–1994
- Spouse: Irena Wilczyńska

Edward Dziewoński (16 December 1916 in Moscow, Russian Empire – 17 August 2002 in Warsaw, Poland) was a Polish stage and film actor, and theatre director.

He studied acting at National Institute of Theatre Arts and debuted at the Syrena Theatre. He later played in the National Theatre, the Ateneum Theatre, the Współczesny Theatre, and the Komedia Theatre - and was founder and director of the Kwadrat Theatre. He was also a popular artist at satirical theatres (cabarets) such as: Kabaret Szpak, Kabaret Wagabunda, Kabaret Starszych Panów, and the one he founded and directed at - Kabaret Dudek.

== Selected filmography ==
- Ostatni etap (1948)
- Dom na pustkowiu (1949)
- Przygoda na Mariensztacie (1953)
- A Matter to Settle (1953)
- Nikodem Dyzma (1956)
- Eroica (1958)
- Zezowate szczęście (1960)
- Jutro premiera (1962)
- Żona dla Australijczyka (1963)
- Dolina Issy (1982)
- Straszny sen Dzidziusia Górkiewicza (1993)
