= Wojciech Siemion =

Polish stage and film actor (1928–2010)

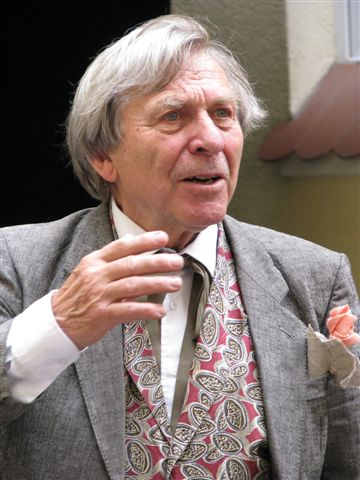
- Wojciech Siemion in 2008
- Born: Wojciech Juliusz Siemion; 30 July 1928; Krzczonów, Lublin Voivodeship, Poland
- Died: 24 April 2010 (aged 81); Warsaw, Poland
- Occupation: Actor
- Years active: 1952–2009

Wojciech Juliusz Siemion (30 July 1928 – 24 April 2010) was a Polish stage and film actor. He studied law at the Catholic University in Lublin from 1947 to 1950. At the same time, he attended acting classes at a local theatre. He enrolled at the State Theatre Academy in Warsaw and after just one month, was able to skip two years of studies. Upon graduation in 1951 he began acting in several theatres and cabarets including Pod Egidą. In 1983, he became a member of the council of the Patriotic Movement for National Rebirth, and in 1985–1989 served as a member of the Sejm from the Polish United Workers' Party. After the fall of the communist regime in Poland, Siemion became a member of the Polish People's Party and served in the regional legislature of the Masovian Voivodeship. Siemion was awarded many cultural and state awards, including the Order of Polonia Restituta.

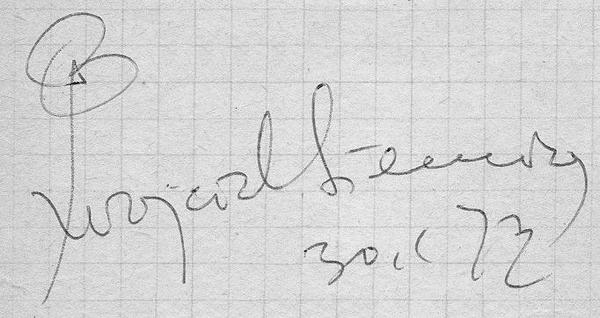
Autograph and a flower (January 1973)

On 21 April 2010, Siemion was seriously injured in a car accident in Ruszki near Sochaczew. He died three days later in a hospital in Warsaw. He was buried at the Powązki Cemetery in Warsaw.

== Filmography ==
- Eroica (1958)
- Zamach (1958)
- Zezowate szczęście (1960)
- Marysia i krasnoludki (1960)
- Black Wings (1963)
- Giuseppe w Warszawie (1964)
- Salto (1964)
- Wojna domowa (1965–1966)
- Czterej pancerni i pies ([1966–1970)
- Niewiarygodne przygody Marka Piegusa (1966)
- Kierunek Berlin (1968)
- Poszukiwany, poszukiwana (1972)
- Nie ma róży bez ognia (1974)
- Zwycięstwo (1974)
- Wolna sobota (1974)
- Ziemia obiecana (1975)
- Co mi zrobisz, jak mnie złapiesz? (1978)
- Filip z konopi (1981)
- Alternatywy 4 (1983)
- Kolejność uczuć (1993)
- Tajemnica trzynastego wagonu (1993)
- Złotopolscy (1997)
- Przedwiośnie (2001)
- Ubu Król (2003)
- Niezawodny system (2008)
- Ostatnia akcja (2009)

== Honours and awards ==
- Commander's Cross with Star of the Order of Polonia Restituta (2000; previously awarded the Commander's Cross (1989) and the Knight's Cross (1959))
- Order of the Banner of Work, Classes I (1984) and II (1962)
- Silver Cross of Merit (1956)
- Medal of the 10th-Anniversary of People's Poland (1955)
- Medal of the 30th-Anniversary of People's Poland (1975)
- Golden Honorary Emblem of the Polonia Society (1987)
- Badge of Merit in Culture (1984)
- Badge of Honour of the City of Warsaw (1977)
- Medal of the 100th anniversary of the liberation of Bulgaria (1978)
