= The High Wall =

- Directed by: Karel Kachyňa
- Written by: Jan Procházka; Karel Kachyňa
- Starring: Radka Dulíková; Vít Olmer; Helena Kružíková
- Cinematography: Josef Vaniš
- Edited by: Jan Chaloupek
- Music by: Jan Novák
- Distributed by: Ústřední půjčovna filmů
- Release date: 19 June 1964
- Running time: 69 minutes
- Country: Czechoslovakia
- Language: Czech

The High Wall (Czech: Vysoká zeď) is a 1964 Czech drama directed by Karel Kachyňa from a screenplay by Jan Procházka. The film was awarded Silver Sail at Locarno Film Festival in 1964.

== Plot ==
13-year-old girl Jitka wanders around Prague. She discovers a hospital garden behind high wall, where a young man on the wheelchair is recovering from his injuries.

== Cast ==
- Radka Dulíková as Jitka
- Vít Olmer as Young man in a wheelchair
- Helena Kružíková as Jitka's mother
- Václav Lohniský as Janitor
- Ivana Bílková as Nurse
- Josef Koza as Hospital attendant
- Andrea Čunderlíková as Girl
