= The Artillery Sergeant Kalen =

1961 Polish film

- Directed by: Ewa Petelska and Czesław Petelski
- Written by: Czesław Petelski
- Starring: Wiesław Gołas; Zofia Słaboszewska; Józef Kostecki; Wacław Kowalski; Janusz Kłosiński; Leon Niemczyk; Józef Łodyński
- Music by: Tadeusz Baird
- Release date: 1961
- Running time: 103 minutes
- Country: Poland
- Language: Polish

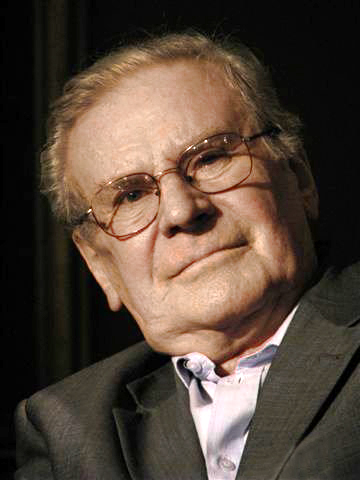

The Artillery Sergeant Kalen (Polish: Ogniomistrz Kaleń) is a Polish war movie released in 1961. The movie was directed by Ewa Petelska and Czesław Petelski. The movie is about the fate of Polish soldier named Kaleń (acted by Wiesław Gołas) who fought with UPA in 1945.
