= Helena Kružíková =

Czech actress (1928–2021)

- Born: 17 November 1928; Třebíč, First Czechoslovak Republic
- Died: 3 March 2021 (aged 92)
- Occupation: Actress

Helena Kružíková (17 November 1928 – 3 March 2021) was a Czech theater, film and TV actress.

== Biography ==
After two years at the Brno Conservatory, Kružíková transferred to the newly established Janáček Academy of Music and Performing Arts, where she graduated in 1950. She first acted in the Těšín Theatre and subsequently the National Theatre Brno. She was highly successful as a stage actress and often collaborated with Československý rozhlas and Czechoslovak Television. She also appeared in numerous films and achieved the Ceny Františka Filipovského for her career success in the field of dubbing in 1998. She also taught acting at the Brno Conservatory from 1974 to 1991. In 2019, she received a Thalia Award for Lifetime Achievement in Drama.

Helena Kružíková died on 3 March 2021 at the age of 92.

== Filmography ==
- Olověný chléb (1953)
- Přicházejí ze tmy (1953)
- School for Fathers (1957)
- První den mého syna (1964)
- Vysoká zeď (1964)
- Plavení hříbat (1975)
