= All Souls' Day (film) =

1962 Polish film

- Directed by: Tadeusz Konwicki
- Written by: Tadeusz Konwicki
- Starring: Edmund Fetting; Ewa Krzyzewska
- Cinematography: Kurt Weber
- Edited by: Wiesława Otocka
- Release date: 1962
- Running time: 93 min
- Language: Polish

All Souls' Day or Hallowe'en is the English title for Zaduszki, a film released in 1962, directed by the Polish film director Tadeusz Konwicki.

Much like Konwicki's 1958 film The Last Day of Summer, All Souls' Day is a story of survivors and the lasting psychic damage of World War II. In both films, the director embraces his position as a film amateur, self-consciously avoiding genre conventions. Unlike his earlier effort, however, All Souls' Day is driven by more conventional plot and dialogue elements that move beyond experimental filmmaking.

The film won the Special Jury Award at the International Filmfestival Mannheim-Heidelberg in 1962.

== Plot ==
Two young lovers, Wala (Ewa Krzyzewska) and Michael (Edmund Fetting), travel to a provincial town to spend the weekend at a small hotel. Memories of the war and Wala's guilt in the wake of a previous lover's death hang in the air. While both Michael and Wala are starving for love, they cannot transcend their wartime experiences.

== See also ==
- Cinema of Poland
- List of Polish language films
