= Kwiecień =

Kwiecień (Polish pronunciation: [ˈkfjɛt͜ɕɛɲ]) is a Polish surname which means "April". Notable people with the surname include:

- Anna Kwiecień (born 1964), Polish politician
- Bartosz Kwiecień (born 1994), Polish footballer
- Konrad Kwiecień (born 1964), Polish archer
- Mariusz Kwiecień (born 1972), Polish opera singer
- Michał Kwiecień (born 1957), Polish bridge player

== See also ==
- Kwiecień (film), a 1961 Polish film
