= Shadow (1956 film) =

1956 Polish film by Jerzy Kawalerowicz

- Directed by: Jerzy Kawalerowicz
- Written by: Aleksander Ścibor-Rylski
- Starring: Zygmunt Kęstowicz; Adolf Chronicki
- Cinematography: Jerzy Lipman
- Edited by: Wiesława Otocka
- Music by: Andrzej Markowski
- Distributed by: KADR
- Release date: 1956
- Running time: 98 minutes
- Country: Poland
- Language: Polish

Shadow (Polish: Cień) is a 1956 Polish film directed by Jerzy Kawalerowicz. It was entered into the 1956 Cannes Film Festival.

== Plot ==
The plot involves a Rashōmon-like investigation into the life of a man who has been found dead after having been hurled from a train. As security agents, police and a medical examiner piece together his identity, three accounts emerge: one set during World War II, one in the immediate aftermath of the war, and one in contemporary Poland. In each account, the victim seems to have been a mysterious, ambiguous presence, of shifting loyalties and suspicious connections, who set himself against the powers that be.

Critics attacked the film for its depiction of a world rife with secret agents and hidden enemies—a favorite Stalinist theme—while the film seems, rather, to demonstrate how heroism and villainy are often matters of point of view and timing.

== Cast ==
- Zygmunt Kęstowicz as Knyszyn
- Adolf Chronicki as Karbowski
- Emil Karewicz as Jasiczka
- Ignacy Machowski as Shadow
- Tadeusz Jurasz as Mikuła
- Bolesław Płotnicki as Railwayman
- Bohdan Ejmont as Officer
- Marian Łącz as Stefan
- Zdzisław Szymański as Peasant
- Halina Przybylska as Village Woman
- Antoni Jurasz as Lt. Antoni
- Wiesław Gołas as Underground Soldier
- Barbara Połomska as Stefan's Friend
- Stanisław Mikulski as Blonde
- Roman Kłosowski as Witold

== See also ==
- Cinema of Poland
- List of Polish language films
