= Zbigniew Cybulski =

Polish actor

- Zbigniew Cybulski (1960)
- Born: 3 November 1927; Kniaże, Poland
- Died: 8 January 1967 (aged 39); Wrocław, Poland
- Other name: Zbigniew Hubert Cybulski
- Education: Ludwik Solski Academy for the Dramatic Arts
- Occupation: Actor
- Years active: 1954–1967
- Notable work: Kostek in A Generation (1954); Maciek in Ashes and Diamonds (1958)
- Partner: Elżbieta Chwalibóg (1960–1967)
- Awards: Złota Kaczka (1996)

Zbigniew Hubert Cybulski (Polish pronunciation: [ˈzbiɡɲɛf t͡sɨˈbulskʲi]; 3 November 1927 – 8 January 1967) was a Polish film and theatre actor, one of the best-known and most popular personalities of the post-World War II history of Poland.

He is known for portraying young rebels in such films as Night Train and Innocent Sorcerers. His role in Andrzej Wajda's 1958 drama film Ashes and Diamonds is widely considered to be his greatest artistic achievement. His iconic image symbolizing youthful rebellion and his tragic death have drawn comparisons to American actor James Dean.

== Life and career ==
Zbigniew Cybulski was born 3 November 1927 in a small village of Kniaże near Śniatyń, Poland (now a part of Kolomyia Raion, Ivano-Frankivsk Oblast, Ukraine). After World War II he joined the Theatre Academy in Kraków. He graduated in 1953 and moved to Gdańsk, where he made his stage debut in Leon Schiller's Wybrzeże Theatre. Also, with his friend Bogumił Kobiela, Cybulski founded a famous student theatre, the Bim-Bom. In the early 1960s, Cybulski moved to Warsaw, where he shortly joined the Kabaret Wagabunda. He also appeared on stage at the Ateneum Theatre, one of the most modern and least conservative Warsaw-based theatres of the epoch.

However, Cybulski is best remembered as a screen actor. He first appeared in a 1954 film Kariera as an extra. In 1955, he made his film debut in Andrzej Wajda’s first full-feature film A Generation. His first major role came in 1958, when he played in Kazimierz Kutz's Krzyż Walecznych. The same year he also appeared as one of the main characters in Andrzej Wajda's Ashes and Diamonds and Aleksander Ford's The Eighth Day of the Week based on a short story by Marek Hłasko. From then on Cybulski was seen as one of the most notable actors of the Polish Film School and one of the "young and wrathful", as his generation of actors were called at the time.

His most famous films, apart from Ashes and Diamonds, include Wojciech Has' The Saragossa Manuscript. He also acted in numerous television plays, including some based on works by Truman Capote, Anton Chekhov and Jerzy Andrzejewski.

Cybulski died in an accident at a Wrocław Główny railway station on 8 January 1967, on his way from the film set. As he jumped on the speeding train (as he often did), he slipped on the steps, fell under the train, and was run over. He was buried in Katowice.

== Legacy ==
Zbyszek Cybulski Award
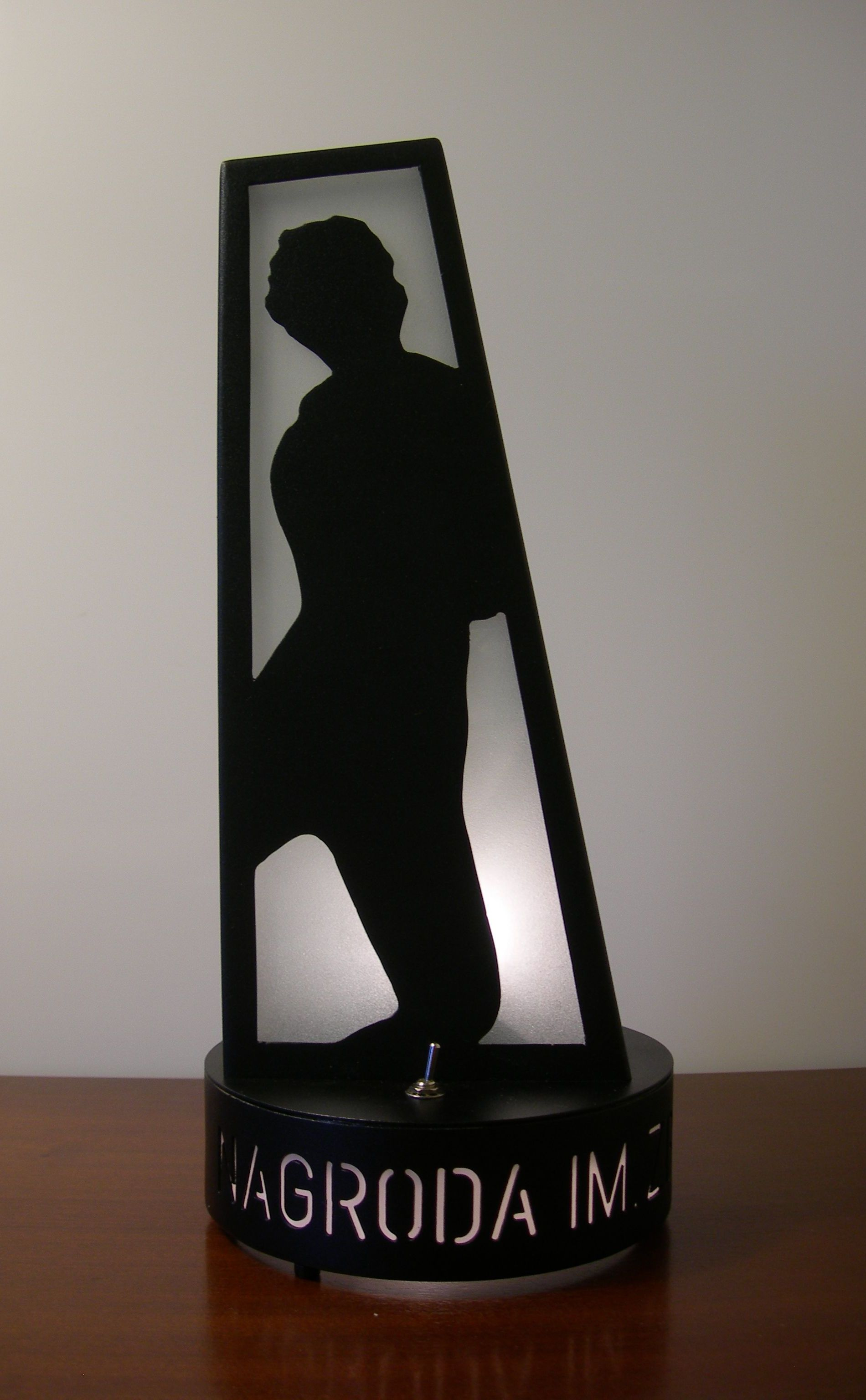
- Zbyszek Cybulski Award figurine
- Awarded for: young film actors with strong individuality
- Country: Poland
- Presented by: Film magazine
- First award: 1969; 57 years ago
- Website: www.nagrodacybulskiego.pl

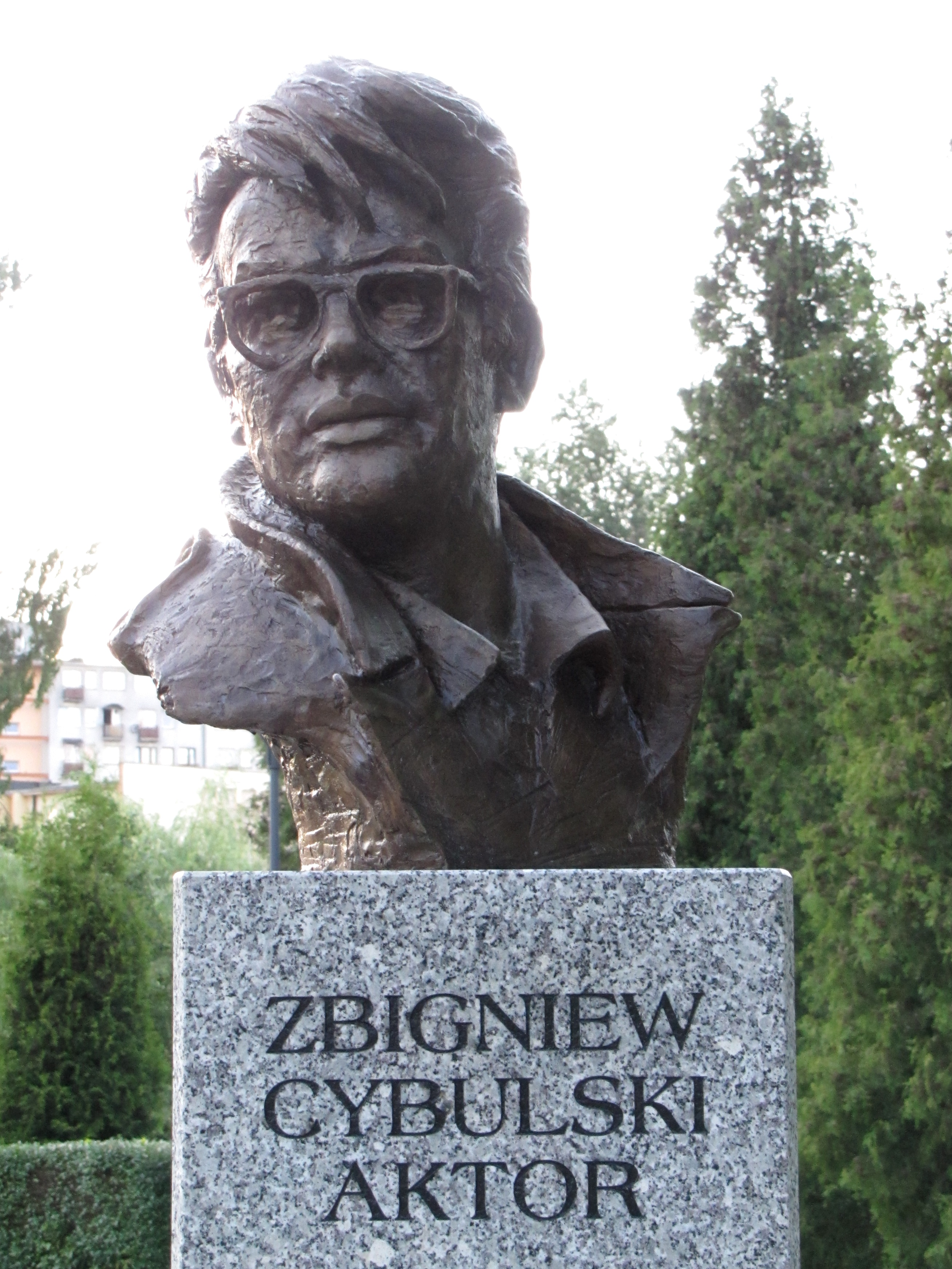
Bust of Zbigniew Cybulski in Kielce

Cybulski remains a legend of the Polish cinema. His style of acting was revolutionary at the time, as was his image (leather clothes and big sunglasses). He was often referred to as "the Polish James Dean". Like Dean, he played nonconformist rebels, and like him he died young.

In 1969, the Zbigniew Cybulski Award (Polish: Nagroda im. Zbyszka Cybulskiego) for young film actors with strong individuality was introduced.

The Polish band 2 Plus 1 recorded a tribute album to Cybulski, called Aktor in 1977.

In 1996, readers of Film magazine awarded him the title of Best Polish Actor of All Time. In 2009, he won a similar poll by the readers of Newsweek Polska.

== Partial filmography ==
- 1955: A Generation – Kostek
- 1955: Kariera – Bus Passenger (uncredited)
- 1955: Trzy starty – Mietek Leśniak
- 1956: Tajemnica dzikiego szybu – Miner (uncredited)
- 1957: Wraki – Rafał Grabień
- 1957: Koniec nocy – Romek Brzozowski
- 1958: The Eighth Day of the Week – Piotr Terlecki
- 1958: Ashes and Diamonds – Maciek Chełmicki
- 1958: Krzyż Walecznych – Zootechnik Tadeusz Wiecek
- 1959: Night Train – Staszek
- 1960: Do widzenia, do jutra – Jacek
- 1960: Innocent Sorcerers – Edmund
- 1960: Rozstanie – renowned actor
- 1962: Love at Twenty – Zbyszek (segment "Warszawa")
- 1962: La Poupée – Colonel Octavio Prado Roth / Cotal, le rebelle
- 1962: How to Be Loved – Wiktor Rawicz
- 1963: Ich dzień powszedni (Their Everyday Life) – doktor Andrzej Siennicki
- 1963: Zbrodniarz i panna – Capt. Jan Zietek
- 1963: Milczenie – Roman
- 1963: Rozwodów nie będzie – Gruszka (episode 3)
- 1964: To Love – Fredrik
- 1964: Giuseppe w Warszawie – Staszek, Maria's Brother
- 1964: The Saragossa Manuscript – Alfons Van Worden
- 1965: Pingwin – Łukasz
- 1965: Salto – Kowalski / Malinowski
- 1965: Sam pośród miasta – Konrad Ferenc
- 1966: Jutro Meksyk – Paweł Janczak
- 1966: Przedświąteczny wieczór – Zapala's friend
- 1966: Mistrz (TV Movie) – Director of 'Macbeth'
- 1966: Szyfry – Maciek
- 1966: Iluzja (TV Short) – Lover
- 1967: Cała naprzód – Janek
- 1967: Morderca zostawia ślad – Rodecki
- 1967: Jowita – Edward Księżak (final film role)

== See also ==
- Cinema of Poland
- List of Polish actors
