= Tortura nadziei =

1967 Polish film

Tortura nadziei is a Polish historical film. It was released in 1967.
