= Edmund Fetting =

Polish actor and singer

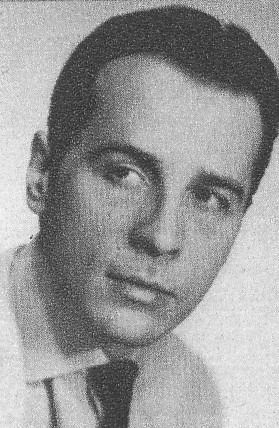
Edmund Fetting (1960s)

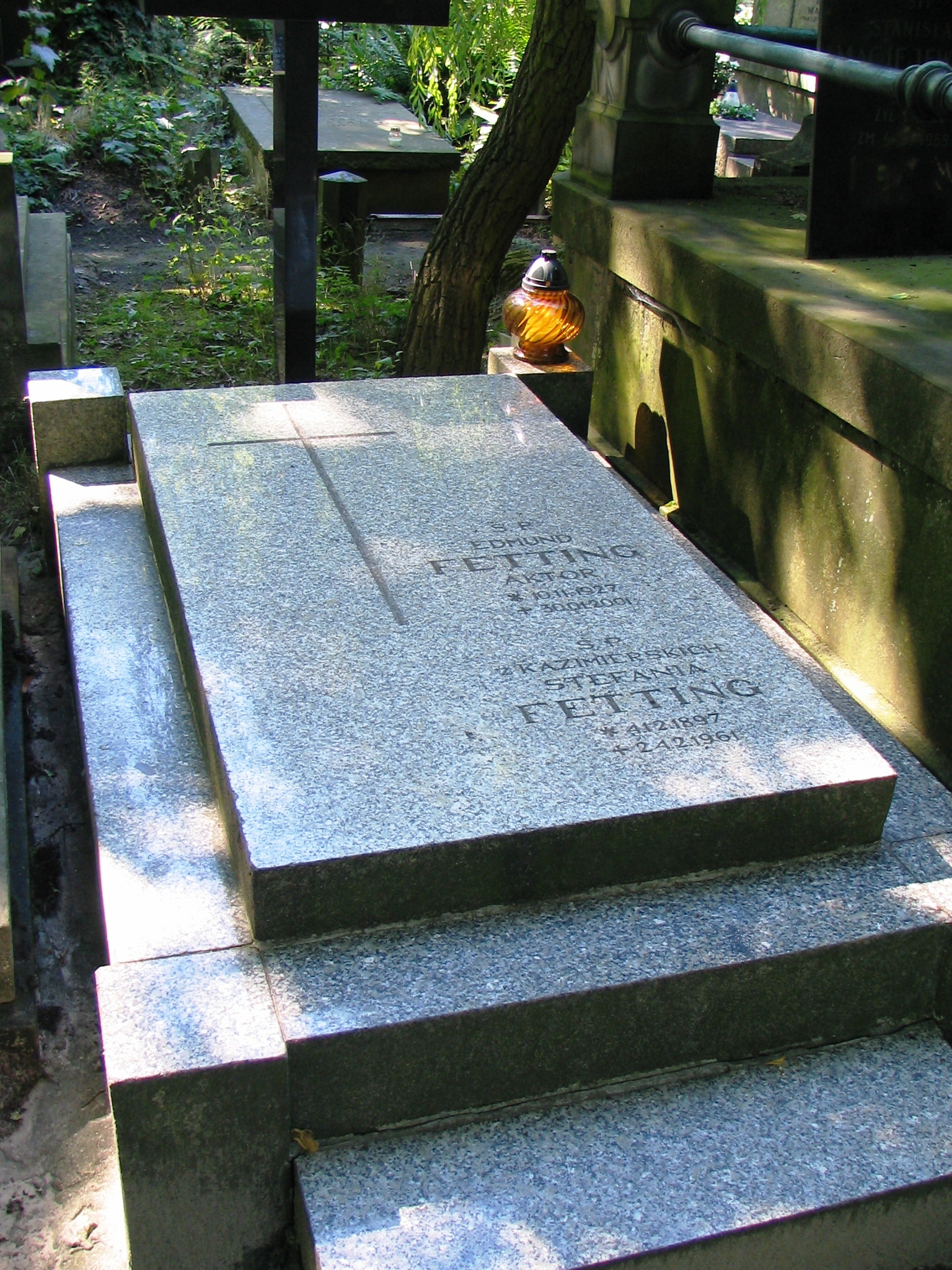
Grave of Fetting at Powązki Cemetery in Warsaw

Edmund Andrzej Fetting (10 November 1927, in Warsaw, Poland – 30 January 2001 there) was a Polish film and theatrical actor and occasional singer.

Fetting was awarded the Knight's Cross of the Order of Polonia Restituta (1980) and the Gold Cross of Merit (1974).

== Partial filmography ==
- Nikodem Dyzma (1956) - Guest
- Wolne miasto (1958) - German with Photo Aparat (uncredited)
- Miejsce na ziemi (1960) - Thief (uncredited)
- Samson (1961) - Guest at Lucyna's Party
- All Souls' Day (1961) - Michal
- Daleka jest droga (1963)
- Zbrodniarz i panna (1963) - Lt. Kaplinski
- Prawo i pięść (1964) - lead song
- Zycie raz jeszcze (1965) - Editor Rydz
- Glos ma prokurator (1965) - prosecutor Andrzej Tabor
- The Ashes (1965) - Austrian Official
- Katastrofa (1966) - Rowicki
- Lenin in Poland (1966) - Honecki
- Znicz olimpijski (1970) - Gestapo chief
- Ostatni swiadek (1970) - Klaus Goltz
- Lokis (1970) - Pastor
- Brylanty pani Zuzy (1972) - Krzysztof / Gang Boss
- Jak daleko stad, jak blisko (1972) - Szymon
- Die Elixiere des Teufels (1973, DEFA) - Judge
- Zazdrosc i medycyna (1973) - Dr. Willi von Fuchs
- In Desert and Wilderness (1973) - Mr Georg Rawlison
- Zaczarowane podwórko (1974)
- Gniazdo (1974) - Krystian, Dubrawa's brother
- Death of a President (1977) - General Józef Haller
- Sprawa Gorgonowej (1977) - Inspector Piatkiewicz
- Tanczacy jastrzab (1977)
- Pasja (1978) - Zajaczkowski
- Inquest of Pilot Pirx (1979) - Oskarzyciel przed trybunalem
- Droga daleka przed nami... (1980)
- Ojciec królowej (1980) - Austrian Ambassador
- Dzien Wisly (1980) - Professor
- Głosy (1980) - Psychiatrist Meller
- Polonia Restituta (1981) - David Lloyd George
- Nad Niemnem (1987) - Darzecki
