= Lucyna Winnicka =

Polish actress (1928–2013)

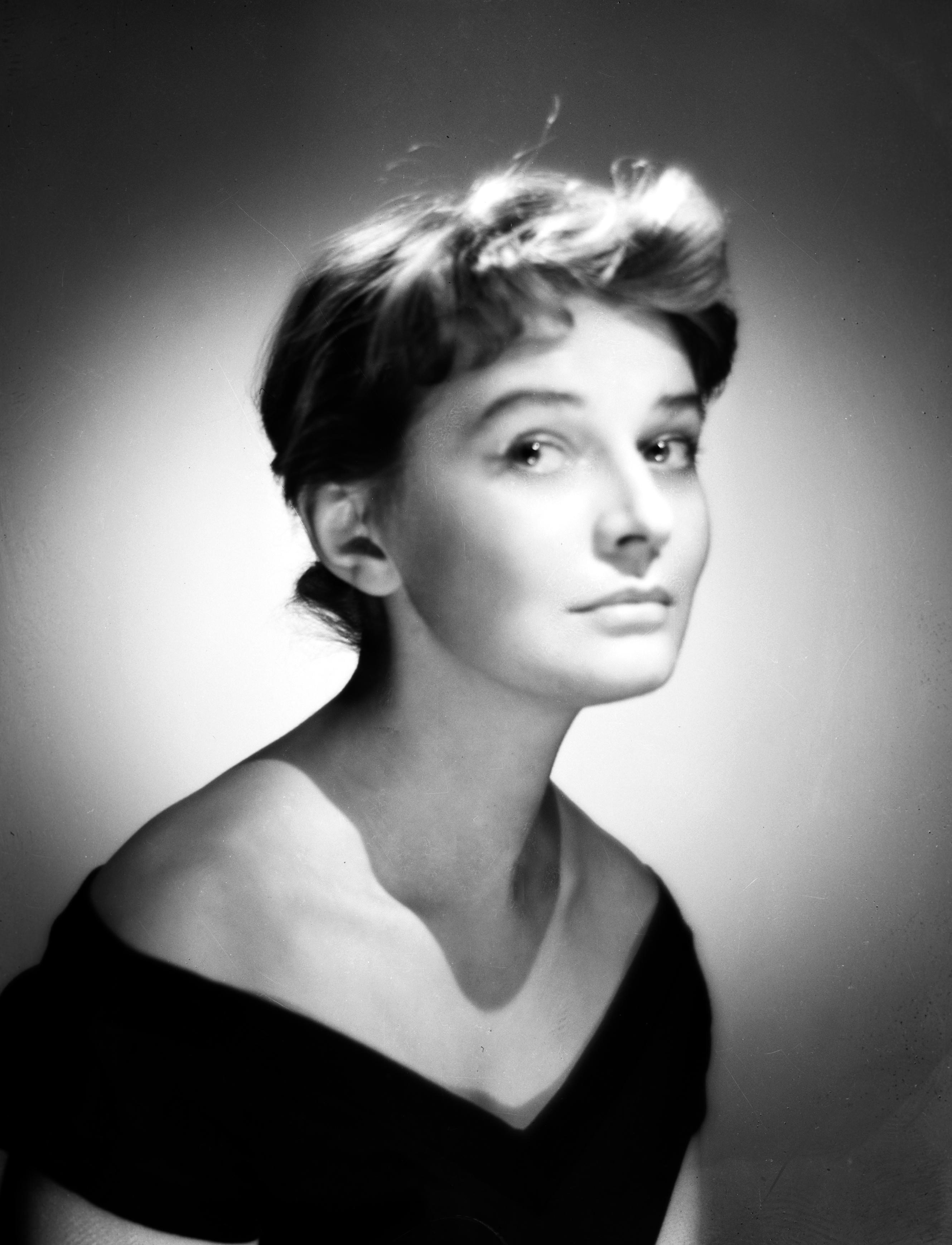
- Born: 14 July 1928; Warsaw, Poland
- Died: 22 January 2013 (aged 84); Palmiry, Poland
- Occupation: Actress
- Years active: 1954–1978

Lucyna Winnicka (14 July 1928 – 22 January 2013) was a Polish actress. She appeared in 21 films between 1954 and 1978. She played the lead role in the film Mother Joan of the Angels, which won the Special Jury Prize at the 1961 Cannes Film Festival. In 1967, she was a member of the jury at the 5th Moscow International Film Festival.

== Partial filmography ==
- Pod gwiazdą frygijską (1954) - Madzia
- The Real End of the Great War (1957) - Róza Zborska
- Night Train (1959) - Marta
- First Spaceship on Venus (1960) - Fernsehreporterin / Joan Moran
- Knights of the Teutonic Order (1960) - Duchess Anna Danuta of Masovia
- Mother Joan of the Angels (1961) - Mother Joan of the Angels
- Godzina pasowej rózy (1963) - Eleonora
- Pamietnik pani Hanki (1963) - Hanka Niementowska-Renowicka
- Ubranie prawie nowe (1964) - Director's Wife
- Sam posród miasta (1965) - Ewa
- Sposób bycia (1966) - Irena - Wife
- Pharaoh (1966) - Priestess (uncredited)
- Sarajevski atentat (1968) - Sofija
- Gra (1969) - Wife
- 322 (1969) - Marta
- Szerelmesfilm (1970) - Ágnes
- Na wylot (1973) - Photo Salon Owner
- Tüzoltó utca 25. (1973) - Maria
- A Woman's Decision (1975) - (uncredited)
- Wieczne pretensje (1975) - Lab Assistant
- Ognie sa jeszcze zywe (1976) - Dr. Wanda Poplawska
- Indeks (1977) - Secretary Marina
