= Kazimierz Opaliński =

Polish actor (1890–1979)

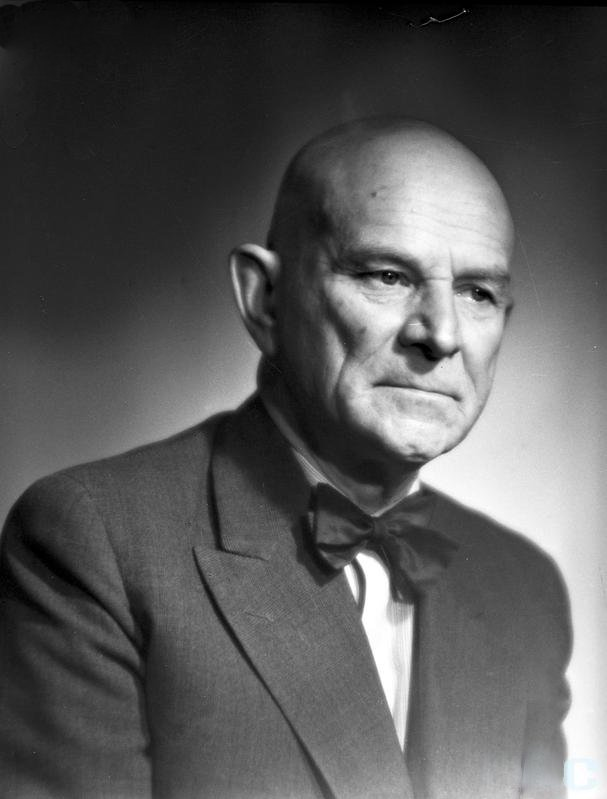
- Born: 22 February 1890; Przemyśl, Galicia, Austria-Hungary (now Przemyśl, Poland)
- Died: 6 June 1979 (aged 89); Warsaw, Poland
- Occupation: Actor
- Years active: 1933-1970 (film)

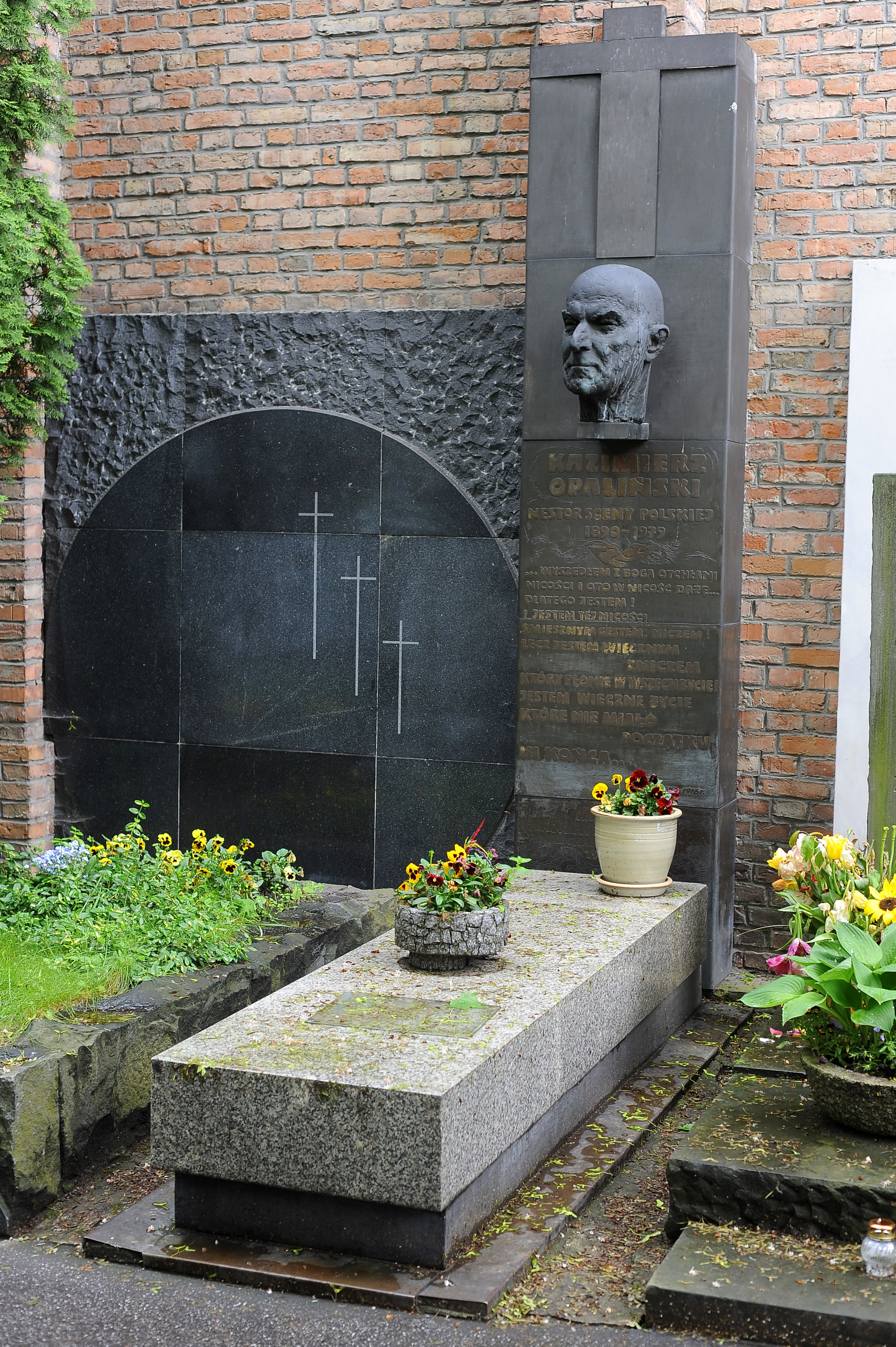
Grave of Opaliński at the Powązki Cemetery in Warsaw

Kazimierz Opaliński (22 February 1890 – 6 June 1979) was a Polish stage and film actor. He appeared in more than forty films between 1936 and 1975.

== Selected filmography ==
Year	Title	Role	Notes
1936	Barbara Radziwiłłówna		
1951	Warsaw Premiere		
1953	Three Stories		
1954	Five Boys from Barska Street		
1957	Man on the Tracks		
1958	Eroica		
1960	Bad Luck		
1963	Black Wings		
1965	The Saragossa Manuscript		
1966	Pharaoh		
1972	Boleslaw Smialy		
1975	The Promised Land		
