= The Last Day of Summer (1958 film) =

- Directed by: Tadeusz Konwicki
- Written by: Tadeusz Konwicki
- Starring: Irena Laskowska; Jan Machulski
- Cinematography: Jan Laskowski
- Edited by: Wiesława Otocka
- Distributed by: KADR
- Release date: August 4, 1958
- Running time: 66 mins
- Country: Poland
- Language: Polish

The Last Day of Summer (Polish: Ostatni dzień lata) is a 1958 romantic drama film directed by the Polish film director Tadeusz Konwicki.

== Plot ==
The action takes place amid the deserted dunes and screaming gulls of a chilly Baltic shore. Two lonely, damaged people, played by Irena Laskowska and Jan Machulski, whose characters remain nameless throughout the film, happen to meet on a deserted beach. Both are haunted by vivid memories of World War II and make silent, imperfect attempts to reach out to each other, but they cannot find a means to communicate.

== See also ==
- Cinema of Poland
- List of Polish language films
