= Ewa Petelska =

Polish film director (1920–2013)

- Born: 24 December 1920; Pyzdry, Wielkopolskie, Poland
- Died: 20 August 2013 (aged 92); Warsaw, Poland
- Occupations: Film director, screenwriter
- Years active: 1951–1990

Ewa Petelska (24 December 1920 – 20 August 2013) was a Polish film director and screenwriter. She directed 26 films between 1951 and 1985. Her 1963 film Black Wings (Czarne skrzydła) was entered into the 3rd Moscow International Film Festival where it won a Silver Prize. Her 1973 film Copernicus (Kopernik) was entered into the 8th Moscow International Film Festival where it won the Silver Prize.

She often collaborated with her husband, Czesław Petelski.

== Selected filmography ==
- Ogniomistrz Kaleń (1961)
- Black Wings (1963)
- Tortura nadziei (1967)
- Kwestia sumienia (1967)
- Copernicus (1973)
- Kazimierz Wielki (1976)
