= Kwestia sumienia =

1967 Polish film by Ewa Petelska

Kwestia sumienia is a Polish historical film. It was released in 1967.
