= How to Be Loved (film) =

1963 Polish film

How to be Loved
- Directed by: Wojciech Has
- Written by: Kazimierz Brandys
- Starring: Zbigniew Cybulski; Barbara Krafftówna
- Cinematography: Stefan Matyjaszkiewicz
- Edited by: Zofia Dwornik
- Music by: Lucjan Kaszycki
- Distributed by: Zespół Filmowy Kamera
- Release date: 1963
- Running time: 97 minutes
- Language: Polish

How to be Loved (Polish: Jak być kochaną) is a 1963 Polish film, directed by Wojciech Has.

The film, based on a novel of the same name by Kazimierz Brandys, examines the emotional casualties of war, which is perhaps the central theme of the Polish Film School. On a deeper level, the film manages to construct a personal tragedy that results from a struggle of egoism and cowardice versus devotion and courage.

The film was entered into the 1963 Cannes Film Festival.

== Plot ==
On a plane bound for Paris, Felicja (Barbara Krafftówna), a successful radio actress, recalls the night in 1939 when she was to debut as Ophelia, with the man she loved, Wiktor (Zbigniew Cybulski), playing Hamlet. World War II intervenes, and Felicja takes a job as a waitress to avoid acting on a German stage, giving her lover sanctuary when he's accused of killing a collaborator. After the war, Wiktor can't get away fast enough, hot on the trail of fame and applause, and the woman who saved him is herself wrongly accused of collaboration. Years later, Wiktor and Felicja meet again, and the tables have turned.

== Cast ==
- Barbara Krafftówna as Felicja
- Zbigniew Cybulski as Wiktor Rawicz
- Artur Młodnicki as Tomasz
- Wieńczysław Gliński as bacteriologist
- Wiesław Gołas as German soldier
- Wiesława Kwaśniewska as photographer
- Zdzisław Maklakiewicz as journalist Zenon
- Tadeusz Kalinowski - Peters
- Mirosława Krajewska as flight attendant

== See also ==
- Cinema of Poland
- List of Polish language films
