= Bad Luck (1960 film) =

1960 Polish film

- Original Polish poster
- Zezowate szczęście
- Directed by: Andrzej Munk
- Written by: Jerzy Stefan Stawiński
- Starring: Bogumił Kobiela
- Cinematography: Jerzy Lipman; Krzysztof Winiewicz
- Edited by: Jadwiga Zajiček
- Production companies: Film Polski; Zespół Realizatorów Filmowych „KADR”
- Release date: May 1960
- Running time: 92 minutes
- Country: Poland
- Language: Polish

Bad Luck (Polish: Zezowate szczęście) is a 1960 Polish black comedy film directed by Andrzej Munk. The screenplay is based on Jerzy Stawiński’s novel Six Incarnations of Jan Piszczyk (1959).

Bad Luck was entered into the 1960 Cannes Film Festival.

== Plot ==
Bad Luck reflects the episodic source material by novelist Jerzy Stawiński from which it is adapted. Jan Piszczyk is petty bourgeois Jew and son of a Warsaw tailor. The story opens when the middle-aged Piszczyk is laid off from a job, and bemoans his fate. He provides a retrospective on his life in a series of flashbacks, spanning the history of Poland from the rise of fasict anti-Semitism during the 1920s to the postwar Stalinist period. Piszczyk emerges as a political and social chameleon, willing to accommodate himself to any situation. His opportunism propels him repeatedly into ludicrous and pathetic failures.

== Cast ==
- Bogumił Kobiela – Jan Piszczyk
- Maria Ciesielska– Basia
- Helena Dąbrowska – Wychówna
- Barbara Lass – Jola Wrona-Wrońska (as Barbara Kwiatkowska)
- Krystyna Karkowska – Wrona-Wrońska
- Barbara Połomska – Zosia Jelonkowa
- Irena Stalończyk – Irena Kropaczynska
- Tadeusz Bartosik – Wasik
- Henryk Bak – Director
- Mariusz Dmochowski – UB Officer
- Aleksander Dzwonkowski – Cezary Piszczyk
- Edward Dziewoński – Jelonek
- Tadeusz Janczar – Ens. Sawicki
- Stanisław Jaworski – Watchmaker
- Andrzej Krasicki – Witold Kropaczyński
- Wojciech Lityński – Young Jan Piszczyk
- Kazimierz Opaliński – Prison Governor
- Jerzy Pichelski – Maj. Wrona-Wronski
- Adam Pawlikowski – Ens. Osewski
- Witold Sadowy – soldier pretending to be Adolf Hitler
- Wojciech Siemion – Józef Kacperski
- Maria Kaniewska - Anastazja Makulec
- Jan Tadeusz Stanisławski – Chief Scout
- Tadeusz Waczkowski – Manager Kozienicki

== Sequel ==
In 1988, the film Citizen Piszczyk was made, directed by Andrzej Kotkowski. Jerzy Stuhr played the main role.

== Sources ==
- Niemitz, Dorota. 2014. The legacy of postwar Polish filmmaker Andrzej Munk. World Socialist Web Site. 13 October, 2014. https://www.wsws.org/en/articles/2014/10/13/munk-o13.html Retrieved 08 July, 2022.
