= Józef Łodyński =

Polish actor

Józef Łodyński (19 October 1919, Łódź – 6 February 1984, Łódź) was a Polish actor.

He graduated from The Aleksander Zelwerowicz National Academy of Dramatic Art in Warsaw in 1951. For most of his professional life associated with Stefan Jaracz Theatre in Łódź. From 1964 to 1981, he played in several productions for the Television Theatre.
