= Tadeusz Chmielewski =

Polish film director, screenwriter and film producer

- Born: 7 June 1927; Tomaszów Mazowiecki, Poland
- Died: 4 December 2016 (aged 89); Warsaw, Poland
- Education: National Film School in Łódź
- Occupations: Film director, screenwriter, film producer
- Spouse: Halina Chmielewska
- Children: 1
- Awards: Medal for Merit to Culture – Gloria Artis (2010)

Tadeusz Chmielewski (Polish pronunciation: [taˈdɛ.uʂ xmjɛˈlɛfskʲi]; 7 June 1927 – 4 December 2016) was a Polish film director, screenwriter and film producer, most notable for being one of the pioneers of popular Polish comedy. During World War II and until 1948, he was a soldier for the National Armed Forces and the Home Army.

== Biography ==
Chmielewski was born in Tomaszów Mazowiecki and graduated from secondary school in Szczecin. He graduated from the National Film School in Łódź in 1954. An activist with the Polish Filmmakers Association, he was their vice president from 1983 to 1987. From 1987-89, he was a member of the Cinematography Committee in Poland. Under the pseudonym of his granddaughter Zofii Miller, he wrote the screenplay U Pana Boga za piecem. In 1984, he was the head of the Film "EYE".

In 2005, Chmielewski received the honorary citizenship from the city of Tomaszów Mazowiecki. In 2010 he was awarded the Medal for Merit to Culture – Gloria Artis. In 2011 he was awarded the "Eagle" in the Polish Film Awards.

Several of Tadeusz Chmielewski's films were realized together with his wife, Halina Chmielewska, also a film director and screenwriter. Tadeusz Chmielewski's father was a policeman in Tomaszów. During World War II, his father commanded Partisan movements. After the war, his father was reportedly captured and murdered by Communist Polish authorities. Tadeusz and Helena had one daughter, Agata Chmielewska, a graphic designer and painter.
