= Man on the Tracks =

- Directed by: Andrzej Munk
- Written by: Andrzej Munk; Jerzy Stefan Stawiński
- Starring: Kazimierz Opaliński; Zygmunt Maciejewski
- Cinematography: Romuald Kropat; Jerzy Wójcik
- Distributed by: KADR
- Release date: 1957
- Running time: 89 minutes
- Country: Poland
- Language: Polish

Man on the Tracks (Polish: Człowiek na torze) is a 1956 film by Andrzej Munk.

== Summary ==
The film tells the story, mostly in flashback, of a railway worker who was fired from his job for alleged sabotage of the Socialist methods of work.

== Background ==
Man on the Tracks was one of the first films of the Polish Film School and as such influenced the whole generation of young directors who participated in the movement.

Historian Dorota Niemitz writes:

The devotion of the rail workers to their jobs is central to Man on the Tracks. There is no talk of low pay, the long hours or missing time with friends and family—all the railway men care about is doing their work well. Efficiency and competence are matters of honor, and the failure of a train to arrive on schedule is treated as a personal failure. Taking into account the pressures exerted by the Stalinist regime, these sentiments no doubt also reflect the genuine aspiration of wide layers of the Polish population after the horrors of the 1930s and 1940s to construct a new, more egalitarian society.”

== Cast ==
- Kazimierz Opaliński - Władysław Orzechowski
- Zygmunt Maciejewski - Tuszka
- Zygmunt Zintel - Witold Sałata
- Zygmunt Listkiewicz - Stanisław Zapora
- Roman Kłosowski - Marek Nowak
- Janusz Bylczyński - Warda, member of the committee
- Józef Para - railwayman
- Natalia Szymańska - wife of Orzechowski
- Józef Nowak - helper of Orzechowski
- Janusz Paluszkiewicz - Krokus, a mechanic
- Leon Niemczyk - man on the platform
- Stanisław Jaworski - Franek, a friend of Orzechowski

== See also ==
- Cinema of Poland
- List of Polish-language films

== Sources ==
- Niemitz, Dorota. 2014. The legacy of postwar Polish filmmaker Andrzej Munk. World Socialist Web Site. 13 October, 2014. https://www.wsws.org/en/articles/2014/10/13/munk-o13.html Retrieved 08 July, 2022.
