= Eroica (1958 film) =

1958 Polish film by Andrzej Munk

- Directed by: Andrzej Munk
- Written by: Jerzy Stefan Stawiński
- Starring: Edward Dziewoński; Tadeusz Łomnicki; Leon Niemczyk
- Cinematography: Jerzy Wójcik
- Music by: Jan Krenz
- Distributed by: KADR
- Release date: 1958
- Running time: 87 minutes
- Country: Poland
- Language: Polish

Eroica (released in some territories as Heroism) is a 1958 Polish film by Andrzej Munk, and his second feature film after Man on the Tracks (1956). Eroica is composed of two separate stories, presenting satirical critiques of two aspects of the Polish character: acquisitive opportunism, and a romantic fascination for heroic martyrs.

The film's title is an ironic reference to Ludwig van Beethoven's Third Symphony, which the composer initially dedicated to then French head Consulate Napoleon Bonaparte. When Napoleon declared himself Emperor, Beethoven, a devout republican, withdrew the dedication in disgust and titled the work simply "Eroica".

Eroica premiered on Polish Television in 1972 and depicts wartime couriers crossing the Tatra Mountains.

Eroica won the FIPRESCI Award at the 1959 Mar del Plata Film Festival.

== Plot ==
=== Scherzo Alla Pollacca ===
The first part is a bitter, tragicomic story of Dzidziuś ("Babyface"), a street-wise bon-vivant, drunkard, and coward who unwillingly joins the Home Army during the Warsaw Uprising. Dzidziuś' wife, Zosia, is having an affair with a Hungarian officer and Dzidziuś reluctantly becomes the messenger between the Home Army and the Hungarian unit, which is considering changing sides.

=== Ostinato Lugubre ===
The second part is set in a POW camp for Polish soldiers. Lt. Zawistowski, one of the internees, decides to attempt to escape. While none of his fellow inmates are sure whether he succeeded, his absence upsets the guards and provides hope and inspiration for the prisoners. Soon his legend grows, making him a hero within the camp and helping to boost the prisoners' morale. However, it turns out that Lt. Zawistowski didn't actually follow through on his escape plans, but is hiding in the attic of one of the barracks.

== Cast ==
- Edward Dziewoński as Dzidziuś Górkiewicz
- Tadeusz Łomnicki as Lt. Zawistowski
- Barbara Połomska as Zosia, wife of Dzidziuś
- Ignacy Machowski as the Home Army Major
- Leon Niemczyk as the Hungarian officer
- Kazimierz Opaliński as the Home Army commander of Mokotów
- Kazimierz Rudzki as Lt. Turek
- Henryk Bąk as Lt. Krygier
- Roman Kłosowski as Szpakowski
- Bogumił Kobiela as Lt. Dąbecki
- Stanisław Bareja as a Home Army soldier
- Witold Pyrkosz as Kardas
- Wojciech Siemion as Lt. Marianek

== Critical Assessment ==
Historian Dorota Niemitz offers this on the cinematography of Eroica:

Some of the director's experiments with camera work and the "theatrical" use of space in certain scenes (an individual in a large space versus groups stuck in a small one), are less successful and fail to create a cohesive unity. So "Eroica" becomes a bit tiresome, and leaves the viewer with the feeling of an unfinished piece that does not entirely live up to its ambitious aspirations.

== See also ==
- Cinema of Poland
- List of Polish language films
