= Night Train (1959 film) =

- Directed by: Jerzy Kawalerowicz
- Written by: Jerzy Kawalerowicz; Jerzy Lutowski
- Starring: Lucyna Winnicka; Leon Niemczyk; Zbigniew Cybulski
- Cinematography: Jan Laskowski
- Edited by: Wieslawa Otocka
- Music by: Andrzej Trzaskowski
- Production company: Zespół realizatorów filmowych „Kadr”
- Release date: 6 September 1959 (Venice)
- Running time: 93 minutes
- Country: Poland
- Language: Polish

Night Train (Polish: Pociąg), also known as The Train, or Baltic Express, is a 1959 Polish film directed by Jerzy Kawalerowicz and starring Zbigniew Cybulski, Lucyna Winnicka and Leon Niemczyk.

== Plot ==
Two strangers, Jerzy (Leon Niemczyk) and Marta (Lucyna Winnicka), accidentally end up holding tickets for the same sleeping chamber on an overnight train to the Baltic Sea coast; and reluctantly agree to share the 2-bed single-gender compartment. Also on board is Marta's spurned lover Staszek (Zbigniew Cybulski), unwilling to accept her decision to break up after a short term affair, and leave her alone. When the police enter the train in search of a murderer on the lam, rumors fly and everything seems to point toward one of the main characters as the culprit.

== Cast ==
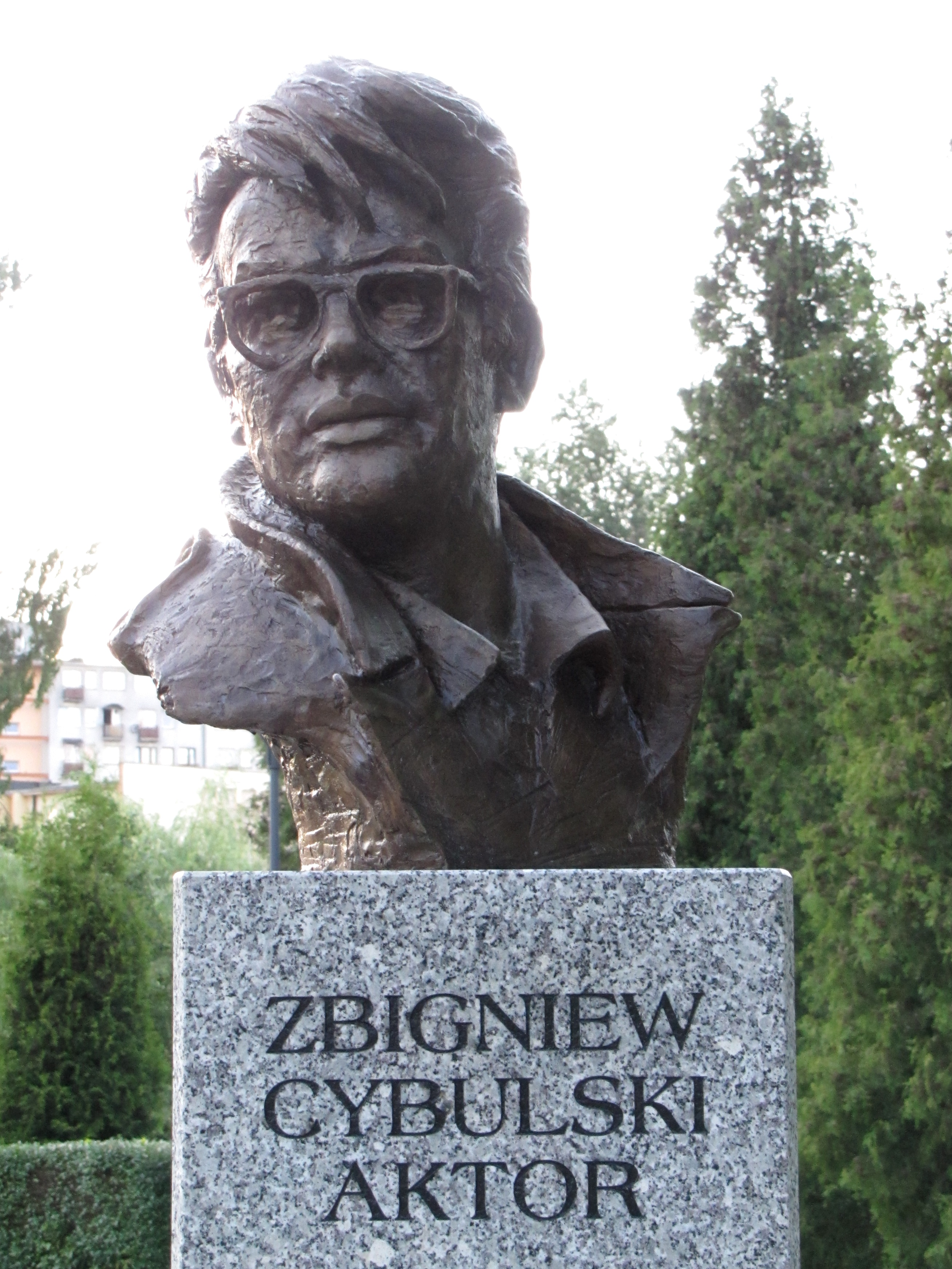
Zbigniew Cybulski, Staszek

- Lucyna Winnicka - Marta
- Leon Niemczyk - Jerzy
- Zbigniew Cybulski - Staszek
- Teresa Szmigielówna - Lawyer's Wife
- Helena Dąbrowska - Train Controller
- Ignacy Machowski - Passenger
- Roland Głowacki - Murderer
- Aleksander Sewruk - Lawyer
- Zygmunt Zintel - Passenger Suffering from Insomnia
- Tadeusz Gwiazdowski - Train Controller
- Witold Skaruch - Priest
- Michał Gazda - Passenger Flirting with Lawyer's Wife
- Zygmunt Malawski - Policeman

== Reception ==
Night Train received numerous awards including the Georges Méliès award, and the Best Foreign Actress at the 1959 Venice Film Festival awarded to Lucyna Winnicka for her role as Marta in Night Train. American filmmaker Martin Scorsese recognized the film as one of the masterpieces of Polish cinema and in 2013 he selected it for screening alongside films such as Ashes and Diamonds, Innocent Sorcerers, Knife in the Water and The Promised Land in the United States, Canada and United Kingdom as part of the Martin Scorsese Presents: Masterpieces of Polish Cinema festival of Polish films.

== See also ==
- Cinema of Poland
- List of Polish language films
