= The Real End of the Great War =

1957 film directed by Jerzy Kawalerowicz

- Directed by: Jerzy Kawalerowicz
- Written by: Jerzy Zawieyski, Jerzy Kawalerowicz
- Starring: Lucyna Winnicka, Janina Sokołowska, Roland Głowacki, Andrzej Szalawski, Olga Bielska
- Cinematography: Jerzy Lipman
- Edited by: Wiesława Otocka
- Music by: Adam Walaciński
- Release date: 1957
- Running time: 85 minutes
- Country: Poland
- Language: Polish

The Real End of the Great War is the English title for Prawdziwy koniec wielkiej wojny, a 1957 film directed by Jerzy Kawalerowicz.

== Plot ==
Roza (Lucyna Winnicka) marries a promising young architect, Juliusz (Roland Glowacki). They have a blissful life together for the first few months, but then World War II breaks out and Juliusz is deported to a concentration camp soon after. Months and years go by, and Roza gradually abandons any hope that her husband might return. She meets and falls in love with another man, and tries to put her life back together, but one day, unexpectedly, Juliusz does return - a shattered ghost of his former self, physically crippled and tormented by memories of the camps. First out of duty, and then out of pity, Roza starts to care for him, but her feelings slowly transform into a kind of revulsion.

Kawalerowicz here takes up a theme that would be frequently addressed by later Polish films: the lingering psychological and emotional scars wrought by the war, a kind of weight from the past impeding the creation of any kind of future.

== See also ==
- Cinema of Poland
- List of Polish language films
