= Czesław Petelski =

Polish film director

- Born: 5 November 1922; Białystok, Podlaskie, Poland
- Died: 19 September 1996 (aged 73); Warsaw, Poland
- Occupations: Film director, screenwriter
- Years active: 1953-1990

Czesław Petelski (5 November 1922 – 19 September 1996) was a Polish film director and screenwriter. He directed 25 films between 1953 and 1990. His 1963 film Black Wings was entered into the 3rd Moscow International Film Festival where it won a Silver Prize. In 1965 he was a member of the jury at the 4th Moscow International Film Festival. His 1973 film Copernicus was entered into the 8th Moscow International Film Festival where it won the Silver Prize.

He often worked together with his wife Ewa Petelska.

== Selected filmography ==
- Ogniomistrz Kaleń (1961)
- Black Wings (1963)
- Copernicus (1973)
