= Andrzej Munk =

Polish film director and screen writer

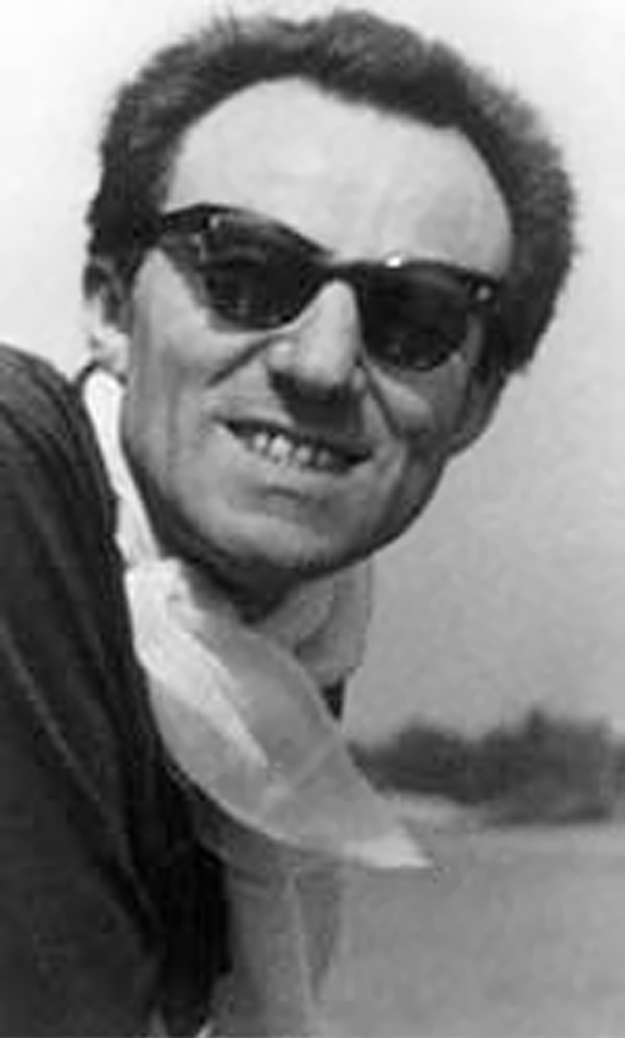
- Andrzej Munk
- Born: 16 October 1921; Kraków, Poland
- Died: 20 September 1961 (aged 39) near Łowicz, Poland
- Education: National Film School in Łódź

Andrzej Munk (16 October 1921 – 20 September 1961) was a Polish film director, screen writer and documentalist. He was one of the most influential artists of the post-Stalinist period in the People's Republic of Poland. His feature films Man on the Tracks (Człowiek na torze, 1956), Eroica (Heroism, 1958), Bad Luck (Zezowate szczęście, 1960), and Passenger (Pasażerka 1963), are considered classics of the Polish Film School developed in mid-1950s. He died as a result of a car crash in Kompina in a head-on collision with a truck.

== Life ==
Munk was born in Kraków in a Jewish family. Krystyna Magdalena Munk was his elder sister. Shortly before World War II (in June 1939), he graduated from a local gymnasium. During the German occupation of Poland he moved to Warsaw, where he was forced to hide. Using a false name, he worked as a construction worker. In 1944 Munk took part in the Warsaw Uprising. After the capitulation, he managed to leave the city and return to Kraków and later Kasprowy Wierch, where he started working as a janitor at the cable railway station.

After the war, Munk returned to Warsaw and joined the reopened Faculty of Architecture at the Warsaw University of Technology. Because of poor health he left the university and later studied law at Warsaw University. Finally he moved to Łódź, where he joined the Łódź Film and Theatre School. He graduated in 1951 and started working as a cameraman for the Polska Kronika Filmowa (Polish Film Chronicle). In this period Munk finished several short films and documents. In 1948 he joined the Polish United Workers' Party, but in 1952 was expelled for "blameworthy behaviour".

== Work ==
In 1956 he finished Man on the Tracks (Człowiek na torze), one of the most important Polish films of the 1950s. The following year he started giving lectures at his alma mater. In 1957 he finished Eroica, a set of two film novels on the Polish idea of heroism and virtue. In 1960 Munk finished his third film, Bad Luck (Zezowate szczęście), a tragicomical story of a Polish everyman who always finds himself in the wrong place and in the wrong time.

Munk died in a car accident near Łowicz on 20 September 1961, while on his way home from the Auschwitz concentration camp where he was shooting Passenger (Pasażerka), released in its partially complete form in 1963.

Since 1965 the Łódź Film School awards the best debut with the Andrzej Munk Film Award. During the 2001 Biennale di Venezia a retrospective festival of his films was organized in Venice.
