= Horpyna (fictional character) =

Fictional character

- First appearance: With Fire and Sword
- Last appearance: With Fire and Sword
- Created by: Henryk Sienkiewicz
- Portrayed by: Ruslana Pysanka

In-universe information
- Gender: Female
- Occupation: witch
- Family: Doniec (brother)
- Nationality: Ruthenian (Ukrainian)

Horpyna is a fictional character in the novel With Fire and Sword by Henryk Sienkiewicz. She is a witch living in Waładynka's Devil's Gorge. Her brother, Doniec, is a Cossack colonel. Horpyna is Bohun's friend.

Horpyna is portrayed by Ruslana Pysanka in the 1999 film by Jerzy Hoffman.

== Story ==
When Horpyna first appeared in the novel, she visited wounded Bohun who was treated by Rzędzian. After capturing Bar, Bohun took Helena Kurcewiczówna to Horpyna's house, the Devil's Valley. Horpyna took care of the wounded girl and told Bohun's fortune. She foretold that Bohun will marry Helena, become a hetman and be betrayed by one of his friends. She also foretold her brother's death and the atrocities of the war in Ukraine. All predictions showed up to be true except for Bohun and Helena's marriage. Horpyna misinterpreted the vision of a hawk above Helena's head - she thought it symbolized Bohun but the hawk was an animal in Jan Skrzetuski's coat of arms. When Bohun left for war, she was to keep Helena in her care until his return. She was shot by Rzędzian who came with Zagłoba and Wołodyjowski to free Helena.

Sienkiewicz placed Horpyna's cave in the gorges around Valea Adîncă which is located in Transnistria.

== Description ==
She is a brazen−faced giantess who is in friendship with devils, but she is a good−looking woman. When she laughs you would swear that a mare was neighing in the meadow. She has white teeth so strong that she might chew up a breastplate. When she walks the ground trembles.
