= Invasion 1700 =

- Directed by: Fernando Cerchio
- Written by: Ugo Imperatore; George St. George
- Starring: Jeanne Crain; John Drew Barrymore; Akim Tamiroff
- Cinematography: Pier Ludovico Pavoni
- Music by: Giovanni Fusco; Francesco De Masi
- Release date: 1962
- Country: Italy
- Languages: Italian; English

Invasion 1700 (Italian: Col ferro e col fuoco, French: Par le fer et par le feu, also known as With Fire and Sword and Daggers of Blood) is a 1962 Italian-French historical epic film directed by Fernando Cerchio. It is based on the 1884 Polish historical novel With Fire and Sword written by Henryk Sienkiewicz.

== Cast ==
- Jeanne Crain as Helena Kurcewiczówna
- Pierre Brice as Jan Skrzetuski
- Elena Zareschi as Princess Kurcewicz
- John Drew Barrymore as Bohun
- Gordon Mitchell as Ulrich
- Akim Tamiroff as Jan Onufry Zagłoba
- Raoul Grassilli as Wasyl Kurcewicz
- Bruno Nessi as Longinus Podbipięta
- Eleonora Vargas as Horpyna
- Gabriella Andreini as Anusia
- Nerio Bernardi as Prince Jeremi Wiśniowiecki
- Nando Angelini as Symeon Kurcewicz
- Alberto Stefanini as Andrzej Kurcewicz
- Milena Vukotic

== See also ==
- With Fire and Sword (1999)
