= With Fire and Sword =

1884 novel by Henryk Sienkiewicz

By Fire and Sword
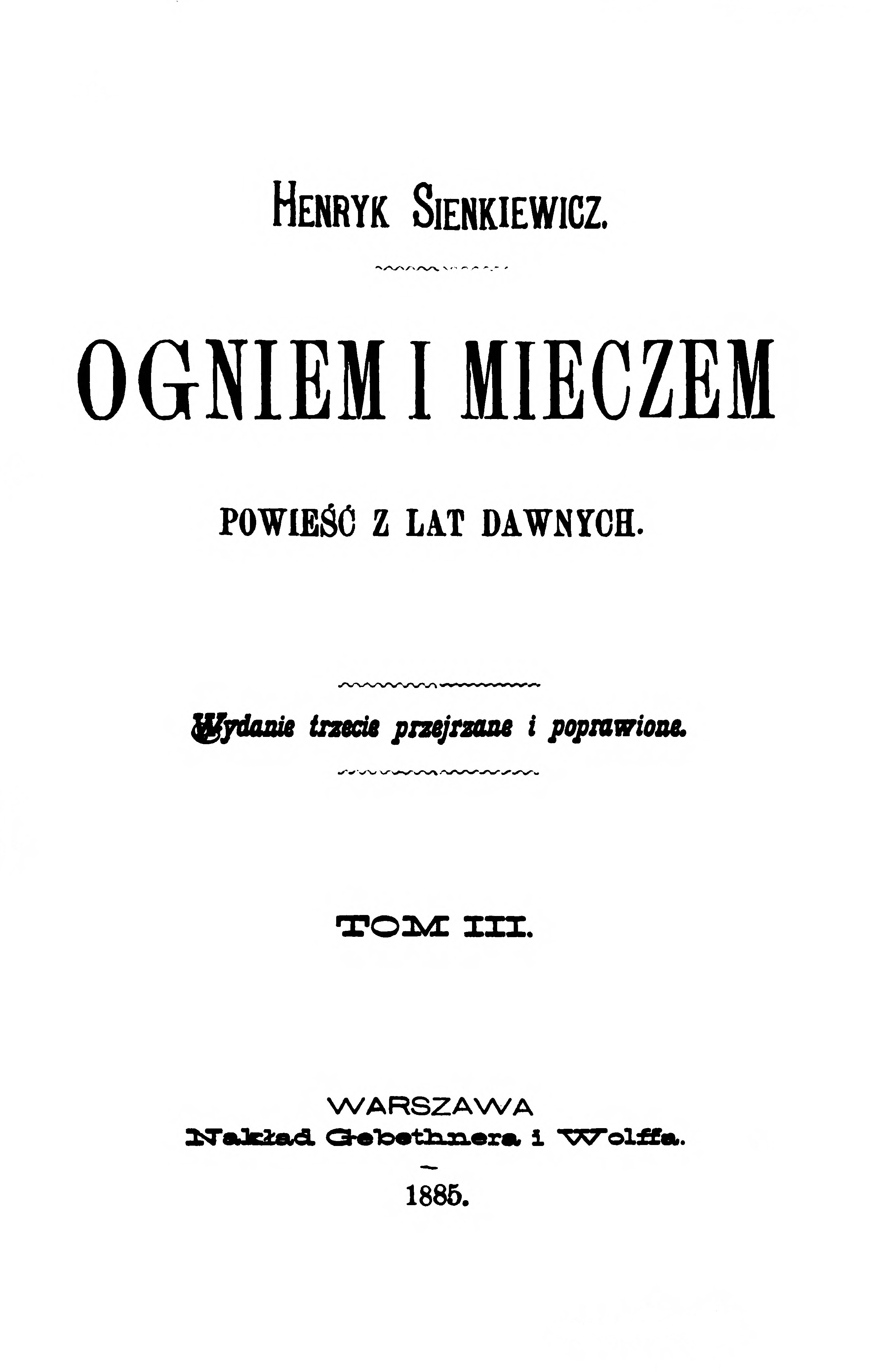
- Title page of an 1885 edition
- Author: Henryk Sienkiewicz
- Original title: Ogniem i mieczem
- Language: Polish
- Series: The Trilogy
- Genre: Historical novel
- Publication date: 1884
- Publication place: Poland
- Followed by: The Deluge

By Fire and Sword (Polish: Ogniem i mieczem) is a historical novel by the Polish author Henryk Sienkiewicz, published in 1884. It is the first volume of a series known to Poles as The Trilogy, followed by The Deluge (Potop, 1886) and Fire in the Steppe (originally published under the Polish title Pan Wołodyjowski, which translates to Sir Wolodyjowski). The novel has been adapted as a film several times, most recently in 1999.

By Fire and Sword is a historical fiction novel, set in the 17th century in the Polish–Lithuanian Commonwealth during the Khmelnytsky Uprising. It was initially serialized in several Polish newspapers, chapters appearing in weekly installments. It gained enormous popularity in Poland, and by the turn of the 20th century had become one of the most popular Polish books ever. It became obligatory reading in Polish schools, and has been translated into English and most European languages.

The series was a vehicle for expressing Polish patriotism in a Poland partitioned and deprived of independence.

== Plot ==
Despite some deviations, the book's historical framework is genuine and the fictional story is woven into real events. Many characters are historical figures, including Jeremi Wiśniowiecki and Bohdan Khmelnytsky. Sienkiewicz researched memoirs and chronicles of the Polish nobility, or szlachta, for details on life in 17th-century Poland. The book was written, according to the author, "to lift up the heart" of the Polish nation in the unhappy period following the failed January Uprising during the era of the partitions of Poland. Thus it often favors epic plots and heroic scenes over historical accuracy. Nonetheless, Sienkiewicz's vivid language made it one of the most popular books about that particular place and era.

=== Chapters I–VIII ===
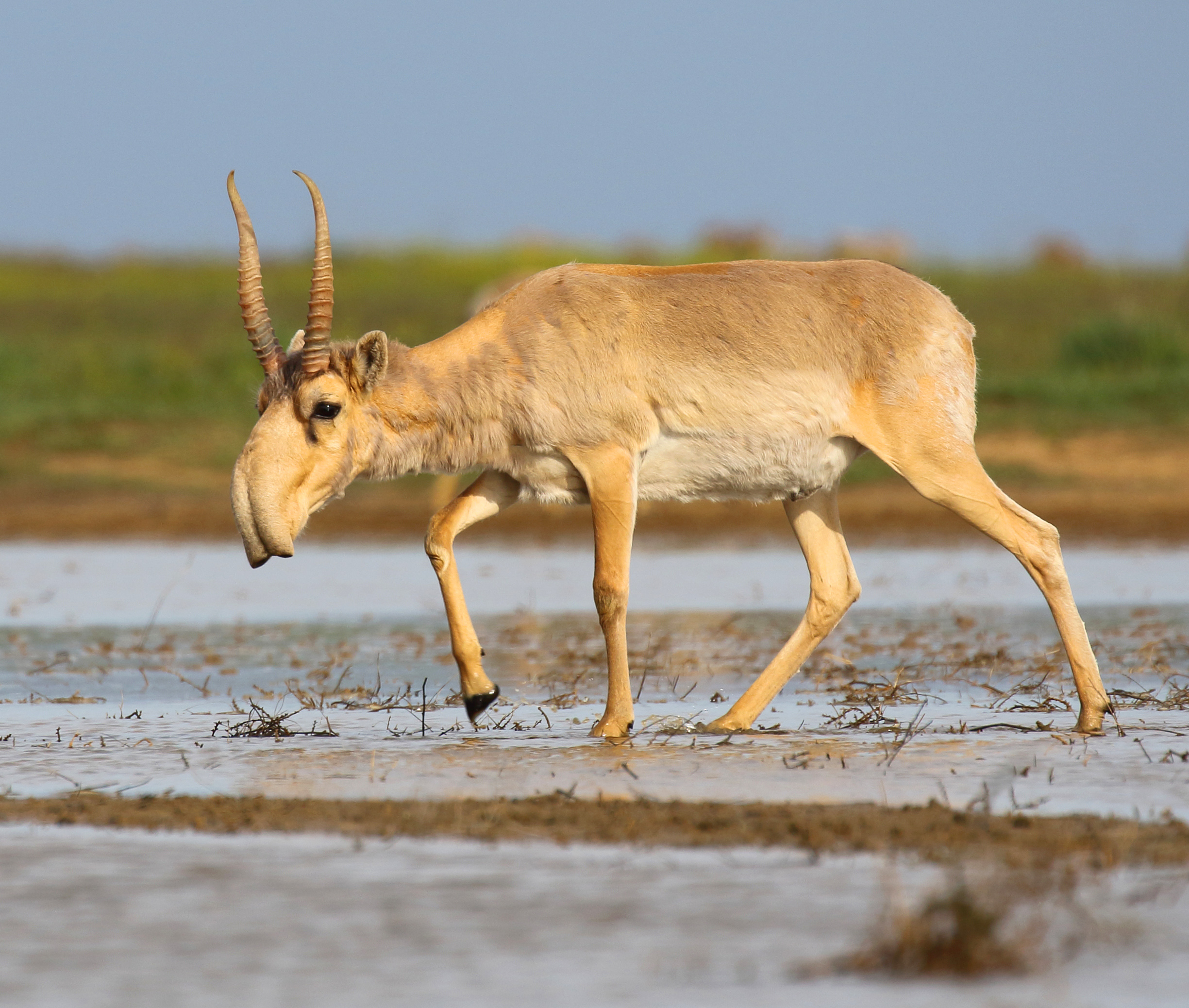
Henryk Sienkiewicz opens "With Fire and Sword" with a description of saigas as a way to highlight the otherworldly setting of the Pontic Steppe. By the time of his writing, these antelope were extinct in the lands of modern Poland.

Jan Skrzetuski, lieutenant of the armoured regiment of Prince Jeremi Wiśniowiecki, gives assistance to Bohdan Zenobi Chmielnicki (first posing as Abdank) as his party are returning from a mission to the Khan through the Wilderness. At Czyhryn the next day, Skrzetuski learns that Chmielnicki was escaping to the Sich. In a tavern he throws Czapliński, a voluble under–starosta (and Chmielnicki's deadly enemy), out through the door. It is here that he also becomes acquainted with Zagłoba and the Lithuanian Podbipięta, who wishes to join the service of Prince Jeremi in order to fulfil his family vow of cutting off the heads of three infidels, all at the same time with one blow.

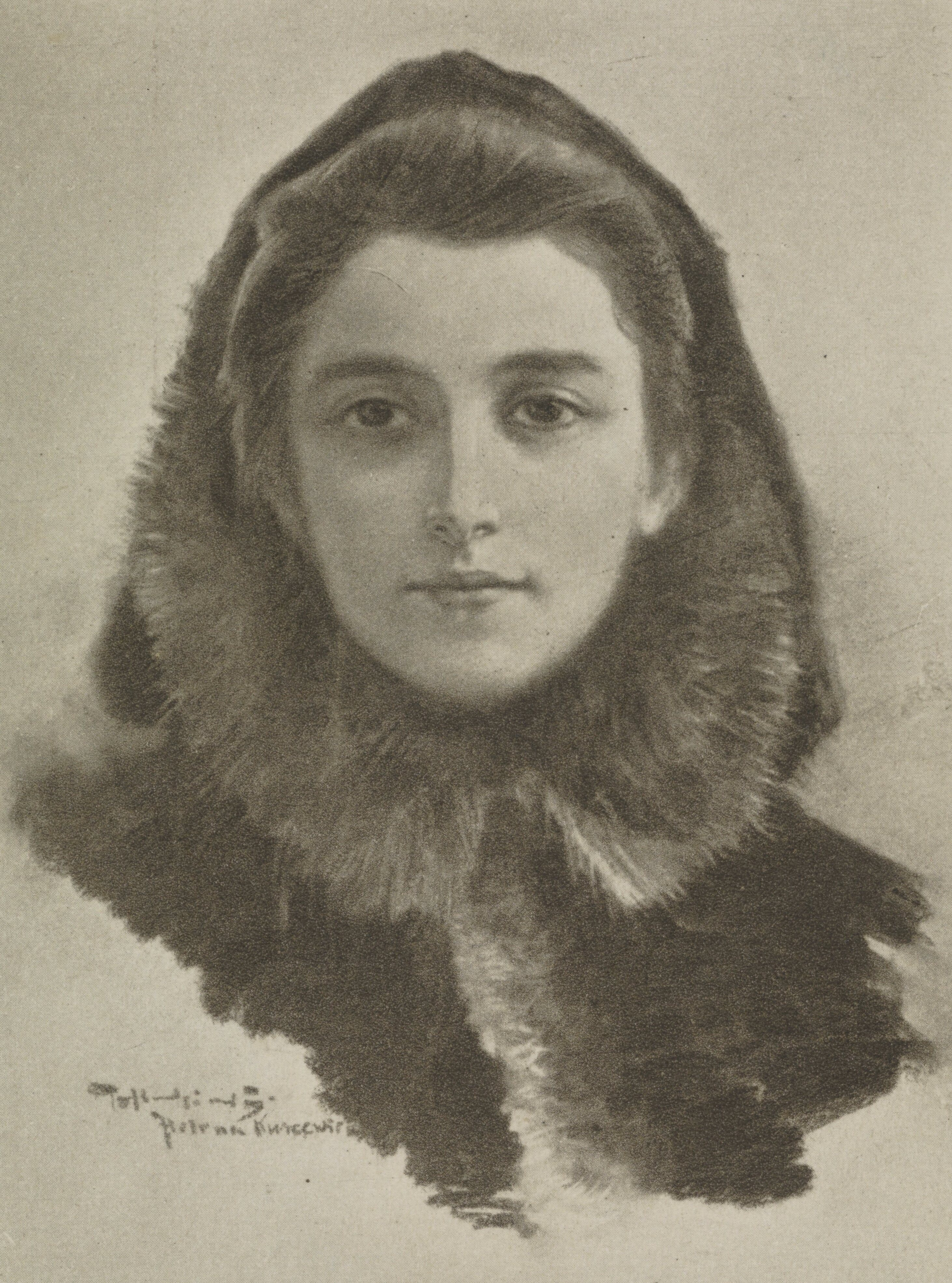
Helena by Piotr Stachiewicz

On their way to Lubni, the party comes to the assistance of two women, one of whom is Helena Kurcewicz, returning to her aunt's home that really belongs to her. Jan's party are invited back to Rozlogi where Jan meets Bohun, a Cossack, adopted as a sixth son by the old princess (Helena's aunt). Bohun wants to pick a quarrel but is sent away and Jan is able to declare his love for Helena. Skrzetuski realizes the girl is being mistreated and denied her rights so gets the princess to promise Helena to him instead of Bohun or he will have Prince Jeremi help her recover home. The lieutenant finally arrives at Lubni and tells his comrades about his mission to the Crimea. Prince Jeremi returns and entertainments are laid on. To wile away the time, Skrzetuski fences with his friend, Michał Wołodyjowski, and receives a response to his letter sent to Helena via Rzędzian, his assistant.

Revolution is now afoot. The prince decides to send an envoy, in a group led by Pan (Sir) Bychowiec, to the Sich to find out about Chmielnicki. Jan persuades him to let him go in his place as he wants to see Helena and receives permission from the prince. He meets Helena once more at Rozlogi and then sets out for Czyhryn. Here, he meets Zaćwilichowski, an old colonel, who says he expects revolt in Ukraine. He also re-encounters Zagłoba who tells him that he has befriended Bohun. Further on his travels he decides to send Rzędzian with a message to Helena to flee the impending hordes. His party encounters some Cossacks and Tartars and a fight breaks out in which Jan's soldiers are slaughtered and he severely wounded. The alliance between the Cossacks and Tartars had been brokered by Chmielnicki, who understood that Cossacks, while having an excellent infantry, could not hope to match the Polish cavalry, the best in Europe. By combining Cossack infantry with Tartar cavalry, the uprising had balanced military force and a chance to beat the Polish army.

=== Chapters IX–XV ===
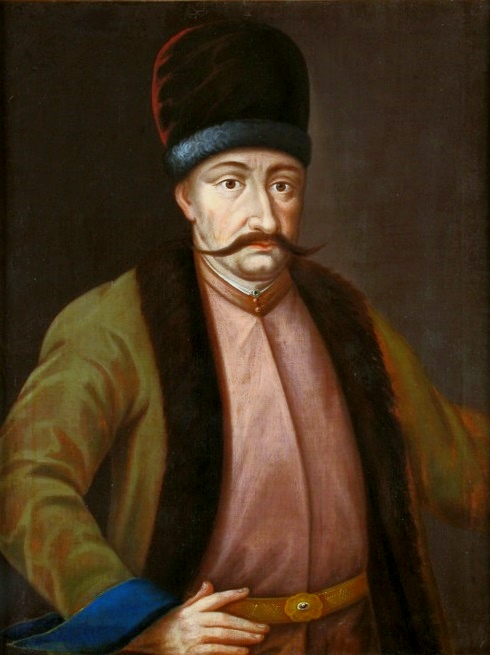
Portrait of Bohdan Chmielnicki (c. 1650) in the District Museum in Tarnów.

The messages to the friends in the court are discovered and two, Barabasz (Barabash) and Tatarczuk (Tatarchuk), are murdered by the Brotherhood of Cossacks. Tuhaj-bej (Tugay Bey), the Tartar leader, is given Jan as a ransom captive and news arrives that the Great Hetman, Mikołaj Potocki, has sent his son Stefan (Stephen) with his army against the Brotherhood, so Chmielnicki is chosen as their leader. The Zaporojians and Tartars march out of the Sitch to meet the Poles marching from Czyhryn. Chmielnicki avoids besieging Kudak. Krzeszowski, a Cossack, is sent to support Potocki but is won over by talks with Chmielnicki and massacres the German mercenaries who refuse to support his betrayal. At Żółte Wody (Zhovti Vody) the Polish hussars become bogged down in the soft mud and cannot attack on the second day of the battle, so Chmielnicki wins it and another at Kruta Bałka.

=== Chapters XVI–XXVII ===
Chmielnicki frees Jan to parley with the Prince. Skrzetuski passes through a devastated landscape to Czyhryn and then to Rozlogi, where he discovers that Helena has disappeared. He mistakenly believes that Helena has been spirited away by Bohun. In reality, after capturing Rzędzian and discovering Skrzetuski's plan to marry Helena, Bohun went immediately to Rozlogi to wed her. However, Zagłoba, who accompanied him, spirited her away after Bohun was wounded by Mikołaj (Nicholas), one of the old Princess' sons. Instead of heading for Lubni, they headed for Czerkasy but are caught between Bohun's force and Chmielnicki's advancing army. To disguise themselves Zagłoba pounces on an old blind minstrel and a young boy and steals their clothes. At a village named Demianówka (Demianovka), Zagłoba persuades the villagers to flee to Chmielnicki's force taking himself and Helena with them. Zagłoba eventually decides the safest place is on the right bank of the Dnieper and, just as they are crossing, Bohun's Cossacks appear at the river's bank but it is too late to stop the runaways.

Prince Jeremi's army arrives at Rozlogi and Skrzetuski is reunited with Wiśniowiecki. After returning to Lubni, preparations are made to march and Lubni is abandoned to its fate. They end up marching through the forests to Czernihów (Chernigov) where Chmielnicki attempts to burn the wood. They eventually cross the Dnieper and go through the Pripet Marshes, and reach the region of revolt where they wreak revenge on the Cossacks. The Brotherhood meet to determine how to respond and eventually Maksim Krzywonos (Krivonos) agrees to lead a 60,000 army to Machnówka (Makhnivka) to fight the Prince. His son besieges the castle but the Prince's hussars eventually crush the rebels.

=== Chapters XXVIII–XLV ===
Skrzetuski is dispatched to persuade some German infantry to the Prince Jeremi's side but they refuse. On his way back he attacks an outlaw camp and finds Zagłoba amongst them; he tells Jan Helena is safe in the castle in Bar. The Polish army passes Konstantynów (Konstantinoff) and halts at Rosołowce (Rosolovtsi) where they are now joined by the German infantry fleeing from Chmielnicki. Krzywonos arrives with his forces, the battle starts with single hand-to-hand combat, and Krzywonos is eventually defeated. Rzędzian is reunited with his master.

The King dies and a disputed succession takes place. Jeremi and his army rest at the castle of Zbaraż (Zbaraj) where, after much internal struggle, the Prince announces he will submit to the commanders appointed by the Commonwealth. Bohun captures Helena at Bar and hides her with a witch, Horpyna, at Horpyna's house. Helena threatens to stab herself when Bohun speaks to her about marriage, having tried to do so when she was captured at Bar. Skrzetuski and his colleagues go out to crush marauding bands. He is forced to split his force, putting parts of it under the command of Podbipięta, Wołodyjowski, and Zagłoba. Zagłoba is captured with his men by Bohun's Cossacks after they get drunk at a peasant wedding, but they are freed by Wołodyjowski and his troops.

The four Polish officers return to Jarmolińce (Yarmolintsi) and Zagłoba reveals that he overheard during his captivity that Helena is hidden somewhere between Jampol (Yampol) and Jahorlik (Yagorlik). Wierszułł (Vershul) arrives and reveals that the Poles, under Prince Dominik Zasławski, have been ignominiously defeated. They make for Lwów (Lviv), where Prince Jeremi is elected leader of the Commonwealth forces, and continue to Zamość and afterwards to Warsaw with his wife, Princess Gryzelda (Griselda). Wołodyjowski gets into a quarrel with Charłamp over Anusia Borzobohata. Kazimierz and his brother Karol (Karl) are disputing the election, and the former is elected King. Zagłoba and Wołodyjowski also meet Bohun, travelling as an envoy, and Michał Wołodyjowski leaves him for dead in a duel.

=== XLVI–LVII ===
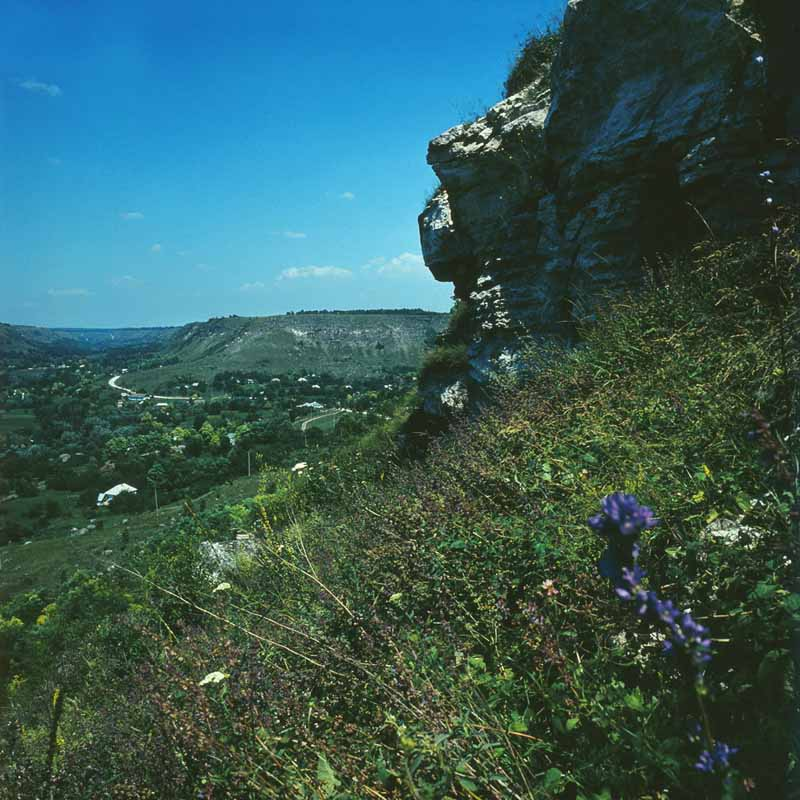
Sienkiewicz made every effort to be as accurate as possible when describing the varied geographies he presented in his works. Sienkiewicz's characterization of Horpyna's cave illustrates his detailed knowledge of the vicinity of what is today Valea Adîncă in Transnistria.

Chmielnicki's army is besieging Zamość but withdraws for peace negotiations. Zagłoba and Wołodyjowski now head to the castle and Wierszułł tells them that Skrzetuski is looking for Helena, travelling with some Armenian merchants to Jampol. A commission led by voivode Adam Kisiel is sent by the Commonwealth to negotiate with Chmielnicki, which Skrzetuski joins. The commission is rudely received by the Cossack hetman at Perejasław (Pereyaslav), despite giving him a baton from the King. Chmielnicki is pleased to see Jan and promises him 200 Cossack horsemen to accompany him to Kyiv and beyond.

An armistice is concluded but Cossack attacks continue. Skrzetuski is told during his search that Helena was murdered in a monastery with some nuns. He ends up with Prince Korecki at Korets, where he lies ill. Rzędzian reappears and tells Zagłoba that Helena is actually hidden in a ravine at the Waładynka river (Valea Adîncă), to which he was sent by Bohun after Bohun was wounded by Wołodyjowski. Wołodyjowski, Zagłoba and Rzędzian make for Waładynka, where they kill the witch and her servant Czeremis, and rescue Helena. Using Bohun's baton, they make for Zbaraż. Just before reaching it, they are pursued by Tartar horsemen. Rzędzian escapes with Helena into a wood, while the two officers make a last stand, only to be rescued by Kuszel (Kushel) and Roztworowski (Roztvorovski) with two thousand horsemen. All of the Crown forces in Ukraine are assembled at Zbaraż, including Skrzetuski, and Jeremi finally arrives. At last, battle can take place between him and Chmielnicki.

In the ensuing fighting outside Zbaraż, Zagłoba is nearly captured by the Cossack leader Burłaj (Burlai), but instead kills his pursuer. The Cossacks are defeated, but Chmielnicki convinces the Khan to keep fighting by appealing to his pride.

=== LVIII–LXIII ===
The valiant Polish force continues to hold out against the Cossacks and Tartars. Huge assault towers are burnt to the ground by a sally led by Skrzetuski; in the action the Polish soldiers are nearly taken but are saved by the hussars. Chmielnicki summons Zaćwilichowski for negotiations but his monstrous demands are rejected by Prince Jeremi, so the fighting continues. Hunger sets in, and Longin decides to steal through the enemy's lines to tell the king of the army's plight. However, he is discovered after stumbling into some Tartar horse-herders and is killed by Tartar arrows after a last stand. His naked body is hung from an assault machine, which the Poles storm to cut him down so he can be given a military funeral.

Skrzetuski goes next and, working his way through the swamp, finally makes it through the tabor to Toporów and King Jan Kazimierz, who resolves to rescue Zbaraż. Skrzetuski falls seriously ill from his ordeal, but is nursed by Rzędzian, who tells him Helena is safe. The victorious Polish army returns to Toporów and Skrzetuski and his colleagues ride out to meet the lady of Sandomierz (Sandomir), in whose carriage Helena is travelling. Returning home, the whole happy party stops for a picnic at Grabowa (Grabovo) castle, which has been burnt, and Skrzetuski and his loved one are happily cheered by the soldiers.

On their way to Tarnopol, Wołodyjowski tells Skrzetuski about the fate of Bohun, who had fallen into the prince Jarema's captivity. It turned out that when Bohun returned from the Waładynka, he attacked with a small unit the princely troops that were just marching out of Zbaraż. However, he was immediately defeated by Wołodyjowski himself. Prince Jarema then decided to present Bohun to Skrzetuski, who had suffered much because of him. Now the Cossack’s fate depended on Jan. Yet the colonel had no intention whatsoever of insulting or humiliating his enemy. He did not even agree to hand him over to Rzędzian, who asked for it very eagerly. Skrzetuski returns freedom to Bohun, who rides out into the steppe, and returns to Chmielnicki.

== Major characters ==
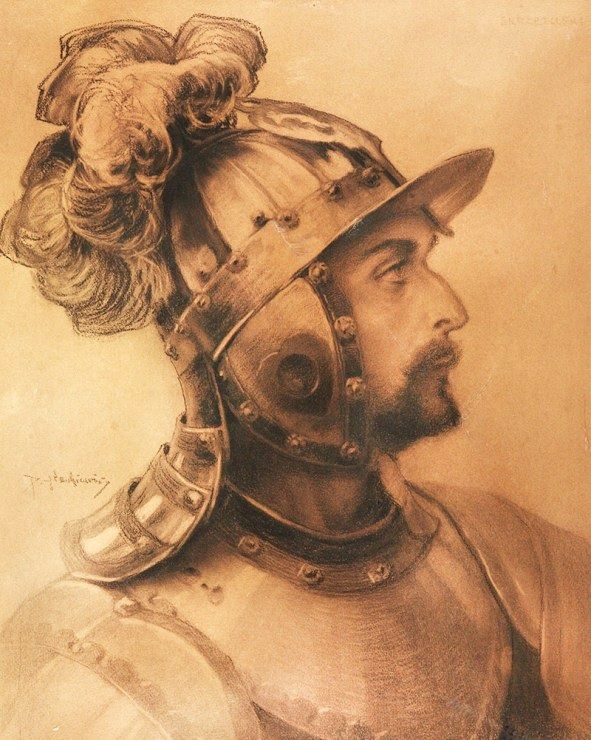
Skrzetuski by Piotr Stachiewicz

Historical figures:

- John Casimir
- Jeremi Wiśniowiecki
- Bohdan Khmelnytsky
- Adam Kisiel
- Ivan Vyhovsky
- Tugay Bey
- İslâm III Giray

Fictional characters:

- Jan Skrzetuski (based on Mikołaj Skrzetuski)
- Jan Onufry Zagłoba
- Michał Wołodyjowski (based on Jerzy Wołodyjowski)
- Longinus Podbipięta
- Yuri Bohun (based on Ivan Bohun)
- Helena Kurcewiczówna
- Rzędzian
- Horpyna

== English translations ==
The novel was initially translated by Jeremiah Curtin in 1898. Curtin was Sienkiewicz's "authorized" translator, meaning the publisher, Little, Brown and Co., paid a commission to Sienkiewicz for his endorsement because at the time, as a foreign work, it was not copyrighted in the USA. Thus, another translation by Samuel A. Binion (who translated many other books by Sienkiewicz) was published by R. F. Fenno and Co. around the same time as Curtin's, but without Sienkiewicz's endorsement. Both translations have since lapsed into the public domain.

A new translation and adaptation by W. S. Kuniczak was published in 1991 by the Copernicus Society of America, as part of a series of Polish classics in modern translation. Throughout Kuniczak's translation, many original passages of the work are deleted and replaced with the translator's own writing, such that the translation is several hundred pages longer than Polish editions and about 350 pages longer than Curtin's 1898 translation.

== Adaptations ==
A film version of the novel, With Fire and Sword, was directed by Jerzy Hoffman and released in 1999. At the time, it was the most expensive Polish film ever made (since surpassed by Quo Vadis, 2001). Although the novel is the first part of the trilogy, the film was the last part of Hoffman's version of the trilogy to be made, following The Deluge, which was filmed in 1974, and Colonel Wolodyjowski, which was filmed in 1969.

A video game based on the novel, Mount & Blade: With Fire & Sword, was published in 2011.

Invasion 1700, also known as With Fire and Sword, is a 1962 Italian-French historical epic film directed by Fernando Cerchio, based on the 1884 novel.

== See also ==
- With Fire and Sword (film)
- Mount & Blade: With Fire & Sword
- Dzikie Pola
- Polish–Lithuanian Commonwealth
- List of historical novels
- Taras Bulba
