= Crasnîi =

Crasnîi may refer to the following places in Transnistria, Moldova:

- Crasnîi Octeabri
- Crasnîi Vinogradari
