= Yuri Bohun =

Jur Bohun
- First appearance: With Fire and Sword
- Created by: Henryk Sienkiewicz
- Portrayed by: Aleksandr Domogarov

In-universe information
- Nickname: Jurko
- Gender: Male
- Title: Ataman
- Family: Unknown
- Religion: Christian
- Nationality: Ruthenian

Jur Bohun (also Yuri Bogun) is the main antagonist in the novel With Fire and Sword by Henryk Sienkiewicz. He is a famous Cossack colonel of unknown origin, and originally a friend (more like an adopted son) of the Kurcewicz family. He falls in love with Helena Kurcewiczówna and wants to marry her. However he is thwarted by his rival, Jan Skrzetuski, a Polish nobleman, who forces the matron, Princes Kurcewicz to promise him Helena's hand, with Helena's approval. Betrayed and rejected Bohun raids the Kurcewicz estate, slaughters the family, kidnaps Helena and joins the ongoing Cossack uprising. The novel revolves around the struggle between Skrzetuski and Bohun with the Khmelnytsky Uprising as historical background.

The character is based on the historical figure, Ivan Bohun.

Bohun is portrayed by Aleksandr Domogarov in 1999 Jerzy Hoffman's film With Fire and Sword.

== Character history ==
Date of Bohun's birth is unknown, as well as the origin of his parents. He grew up in Zaporizhia, from early age becoming familiar with expeditions to the Black Sea and skirmishes with Tartars. He quickly gained fame among Cossacks for his outstanding courage and became their leader (ataman). He became a friend of the Kurcewicz brothers, who often joined Cossacks on expeditions. He was treated like a member of their family. Their mother, widowed princess Kurcewicz, regarded him as her own son.

Bohun fell in love with Kurcewicz's orphaned cousin, princess Helena but she despised him since he killed a man in her presence. Her aunt, however, agreed to give Bohun Helena's hand in marriage when he promised to let her keep Rozłogi (which was Helena's dowry).

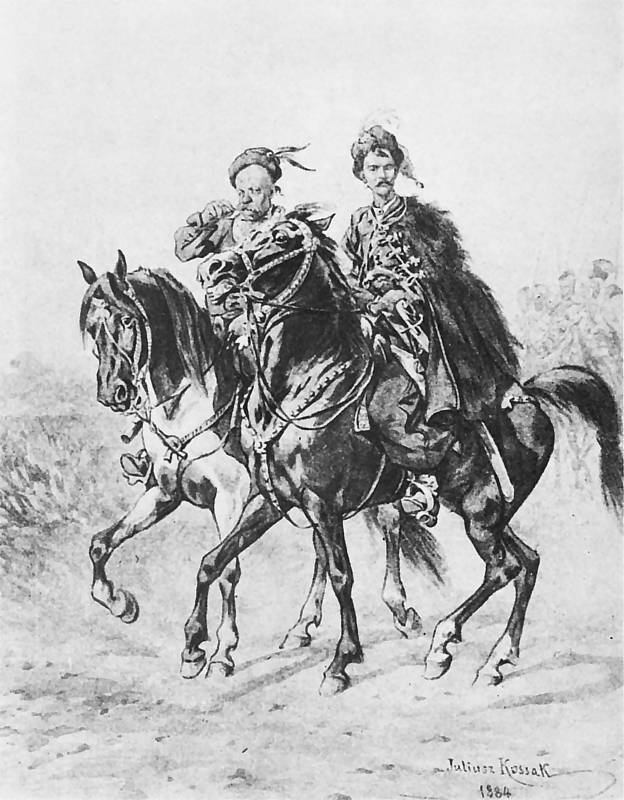
Bohun and Zagłoba by Juliusz Kossak

In 1648 Bohun served Poland as the lieutenant-colonel of the Pereiaslav regiment. At this time Helena and the Polish lieutenant Jan Skrzetuski fell in love with each other. Bohun discovered that Kurcewiczes had betrayed him and promised the girl to the Pole. In the company of Zagłoba and some Cossacks from his regiment, he rushed to Rozłogi, intending to kidnap Helena and take revenge on her family. During the fight he killed Symeon and Mikołaj, the two Kurcewicz brothers. The old princess was strangled by Bohun's Cossacks.

Helena escaped from Rozłogi with Zagłoba and Bohun with his men set off in pursuit. On his way, Bohun attacked a group of Polish troops, which was equivalent to joining the ongoing Cossack rebellion. Despite a long and desperate search, he didn't manage to find Zagłoba and Helena. Eventually he finally discovered the girl in the Bar fortress, where Zagłoba had hidden her. He captured the city and saved his beloved from the slaughter. Helena, at the very sight of him, stabbed herself with a knife. Bohun took her to Devil's Valley at the Dniester. He put her in witch Horpyna's care and left.

He was sent against Polish troops as a spy. He defeated a group led by Zagłoba and imprisoned him. However, Polish relief led by Michał Wołodyjowski soon came. Wołodyjowski rescued Zagłoba and forced Bohun to escape with Cossack survivors. Later on, when Bohun traveled as an envoy, he challenged Wołodyjowski to a duel. After a long fight, he was seriously wounded. He recovered with the help of Rzędzian, who unbeknown to Bohun was Skrzetuski's servant. He asked the boy to go to the Devil's Valley and take Helena to Kiev. Instead Rzędzian helped Zagłoba and Wołodyjowski find Helena and free her.

Shortly after the Siege of Zbarazh began. Bohun didn't manage to get there on time. He arrived a few days after the battle was over, when the peace treaty was signed. Enraged with the news, Bohun attacked the whole Polish army along with 300 men. He was taken prisoner by Wołodyjowski and his group (Sienkiewicz didn't write how Bohun was wounded). Skrzetuski, admiring Bohun's courage, set him free. Bohun then gives his final farewell to Skrzetski and Helena as he rides his horse away to join back with the Cossacks .

In the Epilogue of the novel, Bohun is said to have taken part in the Battle of Berestechko in 1651. He then became the leader of Cossacks during Khmelnytsky's absence. Although the battle was lost by Cossacks, Bohun managed to save himself and some part of Cossack army from the slaughter. He lived in rebuilt Rozłogi and fought against Poles in the following wars.

== Description ==
Bohun is a tall, strong, young man. He's black-haired and has got dark eyes.

He saw now a young hero, straight as a poplar, with splendid brunette face, and rich, dark, drooping mustache. On that face gladness burst through the pensive mood of the Ukraine, as the sun through a mist. The leader had a lofty forehead, on which his dark hair drooped as a mane above his powerful brow. An aquiline nose, dilated nostrils, and white teeth, shining at every smile, gave the face a slight expression of rapacity; but on the whole it was a model of Ukraine beauty, luxuriant, full of character and defiance.

Although Bohun is generally a villain in the novel, his character is rather ambiguous. He is very passionate and hot-tempered. As an impulsive person, he often takes risk and often acts in a foolhardy manner. He often shows the cruel and violent side of his personality - he murders Kurcewicz brothers and nearly kills Rzędzian in the heat of anger. He is also willful and arrogant, he disobeys commands and doesn't care much for the possible consequences. After falling in love with Helena, he doesn't accept her refusal, and wants to force her to marry him.

On the other hand, Bohun is a man noted for his bravery. He has no fear of death and many of his actions are simply reckless. He is a fine soldier who eagerly fights for the Cossack's freedom and always stays true to himself. He is also able to love one woman deeply and faithfully. Although Helena despises him, he respects her and is willing to do anything for her.

In the Epilogue of the novel we learn that after many years Bohun didn't change at all. As before, he wanted to stay independent and, most probably, still loved Helena.

The haughty Bogun refused every guardianship, and was ready to defend his Cossack freedom with the sword. It was said, too, that a smile never appeared on the lips of this strange man. He lived not in Lubni, but in a village which he raised from its ashes, and which was called Rozlogi.

== See also ==
- Ivan Bohun
- Zaporozhian Cossacks
