= Sielski =

Sielski (feminine: Sielska; plural: Sielscy) is a surname. Notable people with this surname include:

- Aleksander Sielski (1610–1682), Polish noble
- Margit Sielska-Reich (1900–1980), Polish-Ukrainian painter
