= Battle of Zboriv =

Battle of Zboriv (Zborow, Zborov) may refer to:

- Battle of Zboriv (1649), fought in the vicinity of Zboriv, as part of the Khmelnytsky Uprising
- Battle of Zborov (1917), fought in July, 1917, a small part of the Kerensky Offensive (the last Russian offensive in World War I)
