= Caterinovca =

Caterinovca Катеринівка
- Commune
- Location within Moldova
- Coordinates: 47°56′1″N 28°52′4″E
- Country (de jure): Moldova
- Country (de facto): Transnistria (Note: Transnistria's political status is disputed. It considers itself to be an independent state, but this is not recognised by any UN member state. The Moldovan government and the international community consider Transnistria a part of Moldova's territory.)
- Elevation: 191 m (627 ft)

Population (2004)
  - Total: 1,600
- Time zone: UTC+2 (EET)
  - Summer (DST): UTC+3 (EEST)

Caterinovca (Moldovan Cyrillic and Russian: Катериновка, romanized: Katerinovka, Ukrainian: Катеринівка, romanized: Katerynivka) is a commune in the Camenca District of Transnistria, Moldova. It is composed of two villages, Caterinovca and Sadchi (Садки). It has been administered as a part of the breakaway Transnistrian Moldovan Republic since 1990.

According to the 2004 census, the village's population was 1,609, of which 76 (4.72%) were Moldovans (Romanians), 1,454 (90.36%) Ukrainians and 59 (3.66%) Russians.
