= Podoima =

Podoima Подойма
- Commune
- Location within Moldova
- Coordinates: 47°59′53″N 28°46′36″E
- Country (de jure): Moldova
- Country (de facto): Transnistria (Note: Transnistria's political status is disputed. It considers itself to be an independent state, but this is not recognised by any UN member state. The Moldovan government and the international community consider Transnistria a part of Moldova's territory.)
- Elevation: 45 m (148 ft)

Population (2004)
  - Total: 1,780
- Time zone: UTC+2 (EET)
  - Summer (DST): UTC+3 (EEST)

Podoima (Moldovan Cyrillic, Russian, and Ukrainian: Подойма) is a commune in the Camenca District of Transnistria, Moldova. It is composed of two villages, Podoima and Podoimița (Подоймиця, Подоймица).

== History ==
Podejma, as it was known in Polish, was a private village of the Urbanowski family, administratively located in the Bracław County in the Bracław Voivodeship in the Lesser Poland Province of the Kingdom of Poland. Following the Second Partition of Poland, it was annexed by Russia. In the late 19th century, it had a population of 664.

In 1924, it became part of the Moldavian Autonomous Oblast, which was soon converted into the Moldavian Autonomous Soviet Socialist Republic, and the Moldavian Soviet Socialist Republic in 1940 during World War II. From 1941 to 1944, it was administered by Romania as part of the Transnistria Governorate.

According to the 2004 census, the population of the village was 3,808 inhabitants, of which 3,691 (96.92%) were Moldovans (Romanians), 63 (1.65%) Ukrainians and 45 (1.18%) Russians.
