= Siege of Zbarazh =

Battle fought in the Khmelnytsky Uprising

Coordinates: 49°40′00″N 25°46′40″E

- Part of the Khmelnytsky Uprising
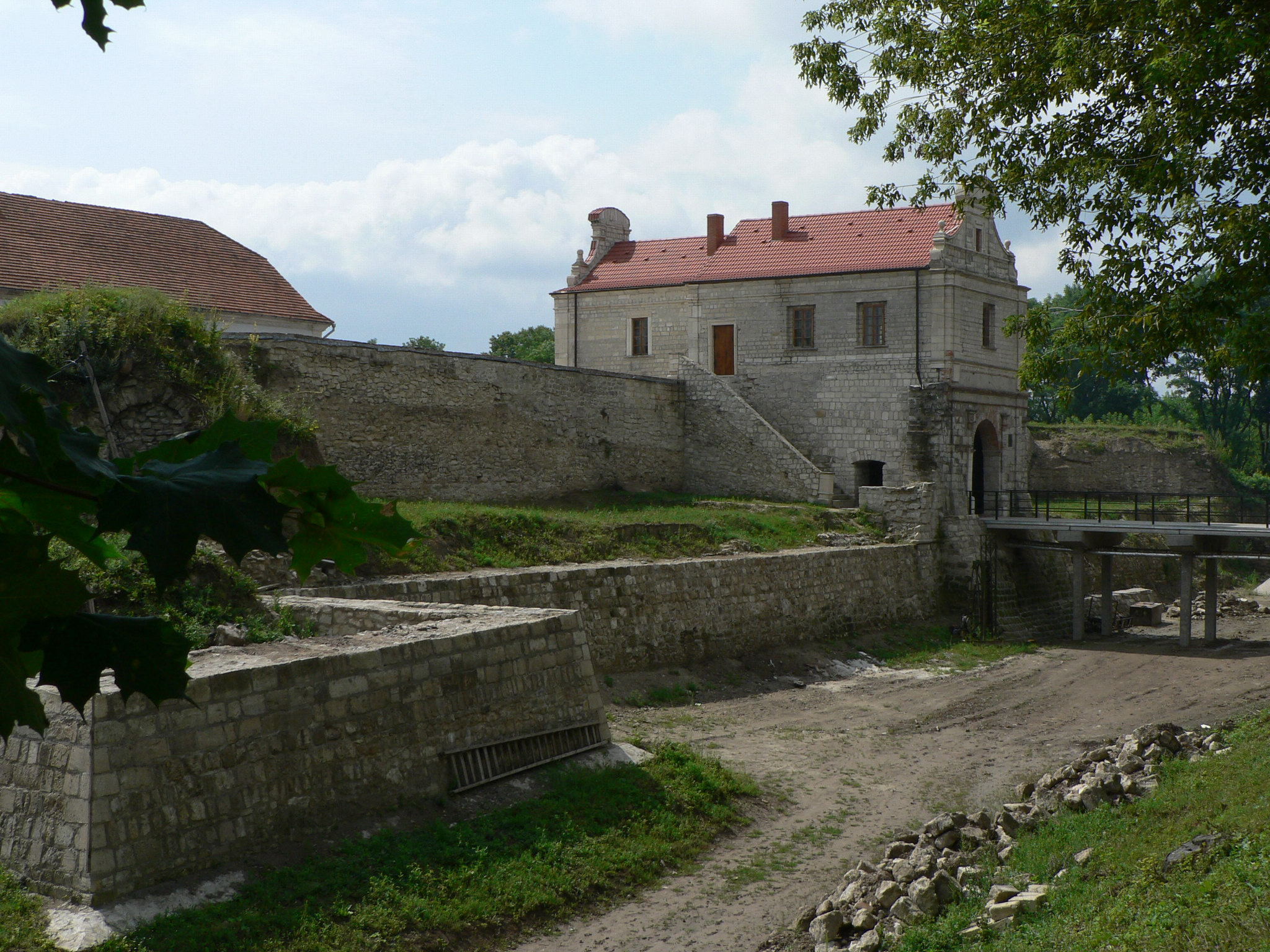
- Zbarazh Castle
Date	10 July – 22 August 1649
Location	Zbarazh, Volhynian Voivodeship, Polish–Lithuanian Commonwealth
Result	Polish–Lithuanian victory

Belligerents
Cossack Hetmanate; Crimean Khanate	Polish–Lithuanian Commonwealth

Commanders and leaders
Bohdan Khmelnytsky; Danylo Nechay; Ivan Bohun (WIA); Kindrat Burliy (WIA); Ivan Chornota †; Stanislav Morozenko †; Martyn Nebaba; İslâm III Giray	Jeremi Wiśniowiecki; Aleksander Koniecpolski; Mikołaj Ostroróg; Andrzej Firlej; Brodowski †

Strength
70,000 Zaporozhian Cossacks; 40,000 Crimean Tatars	10,000–15,000 Polish–Lithuanian infantry and defenders of the castle

Casualties and losses
8,000–18,000 killed and wounded	4,000–6,000 killed and wounded 4,000–5,000 captured

The siege of Zbarazh (Ukrainian: Облога Збаража, Битва під Збаражем, Polish: Oblężenie Zbaraża, Bitwa pod Zbarażem; 10 July – 22 August 1649) was a part of the Khmelnytsky Uprising, and occurred in and around the site of the present-day city of Zbarazh in Ukraine. The Cossack Hetmanate and Crimean Khanate combined forces against the Polish–Lithuanian Commonwealth in a siege that lasted seven weeks.

The Polish–Lithuanian forces remained under siege in Zbarazh Castle until after the conclusion of the nearby Battle of Zboriv on 15–16 August 1649 and the Treaty of Zboriv two days later.

== Background ==
In the first half of 1649, the Polish–Lithuanian Commonwealth negotiations with the rebellious Cossacks fell through, and the Polish–Lithuanian military began gathering near its borders with the insurgent-held Ukraine. While the king organized the main Polish army, and Janusz Radziwiłł commanded the Lithuanian army along the Horyn River, an army under three regimentarzs (Andrzej Firlej, Stanisław Lanckoroński and Mikołaj Ostroróg) was located in Zbarazh from 30 June, where Prince Jeremi Wiśniowiecki arrived with reinforcements on 7 July. Wiśniowiecki's arrival raised the morale of the royal army, and despite his lack of a military rank, both the common soldiers and the new regimentarz promised to heed his advice, and he was offered the official command (which he refused).

Detachments from the Castellan of Kamianiec Stanisław Lanckoroński, Starosta of Lwow Adam Hieronim Sieniawski, Starosta of Braclaw Jerzy Kalinowski, and Prince Samuel Karol Korecki, also arrived in the area.

== Opposing forces ==
Zbarazh Castle was rebuilt in the decades preceding the siege under the Netherland engineer Henryk van Peene, who finished his project in 1626. The castle's outer walls formed a square about 88 meters on each side, surrounded by an earthen wall and a moat. It was a relatively modern and resilient construction, whose major weakness was its small size, with little space for an extensive army and supplies. Built with earlier Tatar raids in mind, it was not meant to withstand a prolonged siege by a large army. The town itself had relatively poor defenses. The Polish–Lithuanian fortified camp incorporated the town defenses and the castle.

The Polish–Lithuanian forces numbered between 10,000 and 15,000, according to different sources, and Widecki notes that the lower number accounts for regular troops, whereas the higher one probably counts auxiliary troops such as armed servants and the town militia.

The Polish–Lithuanian forces were commanded officially by Andrzej Firlej. However, as noted by Polish historian Widacki, Firlej had little authority, and often took the advice of Wiśniowiecki, who might be seen as the real commander of the Polish–Lithuanian forces. As a contemporary memoir notes, Wiśniowiecki's opposition was enough to veto a plan proposed and backed by all three regimentarzs. Each of the regimentarz, as well as Wiśniowiecki, commanded a division of the troops, tasked with defending a part of the line; there were five divisions in total, with the last one commanded by chorąży Aleksander Koniecpolski.

The forces of the allied Zaporozhian Cossacks and Crimean Tatars at Zbarazh numbered around 130,000, with two thirds of those being Cossacks. Widecki notes that the number of 70,000 Cossacks given by some sources may be true in so far as it reflects the size of the seasoned, regular Cossack troops, with the difference reflecting the size of the Cossack militia and rebellious peasants. Those forces were commanded by the Cossack leader Bohdan Khmelnytsky and the Tatar khan İslâm III Giray.

== Siege ==
On 7 July first skirmishes began, and by 10 July the advanced forces of the Cossacks and Tatars arrived at Zbarzah, killing or taking prisoner several thousands of auxiliary Polish–Lithuanian troops which were still gathering supplies in the area, and failed to retreat to the main camp before being overrun. The first skirmish near the main camp, however, resulted in a Polish–Lithuanian victory, as the Cossack and Tatar forces were thrown back, which raised the defenders' morale.

The defenders defeated the attacker main force assaults on 11, 13, 14, 16 and 17 July. After the failure of those early assaults, the Cossack and Tatar army began a regular siege, constructing their own field fortifications, and intensifying the artillery bombardment of the Polish–Lithuanian camp. On 23 July a short ceasefire occurred, as the sides attempted negotiations, eventually futile; other attempts at negotiations took place on 26 and 28 July. On 16 and 23 July there were assaults on the town, where the only well was located, and both were defeated. The Cossacks also tried to destroy a nearby dam to flood the town, but the dam was also successfully defended.

Throughout the engagement, the Polish–Lithuanian forces constructed additional field fortifications, and retreated behind them, to reduce the length of the walls they would have to defend; while retreating to the fourth line of defences on 30 July they defeated another enemy assault.

As the defenders were running low on supplies, about 4,000 starving auxiliaries (servants) requested to leave the city; they were granted permission, but soon after they were outside the town walls they were taken captive by the Tatars; some were taken into jasyr while others were executed on the spot. Despite that, others wanted to leave the town, but prince Wiśniowiecki promised to feed them rather than risk another massacre. The besieged also tried to send messages to the king asking for reinforcements, and in early August a volunteer messenger, Mikołaj Skrzetuski, managed to sneak past the besiegers and reached the king around 6 or 7 August; he was an inspiration for the fictional character Jan Skrzetuski in Henryk Sienkiewicz's The Trilogy. In the meantime, the Cossacks and Tatars tried to extend their fortifications closer to the defenders' line; they launched their last large assault on 6 August, but were defeated once more. Soon afterward the Cossacks and Tatars sent off a large chunk of their forces under Bohdan Khmelnytsky to intercept the nearing royal reinforcements under John II Casimir at Zboriv; the resulting battle ended in the Treaty of Zboriv of 17 August. In the meantime, at Zbarazh, the besiegers finished digging a tunnel into the Polish–Lithuanian camp around 16 August, but it was destroyed by the defenders.

Around 20 August, the besieged launched a small counterattack, leaving the camp and raiding the enemy; soon afterward, on 21 August, Khmelnytsky returned, and despite having signed the peace treaty, he attempted a final assault on Zbarazh.

== Aftermath ==
The ceasefire took hold on the next day. The Cossacks demanded a ransom, and at the same time sold the besieged some badly needed supplies; in the end a ransom of 40,000 talars was paid, the Cossack and Tatar field fortifications were mostly abandoned by the 23rd, and by the 25th the besieging army left the vicinity. The Polish–Lithuanian army left on the evening of that day, reaching Tarnopol on the 28th.

The Polish–Lithuanian losses at Zbarazh were about 2,000 regular soldiers and 4,000 auxiliaries; about half of the losses were a result of diseases.

The Ukrainian–Crimean losses at Zbarazh were between 8,000 and 18,000. Stanislav-Nestor Morozenko (Colonel of Korsun) was killed, and Ivan Bohun was seriously wounded.
