= Valea Adîncă =

Valea Adîncă Валя Адынкэ
- Commune
- Location within Moldova
- Coordinates: 48°0′23″N 28°50′35″E
- Country (de jure): Moldova
- Country (de facto): Transnistria (Note: Transnistria's political status is disputed. It considers itself to be an independent state, but this is not recognised by any UN member state. The Moldovan government and the international community consider Transnistria a part of Moldova's territory.)
- Elevation: 85 m (279 ft)

Population (1979)
  - Total: 2,200
- Time zone: UTC+2 (EET)
  - Summer (DST): UTC+3 (EEST)

Valea Adîncă (Moldovan Cyrillic: Валя Адынкэ; Russian: Валя-Адынка, romanized: Valya-Adynka; Ukrainian: Валя-Адинке, romanized: Valya-Adynke, Волядинка, Volyadynka; Polish: Waładynka) is a commune in Camenca District, in the northern part of Transnistria, Moldova. The name in Romanian means "deep valley". It is composed of two villages, Constantinovca and Valea Adîncă.

Nobel Prize laureate Henryk Sienkiewicz situated the Devil's Gorge where the witch Horpyna, a well-known fictional character from the novel With Fire and Sword, lived in this vicinity along the Dniester river. It was rendered under the Polish spelling of Waładynka.

Valea Adîncă is also the site of the Church of the Blessed Virgin's Protection, a Russian Orthodox church.

According to the 2004 census, the village's population was 608, of which 44 (7.23%) were Moldovans (Romanians), 540 (88.81%) were Ukrainians and 21 (3.45%) were Russians.
