= Cuzmin =

Cuzmin Кузьмин (Russian) Кузьмін (Ukrainian)
- Commune
- Location within Moldova
- Coordinates: 48°5′28″N 28°37′36″E
- Country (de jure): Moldova
- Country (de facto): Transnistria (Note: Transnistria's political status is disputed. It considers itself to be an independent state, but this is not recognised by any UN member state. The Moldovan government and the international community consider Transnistria a part of Moldova's territory.)
- Administraive sub-unit: Camenca District
- Elevation: 41 m (135 ft)
- Time zone: UTC+2 (EET)
  - Summer (DST): UTC+3 (EEST)

Cuzmin (Moldovan Cyrillic: Кузмин, Russian: Кузьмин, romanized: Kuz'min, Ukrainian: Кузьмін, romanized: Kuz'min, Polish: Kuźmin) is a commune in the Camenca sub-district of Transnistria, Moldova. It is composed of two villages, Cuzmin and Voitovca (Війтівка, Войтовка). It has since 1990 been administered as a part of the breakaway Pridnestrovian Moldavian Republic.

== History ==
Kuźmin, as it was known in Polish, was a private village of the Lubomirski family, administratively located in the Bracław County in the Bracław Voivodeship in the Lesser Poland Province of the Kingdom of Poland. Following the Second Partition of Poland, it was annexed by Russia.

In 1924, it became part of the Moldavian Autonomous Oblast, which was soon converted into the Moldavian Autonomous Soviet Socialist Republic, and the Moldavian Soviet Socialist Republic in 1940 during World War II. From 1941 to 1944, it was administered by Romania as part of the Transnistria Governorate.

According to the 2004 census, the village's population was 1,054, of which 88 (8.34%) were Moldovans (Romanians), 929 (88.14%) Ukrainians and 30 (2.84%) Russians.
