= Battle of Zboriv (1649) =

1649 battle during the Khmelnytsky Uprising

- Part of the Khmelnytsky Uprising
- The Battle of Zboriv (1649) on the French painting by Jean-Pierre Norblin de La Gourdaine in 1780
Date	15–16 August 1649
Location	Zboriv, Ruthenian Voivodeship, Polish–Lithuanian Commonwealth
Result	See § Aftermath: Treaty of Zboriv
Territorial changes	Formation of the Cossack Hetmanate

Belligerents
Cossack Hetmanate; Crimean Khanate	Polish–Lithuanian Commonwealth

Commanders and leaders
Bohdan Khmelnytsky; Tymofiy Khmelnytsky; Fylon Dzhalaliy; Danylo Nechay; Ivan Sirko; Martyn Nebaba; Mykhailo Hromyka; İslâm III Giray	John II Casimir

Strength
30,000 Zaporozhian Cossacks; 10,000–20,000 Crimean Tatars	35,000–40,000 Polish–Lithuanian hussars, cavalry and infantry

Casualties and losses
10,000 killed 10,000 wounded	6,000–7,000 killed and wounded

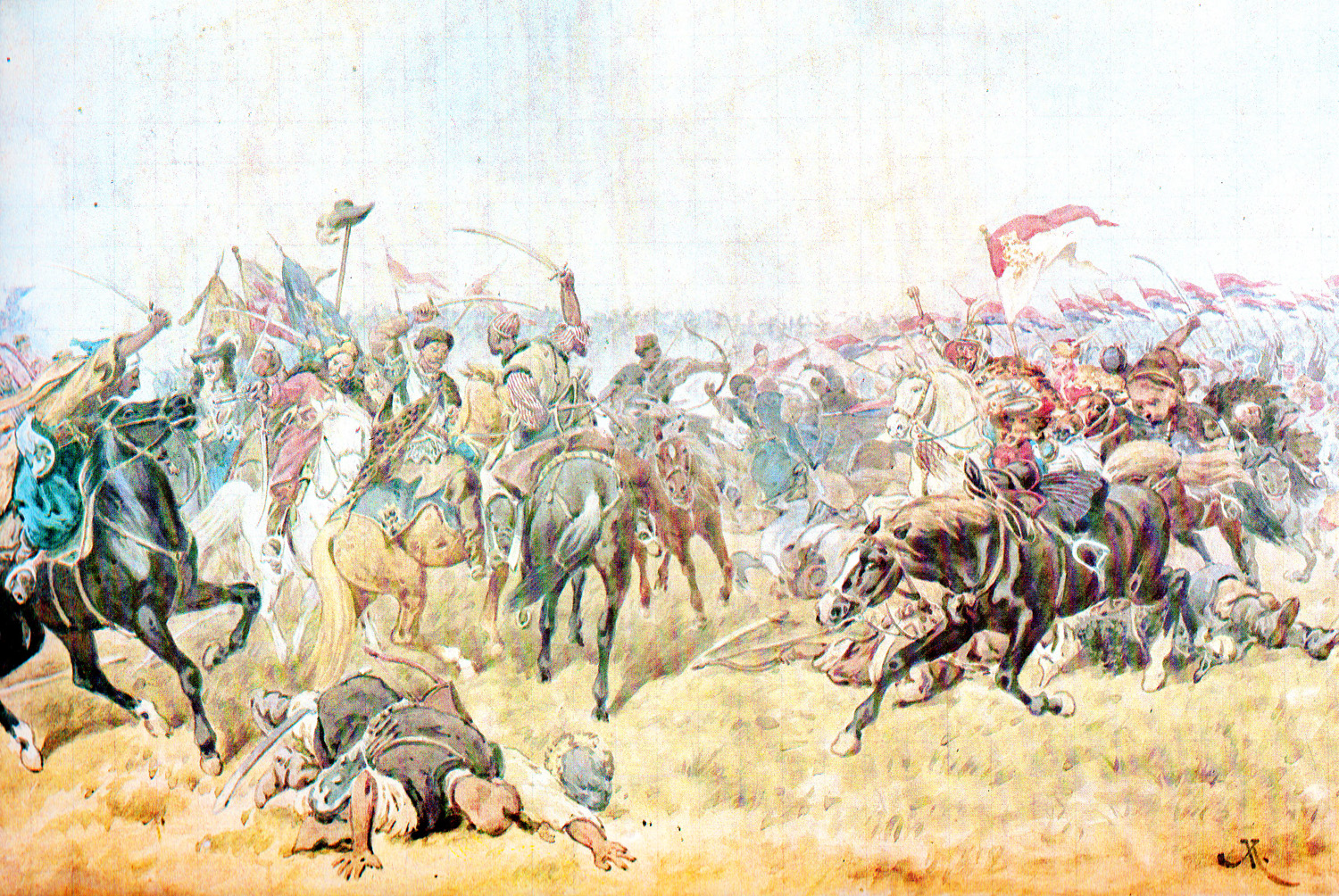
The Battle of Zboriv (1649). Painting by Juliusz Kossak in 1897

The Battle of Zboriv (Ukrainian: Битва під Зборовом, Polish: Bitwa pod Zborowem; 15–16 August 1649) was a significant battle fought as part of the Khmelnytsky Uprising, in which the Cossack Hetmanate and Crimean Khanate defeated the Polish–Lithuanian Commonwealth. Occurring near the city of Zboriv on the Strypa River in Ukraine, forces of the Zaporozhian Cossacks and Crimean Tatars under the command of Hetman Bohdan Khmelnytsky attacked and Crown's forces under the command of the Polish King John II Casimir.

The Polish King John II Casimir and the main Crown Army left Warsaw on 23 June 1649 and had made it to Toporiv in the final days of July 1649 when Mikołaj Skrzetuski informed the Polish King John II Casimir of the desperate situation at Zbarazh. The Polish King John II Casimir made it to within a half-mile of Zboriv on 13 August 1649.

== Battle ==
On 9 August 1649, Bohdan Khmelnytsky had redeployed his main forces from Zbarazh to Staryi Zbarazh to the west, where the terrain hid them from the Poles, and he used deception to prevent the besieged from noticing. The Horde, followed by the Cossack Hetmanate, advanced toward the royal camp during the night of 15 August.

The Crown forces were surprised during the rainy and foggy day while they crossed the Strypa River. The Horde split into two parts and attacked from the front and the back, but the king rallied his army to repel the attack and the Crimean Tatars retreated by nightfall.

The night brought a council of war on the Polish side and two letters from the king, one for the Khan İslâm III Giray and one for Hetman Bohdan Khmelnytsky. The letter to the khan "reminded the khan of the favor that he had enjoyed from the Poles in his youth, while sojourning as a captive, invited the khan to a renewal of their old friendship, receiving money for past, present, and future years." The letter to Khmelnytsky commanded him to "abandon all hostile actions and retreat ten miles from our army, and send us your envoys – what you desire from us and from the Commonwealth."

The next day brought more attacks from the Ukrainian Cossacks and the Tatars on two fronts, but then, a letter from the Khan İslâm III Giray and Hetman Bohdan Khmelnytsky arrived. The khan was prepared to negotiate if there was "satisfaction of the Cossacks, payment of the suspended tribute, a substantial consideration, above the tribute, as well as permission for the Horde to take captives on its way back."

== Aftermath ==
On 18 August 1649, the Treaty of Zboriv was agreed upon by Bohdan Khmelnytsky and Lord Commissioners Jerzy Ossoliński, Lord Crown Chancellor, Kazimierz Leon Sapieha, Lord Chancellor of the Grand Duchy of Lithuania Krzysztof Koniecpolski, Lord Palatine of Belz, Stanisław Witowski, Lord of Sandomierz, and Adam Kysil, Lord Palatine of Kyiv. "It was drafted not in the form of a treaty, but as a unilateral royal manifesto, at the request and intervention of the Crimean Khan."

== Result ==
Some historians such as Oleinik and Gerasimov consider the battle a Cossack victory. However, others consider the battle inconclusive or to not have been a Cossack victory.
