= Rotari, Transnistria =

Rotari Ротарь
- Commune
- Location within Moldova
- Coordinates: 48°6′13″N 28°48′38″E
- Country (de jure): Moldova
- Country (de facto): Transnistria (Note: Transnistria's political status is disputed. It considers itself to be an independent state, but this is not recognised by any UN member state. The Moldovan government and the international community consider Transnistria a part of Moldova's territory.)
- Elevation: 221 m (725 ft)

Population (1979)
  - Total: 850
- Time zone: UTC+2 (EET)
  - Summer (DST): UTC+3 (EEST)

Rotari (Moldovan Cyrillic and Russian: Ротарь, romanized: Rotar'; Ukrainian: Ротар, romanized: Rotar) is a commune in the Camenca District of Transnistria, Moldova. It is composed of three villages: Bodeni (Бодани, Боданы), Rotari and Socolovca (Соколівка, Соколовка). It has since 1990 been administered as a part of the breakaway Pridnestrovian Moldavian Republic. According to the 2004 census, the population of the village was 581 inhabitants, of which 437 (75.21%) Moldovans (Romanians), 109 (18.76%) Ukrainians and 31 (5.33%) Russians.
