= Rzędzian =

- The Trilogy character
- First appearance: With Fire and Sword
- Last appearance: The Deluge
- Created by: Henryk Sienkiewicz
- Portrayed by: Wojciech Malajkat

In-universe information
- Gender: Male
- Religion: Christian
- Nationality: Polish

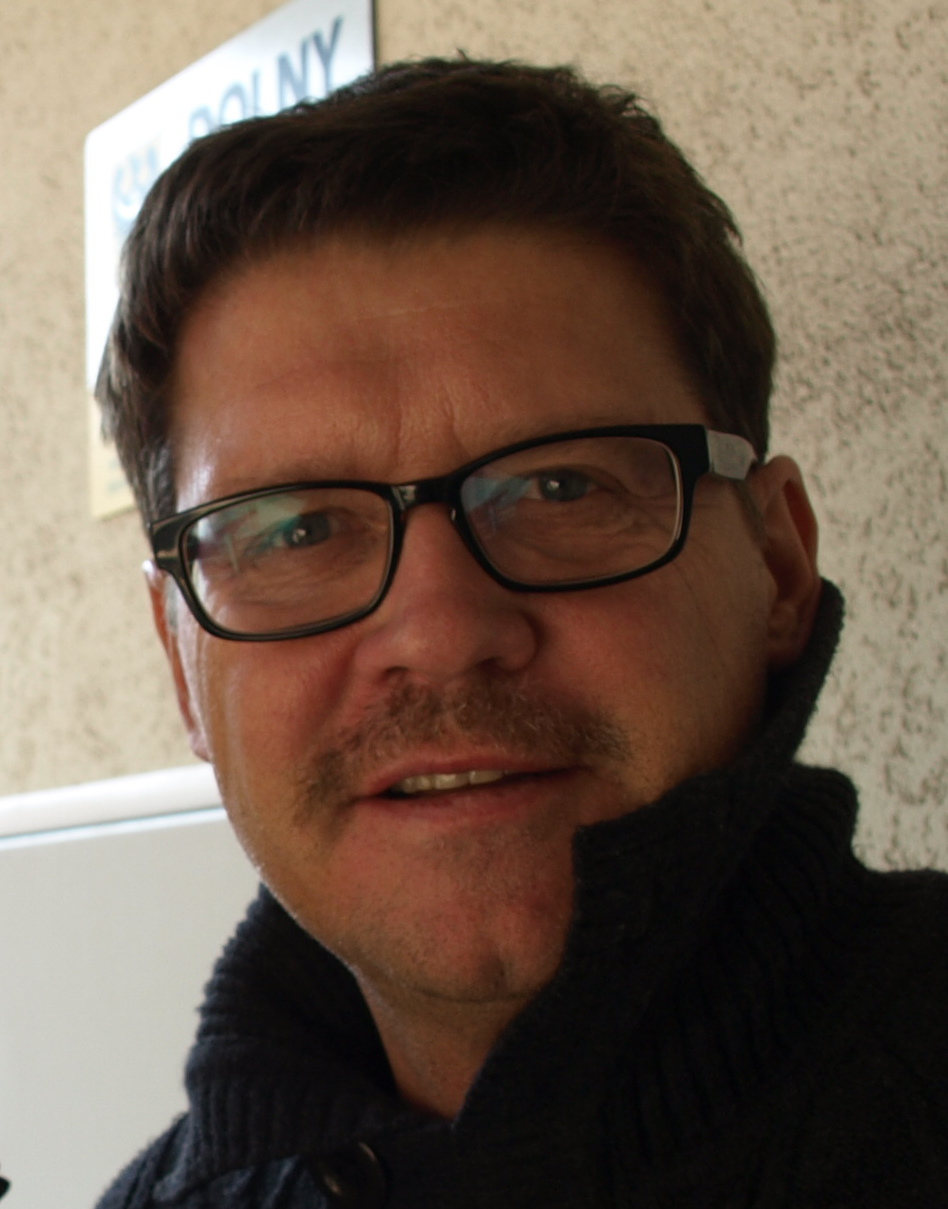
Wojciech Malajkat, actor

Rzędzian is a fictional character created by Henryk Sienkiewicz. He appears as the secondary character in With Fire and Sword and in The Deluge. He is a poor Polish nobleman who serves Jan Skrzetuski. He's cunning and greedy but always loyal to his master. He helps to free Helena Kurcewiczówna from Bohun. His parents and 91-year-old grandfather live in Rzędziany.

In The Deluge he is a wealthy nobleman and starosta of Wąsocze.

In Jerzy Hoffman's film Rzędzian is portrayed by Wojciech Malajkat.
