= Camenca District =

Coordinates: 48°00′N 28°43′E

Camenca
- district
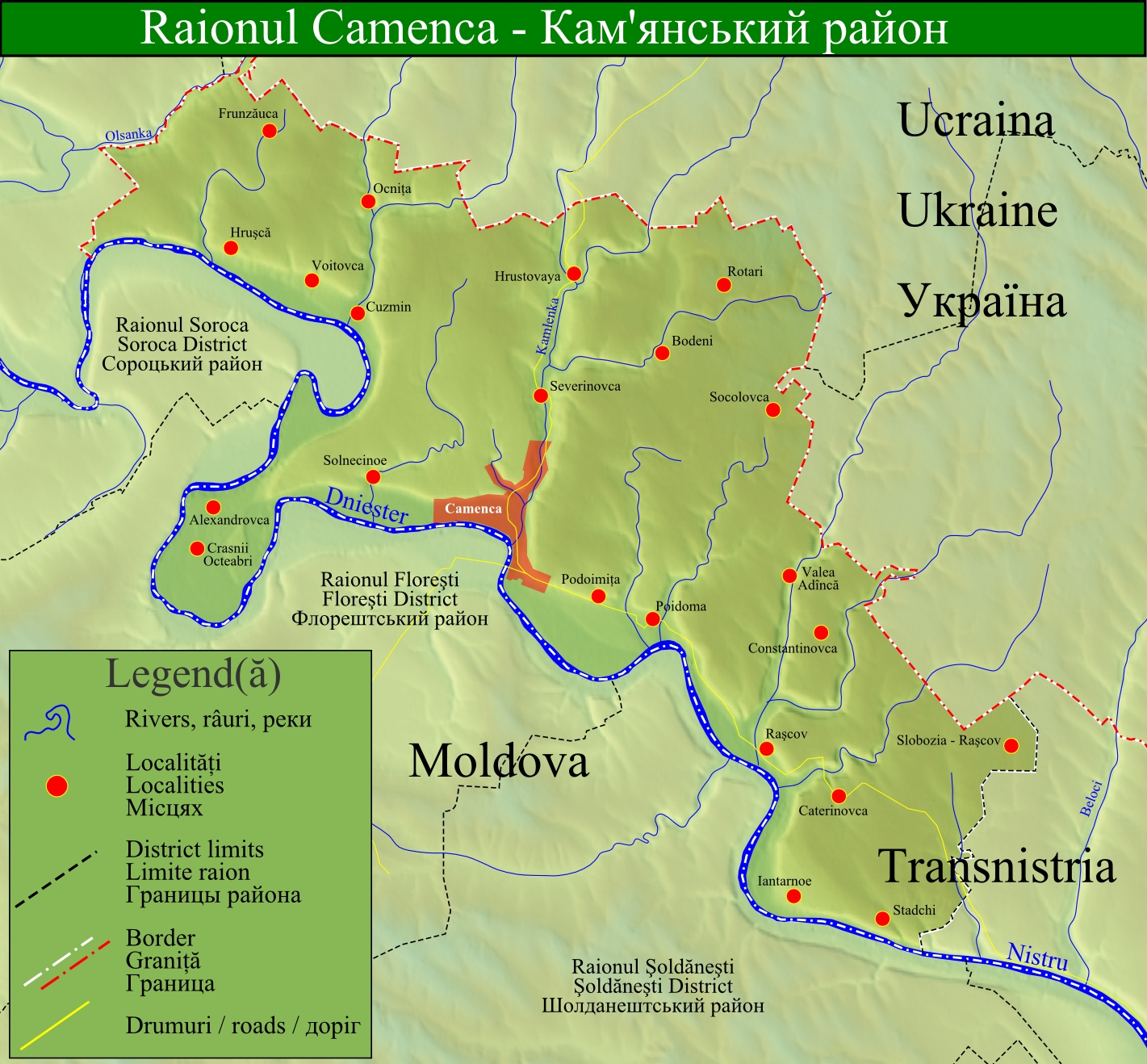
- Country: Moldova
- self-proclaimed state: Transnistria
- Administrative center: Camenca

Government
  - Heads of the State Administration of the Camenca District and the Camenca City: Sergey Sokirka

Area
  - Total: 434.5 km^{2} (167.8 sq mi)

Population (2015)
  - Total: 21,000
- Time zone: UTC+2 (EET)
  - Summer (DST): UTC+3 (EEST)

Camenca District (Romanian: Raionul Camenca, Moldovan Cyrillic: Районул Каменка; Russian: Каменский район, romanized: Kamensky rayon; Ukrainian: Кам'янський район, romanized: Kam"yans'kyy rayon) is a district of Transnistria, a breakaway republic which is internationally recognized as part of Moldova. Its seat is the town of Camenca. The district contains this town and twelve communes (a total of 23 localities, including the small villages and hamlets):

Camenca

Solnecinoe

Caterinovca Sadchi Crasnîi Octeabri Alexandrovca Cuzmin Voitovca Hristovaia	Hrușca Frunzăuca Ocnița Podoima Podoimița Rașcov Iantarnoe	Rotari Bodeni Socolovca Severinovca Slobozia-Rașcov Valea Adîncă Constantinovca

Camenca is located along the river Dniester. It is the northernmost sub-district of Transnistria. According to the 2004 Transnistrian census, the population of the sub-district is 27,284 people, including 13,034 (47.77%) Moldovans, 11,610 (42.55%) Ukrainians, 1,880 (6.89%) Russians, 43 (0.16%) Gagauzians, 59 (0.22%) Bulgarians, 9 (0.03%) Romas, 10 (0.04%) Jews, 447 (1.64%) Poles, 85 (0.31%) Belarusians, 26 (0.10%) Germans, 16 (0.06%) Armenians, and 51 (0.19%) others.

The sub-district is home to the Dniester Sanatorium, the oldest health resort in Transnistria.

In 2001, election officials for the Transnistrian presidential election announced that sitting president Igor Smirnov received 103.6 percent of the vote in this region.

== List of heads of the state administration of the Camenca District and the town of Camenca ==
- Vladimir Karaush (? - 2012)
- Pyotr Vasilyevich Mustya (25 January 2012 - 25 April 2014)
- Natalya Viktorovna Isakova (25 April 2014 - - 4 June 2014)
- Sergey Andreevich Sokirka (4 June 2014 - )
