= Helena Kurcewiczówna =

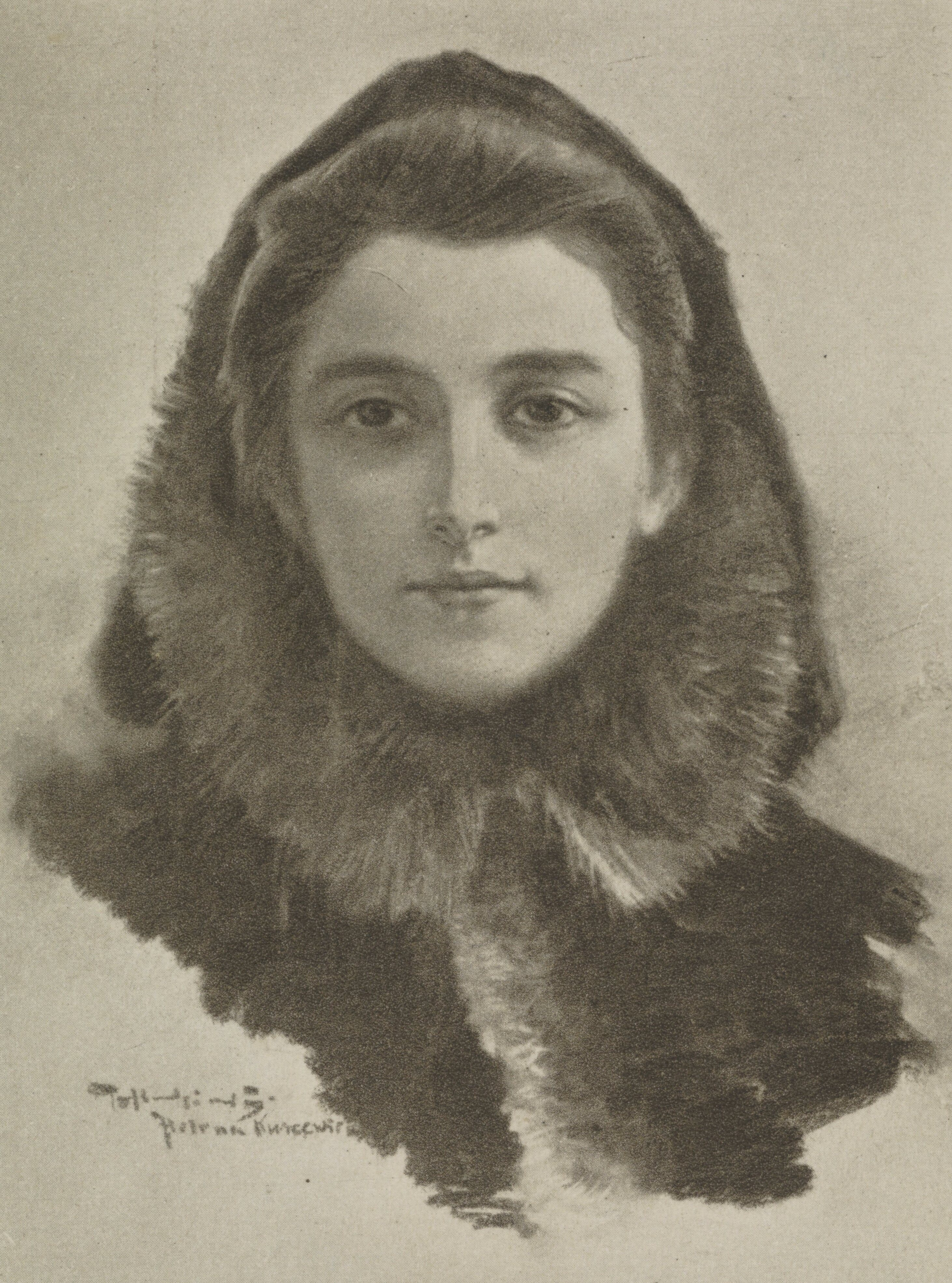
- Portrait of Helena by Piotr Stachiewicz
- First appearance: With Fire and Sword
- Last appearance: Colonel Wolodyjowski
- Created by: Henryk Sienkiewicz
- Portrayed by: Izabella Scorupco

In-universe information
- Nickname: Halszka
- Gender: Female
- Title: Princess
- Family: Wasyl Kurcewicz (father) unknown mother
- Spouse: Jan Skrzetuski
- Children: 12 sons and one daughter (born in 1672)
- Relatives: Princes Kurcewicz (aunt) Konstantyn Kurcewicz (uncle) Wasyl, Symeon, Jur, Andrzej, Mikołaj (cousins)
- Religion: Christian
- Nationality: Ruthenian

Helena Kurcewicz (full name: Helena Kurcewiczówna-Bułyha, later Skrzetuska) is a fictional character appearing in the novel With Fire and Sword by Henryk Sienkiewicz as the main female protagonist. She is also mentioned in The Deluge and in Colonel Wolodyjowski.

Helena is a beautiful orphaned princess living with her aunt and cousins in Rozłogi. Jan Skrzetuski falls in love with her and vies for her hand against the Cossack colonel Bohun to whom she was promised.

In the 1999 film, she is portrayed by Izabella Scorupco.

== Story ==
Helena was born in 1630. Her mother died in childbirth. Her father, prince Wasyl Kurcewicz Bułyha, was the master of Rozłogi and served prince Michał Wiśniowiecki. In 1634, he was charged of treason and forced to leave the country. Since then nobody heard of him, he probably soon died. Few years later he was cleared of the charge.

Helena was raised by her uncle, Konstantyn. She grew in Rozłogi with her five cousins. After Konstantyn's death, his wife looked after Helena. As it turned out, she cared more for Wasyl's fortune than for the young orphan. Helena soon became completely dominated by her aunt who regarded herself the mistress of Rozłogi, even though Helena was its legal owner. In the meantime the old princess' sons became friends with Bohun. The young Cossack fell in love with Helena but she didn't return his feelings. She was afraid of his cruelty and quick temper since he once killed a man in her presence. Bohun asked the Kurcewiczs for Helena's hand in marriage, promising to waive the right to Helena's dowry (Rozłogi). Driven by her greed, the widow accepted his proposal.

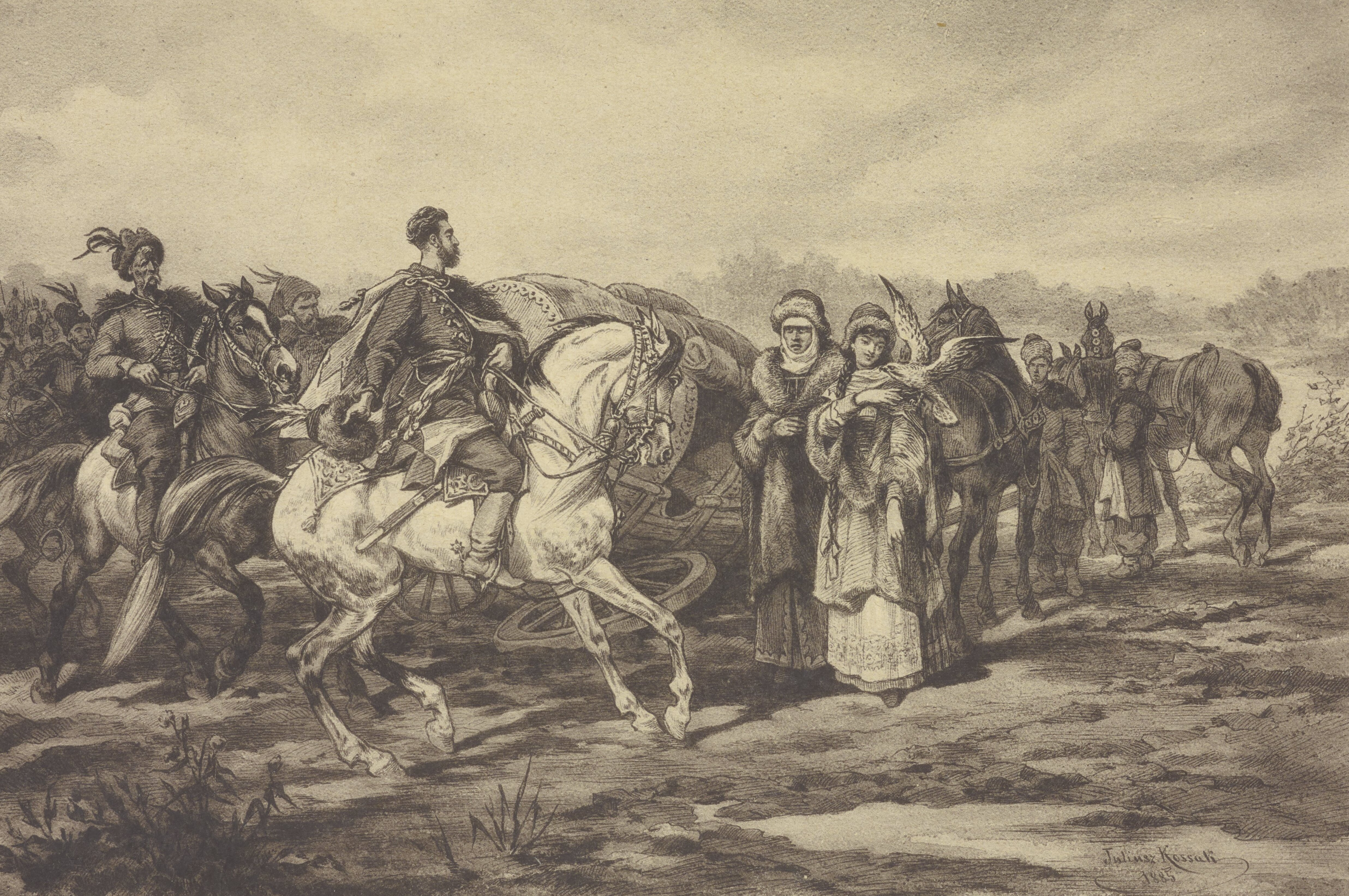
Helena and the princess meeting Skrzetuski, by Juliusz Kossak

In 1648, Helena met Polish lieutenant Jan Skrzetuski and they fell in love with each other. Skrzetuski threatened the Kurcewiczs and forced them to promise Helena's hand to him. Bohun soon discovered the old princess' betrayal. In the company of Onufry Zagłoba, he rushed to Rozłogi, intending to take revenge. During the fight, the widow and her two sons were killed. Zagłoba, seeing Bohun's cruelty, decided to save Helena from him. They managed to escape from Rozłogi but Bohun almost immediately set off in pursuit of them.

For many weeks Zagłoba and Helena wandered the country at war. They finally managed to get to Bar, where Helena was supposed to be safe from pursuit. Bar, however, was soon captured by Cossacks led by Bohun. At the sight of him, Helena stabbed herself with a knife. Bohun took the wounded girl to the ravine on the river Dniester in order to hide her. He put Helena in the Devil's Valley, in the care of his friend - witch Horpyna and left to the war. Thanks to information from Rzędzian, Skrzetuski's friends (Zagłoba, Wołodyjowski and Rzędzian) found Helena and freed her. On their way back they had to divide into two groups because of Tartars' attack. Rzędzian and Helena escaped to Zamość. After the Siege of Zbarazh and signing the treaty with Cossacks, Helena finally reunited with her beloved Skrzetuski. They soon went to Lviv to get married.

In next parts of the Trilogy ("The Deluge" and "Colonel Wolodyjowski") Helena is mentioned sporadically. She is a happy wife and mother. She has twelve sons and in 1672 her first daughter was born.

== Description ==
Helena is described as an extraordinarily beautiful woman. She has dark eyes and long black hair, usually in two braids. She makes a big impression on many men. She is loved by Bohun and Skrzetuski, even Wołodyjowski becomes slightly infatuated with her. In "The Deluge" she is well known for her beauty, enough to make Bogusław Radziwiłł plan to abduct her.

He was confused also because there looked upon him from under a marten-skin hood eyes such as he had never seen in his life,—black, satinlike, liquid, full of life and fire,— near which the eyes of Anusia Borzobogata would be as a tallow candle before a torch. Above those eyes dark velvety brows were defined in two delicate arches; her blushing face bloomed like the most beautiful flower, and through her slightly opened lips of raspberry hue were seen teeth like pearls, and from under her hood flowed out rich dark tresses.

While escaping from Bohun's pursuit, she was forced to having her braids cut in order to disguise as a man.

At the beginning of the novel, Helena is shy and dominated by her aunt. In spite of being surrounded by crude people since childhood, she is good-natured and sensitive. She has a strong, trusting faith in God. She quickly falls in love with Skrzetuski and is sure of her feelings for him. As a noblewoman, she is brave and very proud. She treasures her honor above all else, she is even ready to commit a suicide to avoid disgrace. She deeply loves Skrzetuski and is faithful to him.
