= Mikołaj Skrzetuski =

Nobleman from Greater Poland

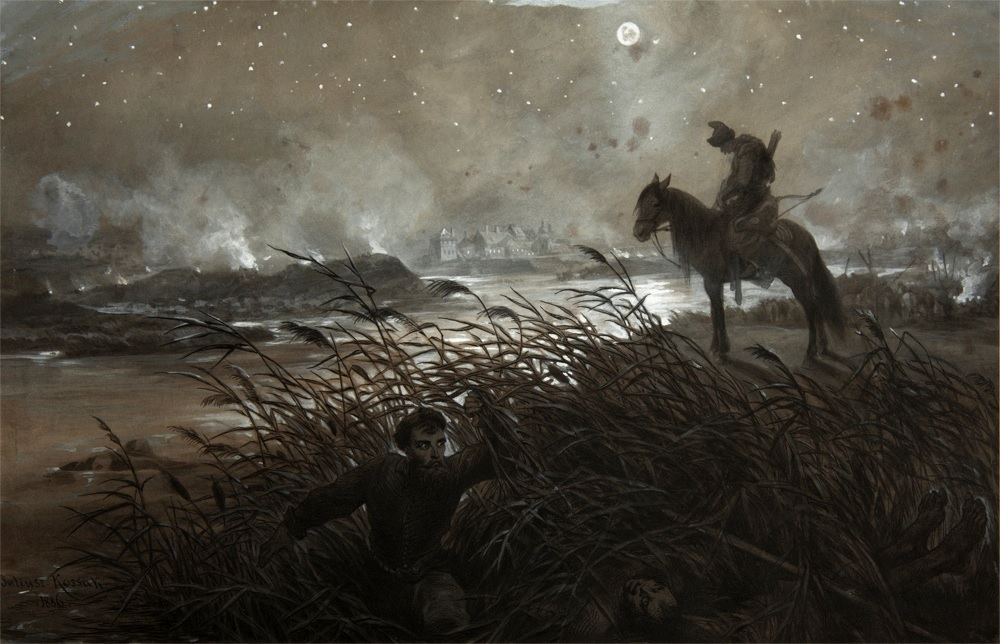
- Juliusz Kossak, Skrzetuski getting through to the king (1889)

- Coat of arms
- Born: around 1610; Rożnowo
- Died: 1673
- Buried: Poznań

Mikołaj Skrzetuski of the Jastrzębiec coat of arms (born around 1610, died 1673) was a nobleman from Greater Poland, a colonel, and the prototype of Jan Skrzetuski, a character in Henryk Sienkiewicz's novel With Fire and Sword. He was a cavalry soldier who gained fame in battles but also got into conflict with the law. He became known in history for his escape from the besieged Zbarazh and delivering a letter to King John II Casimir Vasa.

== Early life ==
Skrzetuski came from a poor noble family from Rożnowo near Poznań, bearing the Jastrzębiec coat of arms. He was the son of Jan and Katarzyna Szczutowski. After Jan's death, his widow married a nobleman named Mikołaj Kłodzyński.

Mikołaj Skrzetuski inherited a part of the Rożnówo village near Oborniki from his father, but he gave it to his sister, Marianna Poniatowska, and as a poor nobleman, he enlisted with his relatives in the ranks of the army in Ukraine. The first mention of Skrzetuski, dated 30 November 1634, comes from Lviv city records. This mention suggests that he joined the army through relatives from the Belz Voivodeship. His relatives lived in the vicinity of Belz, a small town between Lviv and Zamość. The Red Ruthenia became his second homeland. In the past, he found refuge both in Dołhobyczów and with his sister in the Poznań region.

He led a wandering life, participating in wars, spending his free time with his sister in Greater Poland or with relatives near Belz. After his death, he was buried in the church of the Discalced Carmelites in Poznań. It is assumed that he died before 24 October 1673, as on that day Skrzetuski's will (drawn up by him in 1671) was brought to the city of Poznań.

== Military career ==
After the outbreak of the Khmelnytsky Uprising, Skrzetuski served in the armoured companion under the command of rittmaster Marek Gdeszyński; he was his right-hand man. In 1649, he took part in the siege of Zbarazh. Just after a few days, the defenders began to lack food and drinking water (the Cossacks were throwing the bodies of the fallen into the water). The defenders had no illusions about the possibility of long-lasting defense, so they decided to inform the king about their situation and ask for help. Several people were sent to deliver letters written in French to the king, sewn into their clothes. They were captured; one of them was beheaded, the other had their eyes gouged out and their hands cut off. Despite this, Skrzetuski volunteered and, disguised as a peasant, escaped from the besieged Zbarazh. (Note: Independently of Skrzetuski, Krzysztof Stapkowski successfully broke through from Zbarazh.) The date of leaving the camp is unknown, (Note: According to Śledziński (2005, p. 113), Skrzetuski left Zbarazh on the night of August 2 to 3.) as well as the route he took. Skrzetuski had to travel about 46 kilometers before reaching the king. On August 7, he reached John II Casimir Vasa. (Note: According to Śledziński (2005, p. 97), Skrzetuski reached the king on the evening of August 6.) Skrzetuski achieved this feat thanks to his experience, physical condition, knowledge of the Ruthenian language, and Cossack customs. He informed the king that the defenders only had enough food for six days.

The Chancellor rewarded Skrzetuski with a horse with a bridle, 100 ducats, and clothes. The king also promised him one of the nearest vacancies. He probably meant some county office, a small crown land, or a starostwo, but Skrzetuski never sought it, and there is no indication that the promised reward ever reached him. Thanks to his feat, Skrzetuski went down in history.

Rittmaster Marek Gdeszyński was shot on 15 August 1649, and died shortly afterward. After his death, the companion ceased to exist. Skrzetuski became a commander at a lower level – it was the lesser-known "command over Wołocha". In 1651, Skrzetuski probably fought at Berestechko. On May 29, a month before the battle, he was sent on reconnaissance and captured five Cossacks, who testified that Chmielnicki had been in Zolochiv the previous day. Then there is no information about Skrzetuski for eight years. Wiesław Majewski suggests that between 1652 and 1657, he served as a lieutenant of cavalry in wars against the Cossacks, Tatars, Moscow, and Swedes.

The next mention comes from 1660 when Stefan Czarniecki's division returned from a successful overseas expedition, during which they supported their Danish ally. Skrzetuski was named a lieutenant of the light (Tatar) company of the starosta of Osiek, Adam Uriel Czarnkowski. He commanded this unit during wars with the Russian Empire and the Tatars under the command of Stefan Czarniecki, and later John Sobieski. In the first half of May 1660, during the Russo-Polish War, he was sent with a raid against Ivan Khovansky. Near the village of Konstantynów, he captured an enemy companion and prisoners. The information obtained from the prisoners allowed Czarniecki to move towards Slonim and capture it. Skrzetuski defeated the Russian detachment near Piaski, and on May 17, in Vawkavysk, he captured the banner of the Belarusian gentry commanded by Hieronim Horski. In the retreat over the Narew river, he suffered a defeat. He probably also participated in the battles of Polonka (June 28) and Basia river (12 October 1660).

In late November 1662, the Confederates murdered their superior, Hetman Wincenty Gosiewski. Skrzetuski did not participate in the murder, but played a significant role in those events, appearing as a colonel of the confederate forces. This crime shook public opinion. His subordinates committed numerous robberies. Despite this, Skrzetuski's authority grew, and soon he was mentioned in sources as a lieutenant of a cavalry company. In 1667, he was mentioned as a vice-rittmaster. After Czarniecki's death, Skrzetuski was associated with Sobieski. From the mid-1667, there is a mention that Skrzetuski brought several prisoners with significant information about the enemy.

On 16 August 1671, Skrzetuski distinguished himself in the battle of Bar, as mentioned in several sources. Skrzetuski commanded several hundred soldiers, while the enemy had one and a half thousand. He captured nine Tatars and several Cossacks. He was a respected raider, indispensable in seeking "language". (Note: Captives who could be "pulled by the tongue", that is, made to testify about their troops.)

Until 1671/1672, Skrzetuski served as a lieutenant, but due to his experience, he was entrusted with the command of larger cavalry formations. In 1672, he found himself in the king's entourage, his importance increased, and he became a rittmaster of the Royal Cavalry. He received a letter of commendation to recruit a Cossack company. He formed a cavalry company from both Greater Poland voivodeships: Kalisz and Poznań, and prepared for the Battle of Khotyn, which took place on 11 November 1673. The company took part in the battle, but probably without its commander.

Despite his merits to the country, and moreover, his long military service, he did not make a great career, did not acquire lucrative stewardships, or receive a land office.

== Lawsuits and court judgments ==
The first mention of Skrzetuski is associated with an incident. On Sunday, after St. Andrew's Day, 30 November 1634, he was spending time in one of the taverns in Chwastów (Chwastów – Nowy Wereszczyn) with Pobiatyński, a royal infantry rittmaster. On their way back to the castle, they got into a fight, initiated by whom is unknown; it is only known that Skrzetuski "chopped" his companion and "left him without thinking of help". He left him half-dead by the roadside. Pobiatyński lodged a complaint against Skrzetuski with the district court in Lviv.

The next judicial source is dated 19 May 1663, when he and his soldiers received a lawsuit before the Lublin Tribunal for the murder of the hetman. On June 15, during a default trial, he was sentenced to exile, and his subordinates to infamy and death penalty. On 31 March 1664, due to requisitions in royal villages, he was sued by the tribunal. Skrzetuski was then on the Moscow front, so he did not appear in Lublin. The tribunal sentenced all the accused to eternal exile. On 12 May 1666, the Lublin Tribunal sentenced Skrzetuski and four other officers to infamy for robberies they committed in December 1665 in the town of Bazaliia and nearby farms.

In 1667, he attempted to marry Zofia Zawadzka of Belz by force, who a week after the attack became the wife of Jan Wilczkowski, the steward of Kyiv. On 22 August 1667, an agreement was concluded in Lviv, according to which the injured parties were to receive compensation for damages in cash, and Skrzetuski voluntarily agreed to serve a two-week prison sentence in the tower of Lviv Castle. In 1668, the Lublin Tribunal sentenced him to infamy for the attack on the house of Zofia Zawadzka. At the end of his life, several court judgments hung over him. The punishment was not carried out because he remained under the jurisdiction of the hetman.

== Legend ==
Skrzetuski's feat at Zbarazh became part of history, celebrated in poetic works, letters from the front, and memoirs (including those of Jakub Łoś and Samuel Twardowski). However, the hero was generally mentioned without his full name, and his surname was distorted, making the identification of the correct Skrzetuski difficult. Kazimierz Ceypler wrote about Mikołaj Skrzetuski in a poem dedicated to the Skrzetuski family in 1701. The precise name and surname are provided in judicial sources. Papal nuncio Cosmas de Torres called him a Ruthenian and a Skrzetunowski schismatic. Historian Wawrzyniec Jan Rudawski wrote in the late 17th century and referred to him as Jan Skrzetuski, mistaking him for a royal secretary bearing that name and surname. This version was adopted by Henryk Sienkiewicz, thus creating the literary character of "Jan Skrzetuski" in With Fire and Sword. In the 1930s, Olgierd Górka claimed that Skrzetuski was an Orthodox Cossack. Zygmunt Lasocki, based on archival research, proved that Skrzetuski's name was Mikołaj.

== Bibliography ==
- Hundert, Zbigniew (2014). "Jak Mikołaj Skrzetuski został rotmistrzem pancernym, czyli kilka uwag o ostatnich latach służby wojskowej pierwowzoru bohatera "Trylogii"". In Żojdź, K.; Sowa, J. J. (eds.). Studia nad staropolską sztuką wojenną (in Polish). Oświęcim: Twarda. ISBN 978-8378892403.
- Jurek, Tomasz (2019). "Słownik historyczno-geograficzny ziem polskich w średniowieczu". www.slownik.ihpan.edu.pl (in Polish). Instytut Historii Polskiej Akademii Nauk.
- Kienzler, Iwona (2014). 1649 Zbaraż (in Polish). Warsaw: Bellona. ISBN 978-8379890682.
- Kosman, Marceli (1966). Na tropach bohaterów Trylogii. Światowid (in Polish). Vol. 75 (1 ed.). Warsaw: Książka i Wiedza. OCLC 1511187.
- Kosman, Marceli (1989). Skrzetuski w historii i legendzie (in Polish). Poznań: KAW. ISBN 83-03-02605-4.
- Lasocki, Zygmunt (1937). "Skrzetuscy. Ciąg dalszy". Miesięcznik Heraldyczny (in Polish). 6.
- Majewski, Wiesław (1997). "Skrzetuski Mikołaj". PSB (in Polish). XXXVIII.
- Śledziński, Kacper (2005). Zbaraż 1649. Historyczne bitwy (in Polish). Warsaw: Wydawnictwo Bellona. ISBN 978-83-11-10237-8.
- Wasilewski, Tadeusz (1964). "Kim był Skrzetuski". Mówią Wieki (in Polish) (9 ed.). Archived from the original on 2014-12-16.

== Supplementary literature ==
- Marcinkowski, Karol (1977). Stefan Czarniecki: wódz – mąż stanu – rok 1660 (in Polish). Philadelphia: wódz - mąż stanu - rok. pp. 109–115.
- Michałowski, Jakub (1864). "List ze Zbaraża od oblężeńców do Króla JMci pisany snadź na początku Sierpnia 1649". Księga Pamiętnicza (in Polish). Kraków: w drukarni C.K. Uniwersytetu. pp. 428–429.
