= Aleksander Sielski =

17th-century Polish nobleman

- Marshal, Castellan, Chamberlain, Envoy
- Born: 1610±
- Died: 1682

Lubicz Coat of Arms

Aleksander Sielski (1610–1682) was a Polish noble. He bore the Lubicz coat of arms, as the envoy to the king, was the Castellan of Gniezno and Łęczyca, Chamberlain of Poznań and 74th Marshal of Sejm in the Polish–Lithuanian Commonwealth (1652).

== Family background ==
Sielski was born around 1610 to a wealthy family settled in Greater Poland. He was related to the Leszczynski family, which was highly influential in the late 1640s.

== Life ==
As a young man he served in a Cossack regiment as a Towarzysz and fought in battles against the Swedes (1626–1629). Under the command of Hetman Stanislaw Koniecpolski, he took part in the suppression of the Taras Fiedorowicz Cossack uprising in 1630–1631. He also participated in military campaigns against Moscow.

He was a bearer of the Lubicz coat of arms. In 1648, he became Chamberlain of the city of Poznań, and held the title of Castellan of Gniezno from 20 February 1659 to 18 August 1681. During that time, he was also the Castellan of Łęczyca from 1655 to 1659.

From 23 July to 17 August 1652 he was 74th Marshal of the Polish–Lithuanian Commonwealth. His term was cut short.

He was part of the "Obronie Złotej Wolności” movement (Defense of "Golden Liberty") that opposed the war plans of the deceased king Władysław IV Vasa. Sielski supported equal rights for all subjects of the Polish–Lithuanian Commonwealth, including Cossacks.

During the Khmelnytsky Uprising, he was one of the most prominent members of the negotiations. The Sejm resolution of 22 July 1648 selected him, Adam Kisiel (Voivode of Bracław), Franciszek Dubrawski (Chamberlain of Przemyśl) and Teodor Obuchowicz (Chamberlain of Mazyr) to negotiate with Bohdan Khmelnytsky. The negotiations ended in failure in February 1649.

== The Deluge ==
Aleksander Sielski fought in the Second Northern War, a part of a series of wars known as The Deluge. During the Swedish invasion, Sielski remained faithful to King John II Casimir. At the end of September Sielski came to Nowy Sacz, where on 30 September 1655 he participated in the council of the senate, accompanied King John II Casimir on the way to Głogówek, where the procession arrived on 17 October. Sielski took part in the council of the Senate with the participation of the king in Krosno, continued in Lancut in January 1656.

Sielski was among the first senators to sign – with representatives of the army – an act to confederate the states of the crown to launch an offensive against the Swedes to defend Poland. At the end of January, Sielski, together with Stanislaw Witowski (Castellan of Sandomierz), was sent to help Stefan Czarniecki, in the organization of the winter expedition in Sandomierz and Lublin, with the task to mobilise armies of the Polish nobility with which to fight the Swedes.

In February Sielski fought in the Battle of Gołąb. In March Sielski met with the king in Lviv, and then accompanied him in a march to Warsaw, where he witnessed the surrender of Swedish Field Marshal Arvid Wittenberg. Arvid was imprisoned in Zamość where he later died in 1657. Sielski held the position of administrator of the treasury, tasked with raising funds to reorganize and pay the crown's army during the Battle of Warsaw.

In Warsaw, Sielski was accompanied by the queen, and then together with the court he went to Lublin. In August 1657, Sielski went as a representative of the king to accept the surrender of the Swedes. The act of surrender was signed by Swedish General Paul Würtz in a camp near Kraków, and in September Sielski filed the signature on the ratification of the Treaty of Roskilde with Denmark. Sielski participated in parliament, as a deputy to the Court treasury in Radom and Rawa.

== See also ==
- Marszałek sejmu
- pl:Bogusław Leszczyński (podkanclerzy koronny)
- Adam Kisiel
