= With Fire and Sword (film) =

1999 Polish historical drama film by Jerzy Hoffman

With Fire and Sword - Ogniem i mieczem
- Polish release poster
- Directed by: Jerzy Hoffman
- Written by: Jerzy Hoffman; Andrzej Krakowski
- Based on: With Fire and Sword by Henryk Sienkiewicz
- Produced by: Jerzy Frykowski; Jerzy Hoffman; Jerzy R. Michaluk
- Starring: Izabella Scorupco; Michał Żebrowski; Aleksandr Domogarov
- Cinematography: Grzegorz Kędzierski
- Edited by: Marcin Bastkowski; Cezary Grzesiuk
- Music by: Krzesimir Dębski
- Distributed by: Syrena EG
- Release date: 12 February 1999
- Running time: 175 minutes (theatrical version); 203 minutes (extended miniseries version)
- Languages: Polish, Ukrainian, Crimean Tatar; English subtitles
- Budget: 24,000,000 zł ~ $8,000,000 (as of Aug. 2010)
- Box office: 105,089,363 zł ~ $26,366,071 In ~1999, probably excluding later BD, DVD, VHS, TV: $26,366,071 PLN: 105 089 363; Cinema only - viewed by people/tickets: 7,151,354

With Fire and Sword (Polish: Ogniem i Mieczem; Ukrainian: «Вогнем і Мечем», romanized: Vohnem i Mechem) is a 1999 Polish historical drama film directed by Jerzy Hoffman. The film is based on the novel With Fire and Sword, the first part in The Trilogy of Henryk Sienkiewicz. At the time of its filming it was the most expensive Polish film ever made.

== Plot ==
Jan Skrzetuski, a lieutenant of Prince Jeremi Wiśniowiecki, rescues Bohdan Khmelnytsky from a band of thieves, only to be informed later that Khmelnytsky is wanted by the Polish Crown. At a tavern, Skrzetuski becomes acquainted with nobleman Jan Onufry Zagłoba and Longinus Podbipięta, a warrior who wishes to fulfil his vow of cutting off the heads of three infidels, all at the same time with one blow. On his way to Lubne, Skrzetuski assists a noblewoman, Helena Kurcewicz, and her aunt after their carriage becomes stuck in mud. In gratitude, Helena's aunt invites them to their estate in Rozlogi, where Skrzetuski meets Jurko Bohun, a Cossack ataman and Helena's fiercely jealous fiancée. Sensing that Helena disapproves of her prearranged betrothal, Skrzetuski secretly makes a counteroffer to Helena's aunt for her niece's hand, to which Helena's family approves.

In Lubne, Wiśniowiecki sends Skrzetuski to the Zaporizhzhian Sich to negotiate with Khmelnytsky, who is plotting a revolt against the nobility with the help of Tatars led by Tuhaj Bej. On arrival, Skrzetuski is captured and held hostage by Cossacks who bring him to their victories against the Poles in Zhovti Vody before releasing him. Meanwhile, Bohun discovers the Kurcewiczes' betrayal after intercepting messages from Skrzetuski's messenger Rzędzian, leading him to raid Rozlogi with his band and massacre the entire household, leaving Helena as the only survivor. Zagłoba, who accompanied Bohun in an attempt to mediate, rescues Helena and escapes with her after gravely injuring Bohun. A recovered Bohun chases after Zagłoba and Helena as the Cossack revolt ravages Ukraine and claims the lives of the nobility. Zagłoba leaves Helena in the care of the fortress of Bar, only for him to learn later that Bar had fallen to the Cossacks.

Wiśniowiecki responds to the Cossack revolt by executing Khmelnytsky's emissaries and mobilizing his private army against the rebels before holing up at his fortress in Zbaraż. After a series of misadventures, Zagłoba and one of Wiśniowiecki's lieutenants, Michał Wołodyjowski, encounter Bohun at a tavern and challenge him to a duel. Wołodyjowski badly injures Bohun and the triumphant Zagłoba and Wołodyjowski leave him in the care of the Cossacks, confident that Bohun is good as dead. Rzędzian later reappears after being trapped behind Cossack lines and says Bohun is still alive and holds Helena hostage in a cave inhabited by a witch named Horpyna. Rzędzian, Zagłoba and Wołodyjowski set out to the cave, where they kill Horpyna and his minion and rescue Helena and then fend off Tatar marauders before being rescued by reinforcements from the Crown.

Meanwhile, a despondent Skrzetuski, thinking that Helena is dead, joins Zagłoba, Podbipięta and Wołodyjowski at Zbaraż, which is besieged by the Cossacks. The fortress and its inhabitants fiercely resist sustained attacks, with Podbipięta fulfilling his vow of beheading three infidels, only to be killed by Tatars when he tries to sneak out to inform the King of their predicament. Skrzetuski volunteers to replace Podbipięta and is more successful, convincing the King to amass an army to lift the siege. As he recovers, he is met by Rzędzian and Helena, reviving his spirits.

The King and his army arrive in Zbaraż, forcing Khmelnytsky to lift the siege after Tuhaj Bej signs a separate peace agreement with the Crown. Bohun defies Khmelnytsky and leads his men to a cavalry charge against Zbaraż, only to be defeated again by a volley of gunfire led by Wołodyjowski. Bohun is presented to Helena and Skrzetuski, who releases him to the surprise of everybody and returns his weapons. Bohun warns Skrzetuski that he will return to Khmelnytsky and glances at Helena one last time before riding off towards the sunset.

== Cast ==
- Izabella Scorupco as Helena Kurcewiczówna
- Michał Żebrowski as Jan Skrzetuski
- Aleksandr Domogarov as Jurko Bohun (dubbed by Jacek Rozenek)
- Krzysztof Kowalewski as Jan Onufry Zagłoba
- Bohdan Stupka as Bohdan Khmelnytsky
- Andrzej Seweryn as Jeremi Wiśniowiecki
- Zbigniew Zamachowski as Michał Wołodyjowski
- Wiktor Zborowski as Longinus Podbipięta
- Daniel Olbrychski as Toğay bey (Tuhaj Bej)
- Marek Kondrat as John II Casimir
- Wojciech Malajkat as Rzędzian
- Ewa Wiśniewska as Kurcewiczowa
- Ruslana Pysanka as Horpyna
- Gustaw Holoubek as Adam Kisiel
- Andrzej Kopiczyński as Zaćwilichowski
- Maciej Kozłowski as Maxym Kryvonis
- Adam Ferency as İslâm III Giray
- Gustaw Lutkiewicz as Yakiv Barabash
- Dmytro Myrhorodsky as Koshovy otaman
- Jerzy Bończak as Daniel Czapliński
- Krzysztof Gosztyla as Jerzy Ossoliński
- Szymon Kobylinski as Mikołaj Ostroróg
- Andrzej Szczytko as Otaman

== Critical reception ==
The movie has been criticized for introducing some factual inaccuracies not found in the source material. One of the least accurate sections of the film is Hoffman's presentation of the first battle between the Poles and the Cossacks, the Battle of Zhovti Vody. The movie suggests that the Poles were quickly routed by Cossacks and the Polish elite cavalry (husaria) showed needless bravado in the face of unfavorable weather conditions. In reality, the Poles not only were greatly outnumbered, especially after they had been deserted by all of the Cossacks, who had switched sides and joined Bohdan Khmelnytsky, but also had a young commander, Stefan Potocki, who was only 24 years old. Even so, the battle was eventually lost by the Poles but lasted for nearly three weeks.

The original book is often deemed to be nationalistic and Ukrainophobic, especially in Ukraine. The movie, on the other hand, has been praised for its depiction of Ukraine and Ukrainians as "vivid rather than monochromatic; they are multi-dimensional, eliciting more than one feeling of, say, fascination or dislike". However, some Polish reviewers felt that the movie emphasized the Cossacks' successes and positive traits but diminished those of the Poles in the spirit of political correctness.

The director was aware of the controversies and the criticism. He was quoted as saying, "Sienkiewicz's book is still considered anti-Ukrainian by some Ukrainians. I understand that problem, but when I was in Kiev at a conference of Ukrainian intellectuals... many people with whom I spoke had read the novel closely and they quoted whole passages where Sienkiewicz criticized the Polish nobles as strongly as the Cossacks. For both sides it was clear that the result of this tragic conflict was the eventual demise of both the Commonwealth and the Sich. I am well aware that the film may agitate those in Ukraine who blame everything on the Poles, and in Poland those who blame all that was bad on the Ukrainians. My film will certainly not convince any radicals.... My film finishes with the final words of Sienkiewicz's novel: 'Hatred poisoned the hearts of two brother nations'".

== Political background ==
Although the original novel is the first part of the Trilogy, the film was the last part of Hoffman's version of the trilogy to be made, following The Deluge, which was filmed in 1974, and Colonel Wolodyjowski, which was filmed in 1969. This might have been due to political tension between Polish People's Republic and Ukrainian SSR, as filming a novel taking up a politically loaded subject of Polish-Ukrainian relations (another stalled film project was Taras Bulba by Nikolai Gogol) was deemed undesired by the Soviet Union.

== Box office ==
The film turned out to be a box office success grossing PLN 105,089,363 ($26,366,071) against a budget of PLN 24,000,000 ($8,000,000).

== See also ==
- The Deluge
- Colonel Wolodyjowski
- “Taras Bulba”, a 1962 film
- “Taras Bulba”, a 2009 film
