= Crasnîi Octeabri =

Crasnîi Octeabri Красный Октябрь
- Commune
- Location within Moldova
- Coordinates: 48°0′41″N 28°32′47″E
- Country (de jure): Moldova
- Country (de facto): Transnistria (Note: Transnistria's political status is disputed. It considers itself to be an independent state, but this is not recognised by any UN member state. The Moldovan government and the international community consider Transnistria a part of Moldova's territory.)
- Elevation: 37 m (121 ft)
- Time zone: UTC+2 (EET)
  - Summer (DST): UTC+3 (EEST)

Crasnîi Octeabri (Moldovan Cyrillic and Russian: Красный Октябрь, romanized: Krasnyy Oktyabr', Ukrainian: Красний Октябр, romanized: Krasnyy Oktyabr) is a commune in the Camenca sub-district of Transnistria, Moldova. It is composed of two villages, Alexandrovca (Александровка) and Crasnîi Octeabri. It has since 1990 been administered as a part of the breakaway Transnistrian Moldovan Republic.

According to the 2004 census, the population of the commune was 723 inhabitants, of which 508 (70.26%) were Moldovans (Romanians), 136 (18.81%) Ukrainians and 70 (9.68%) Russians.
