= Aleksandr Domogarov =

Soviet-Russian singer (born 1963)

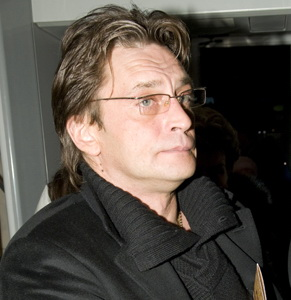
- Aleksandr Domogarov in 2009.
- Born: Aleksandr Yurievich Domogarov; 12 July 1963 (age 63); Moscow, RSFSR, USSR
- Occupations: Actor, TV presenter
- Years active: 1984–present
- Aleksandr Domogarov's voice From the Echo of Moscow program, 23 April 2005
- Website: Official website

Aleksandr Yurievich Domogarov (Russian: Алекса́ндр Ю́рьевич Домога́ров, born 12 July 1963) is a Soviet and Russian theater actor, TV presenter, Russian chanson singer, People's Artist of Russia (2007), actor known for playing historical roles.

== Biography ==
Aleksandr Domogarov was born in Moscow, Russian SFSR, Soviet Union (now Russia).

In 1984, Domogarov played in the Russian film Inheritance. He continued to play in the Mossovet Theatre. Since April 2005, Domogarov has been the lead in an open-ended run of Jekyll and Hyde at the Mossovet Theater.

He then returned to Bandit Petersburg but this time playing a different role. In 2005 he starred in the film The One Who Lost the Sun. He also starred in the TV series Woman's Romance. In 2006 he played in the film The Wolfhound.

== Awards ==
- 1997 - Seagull Award for Best Actor 1996-1997 theater season of the year for his role in the play of Georges Duroy Bel Ami.
- 2000 - Honored Artist of Russia
- 2007 - People's Artist of Russia

== Personal life ==
- The first wife Natalia Sagoyan
  - Son Dmitry (January 7, 1985 - 7 June 2008), was killed in an accident
- The second wife - Irina Gunenkova
  - Son Alexander Domogarov Jr., director and actor, was born on February 7, 1989
- Married actress Natalia Gromushkina in 2001 but was divorced from her in 2005.

== Filmography ==
Aleksandr Domogarov has starred in over 92 films

Year	Title	Role	Notes
1984	Nasledstvo	Slava	
1985	Likha beda nachalo	Anton	
1986	Mikhail Lomonosov	Alexander Sumarokov	Mini-series
1987	Assa (film)	Alexander I	
1988	Tamara Aleksandrovna's Husband and Daughter	classmates Fedi	
1989	The visit of the old lady	Khobi	TV movie
1990	Do It – One!	Junior Sergeant Gosh	
1991	Blood for blood	Bubus	
1992	Midshipmen — III	Pavel Gorin	
1993	If you like to know ...	Vasily Solenyy, officer	
1993	Revenge of jester		
1994	Mercy Cross	Andrey	TV series
1996-97	Queen Margot	Count de Bussy	TV series
1997	Countess de Monsoreau	Count de Bussy	TV series
1996	White Dance	Nikita, a successful businessman	
1999	With Fire and Sword	Jurko Bohun	
1999	Na koniec swiata	Wiktor	
2000	Dykaren	Viktor	
2000	The game on the flight	Nikolay	
2000	Empire under Attack	Georgy Gapon	TV series
2000-01	Gangster Petersburg. 1. Baron, 2. Counsel, 3. The collapse of Antibiotic	Andrey Seregin	Mini-Series
2001	Turkish March	Alexander Turetsky	TV movie
2002	I - doll	Viktor Vorobyov, spetsnaz	
2003	Why do you have an alibi?	Igor	TV movie
2003	The Idiot (TV series)	Evgeniy Radomskiy	TV series
2003	Gangster Petersburg. 4. The prisoner, 5. Oper, 6. Journalist	Andrey Seregin	Mini-Series
2004	Uzkiy most	Anatoliy Gladyrev	Mini-series
2004	Honeymoon	Andrey	Mini-series
2004-05	Fala zbrodni	Siergiej - Mafia Boss	TV series
2005	Tyomny Instinct		TV series
2005	Lost the Sun	Anton Chelyshev	Mini-series
2005	Female Novel	Oleg Ermakov	TV series
2005	Star of the era	Konstantin Simonov, poet	Mini-series
2006	Satisfaction	Alexander Shulenin	Mini-series
2006	Count of Montenegro	Mikhail Miloradovich	
2006	Wolfhound (2006 film)	Vinitarly	
2007	Indie	Arseni	
2007	Gloss	Misha Klimenko	
2008	White night, sweet night	Pavel Vlasov, a businessman	
2009	Tsar (film)	Aleksei Basmanov	
2009	If our fate	Alexander Vlasov, the famous artist	TV series
2010	The legend of the flying Cyprian	Valent	
2010	Senior wife	Max	
2011	Pilot International Airlines	Alexander Stepanov	Mini-series
2011	On the sunny side of the street	Yuriy Kondratevich	TV series
2011	Dostoevsky	Alexander Issaïev	Mini-series
2011	Battle of Warsaw 1920	Kryshkin	
2011	Secrets of Palace Revolutions	Linar	TV series
2012	Zonnentau	Harald Somerset	TV series
2012	Marina Grove	Troshin	TV series
2012	Face of Another	Stavinsky	TV series
2012-13	Krew z krwi	Anton	TV series
2013	Weekend	Prefect Ivan	
2013	Kill Stalin	Ivan Berezhnaya, the captain of the NKVD	Mini-series
2014	Marina Grove - 2	Troshin	TV series
2015	Pennsylvania		
2015	POETIC PORTRAITS AT GIFT FESTIVAL		film by shota kalandadze
2019	The Prisoner of Sakura	Captain Vasily Boysman	
2021	A Dog Named Palma		
