= Jan Skrzetuski =

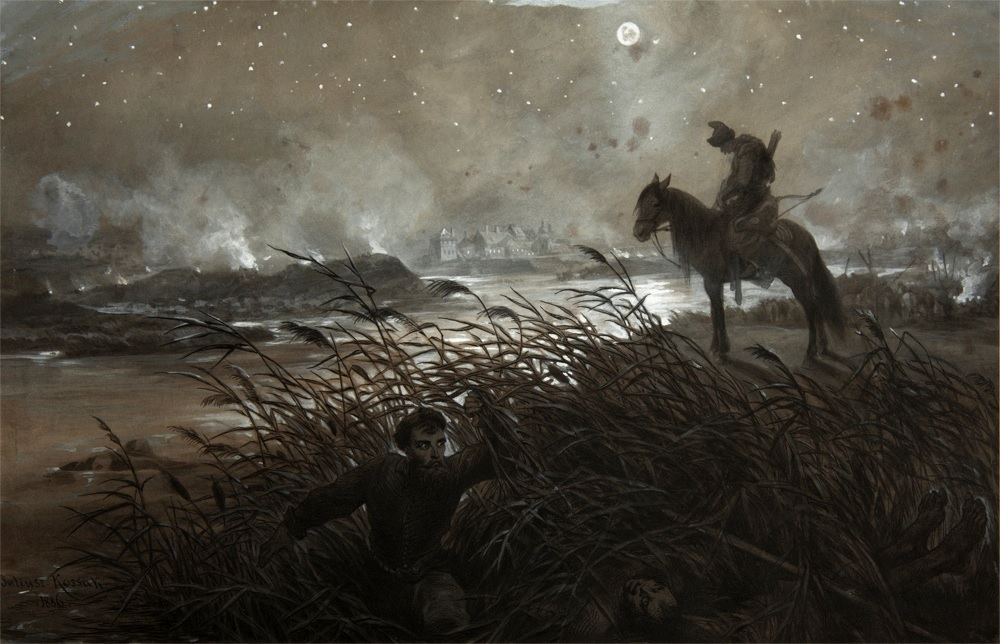
- Skrzetuski on his way to the king, by Juliusz Kossak
- First appearance: With Fire and Sword
- Last appearance: Colonel Wolodyjowski
- Created by: Henryk Sienkiewicz
- Portrayed by: Michał Żebrowski; Pierre Brice

In-universe information
- Gender: Male
- Family: Unknown
- Spouse: Helena Kurcewiczówna
- Children: 12 sons and one daughter (born in 1672)
- Relatives: Stanisław Skrzetuski (cousin)
- Religion: Christian
- Nationality: Pole

Jan Skrzetuski is a fictional character created by Polish author Henryk Sienkiewicz in the novel With Fire and Sword. He is a man of honour, always faithful to his master, duke Jeremi Wiśniowiecki. He loves Helena Kurcewiczówna, who was kidnapped by the Ukrainian Cossack Yuri Bohun, who is also in love with her. Skrzetuski is the best friend of Michał Wołodyjowski. Jan Skrzetuski is partly based on a historical character, Mikołaj Skrzetuski, the Polish hero of the Siege of Zbarazh.

In the 1999 film With Fire and Sword he is portrayed by Michał Żebrowski.

== Story ==
Jan Skrzetuski (modeled on the historic form of Mikołaj Skrzetuski, a colonel from Greater Poland of the Jastrzębiec clan) was a young Polish nobleman (szlachcic) of Jastrzebiec Coat of Arms serving Prince Jeremi Wiśniowiecki as lieutenant of the hussar regiment. In 1647 he was coming back from Crimea where he had been sent as an envoy. On his way he saved Bohdan Khmelnytsky who was attacked by Daniel Czapliński's servants. He let Khmelnytsky go and went to Chyhyryn. He met there Jan Onufry Zagłoba and Longinus Podbipięta who became his friends. A few days later he set off to Lubny with Podbipięta. They met on their way princess Helena Kurcewicz and her aunt. Skrzetuski and Helena fell in love with each other. The old princess invited soldiers to their house, Rozłogi. During the feast, Skrzetuski learned that Helena had been promised to the Cossack colonel Bohun. Skrzetuski threatened the old princess Kurcewicz and persuaded her to give Helena's hand to him.

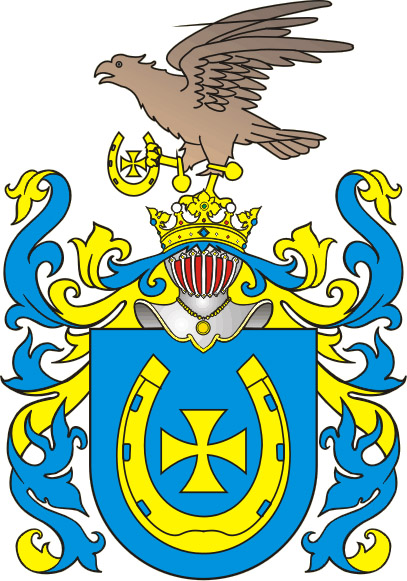

Soon Skrzetuski was sent by Prince Jeremi Wiśniowiecki to Zaporizhian Sich as an envoy. During the mission he was wounded and taken captive. He was saved by Khmelnytsky, who was grateful for Skrzetuski's help. Khmelnytsky, however, didn't agree to set him free at once. Skrzetuski as a captive witnessed Polish defeat in Battle of Zhovti Vody.

In the meantime Bohun discovered the old princess' betrayal and attacked Rozłogi, intending to kidnap Helena. She managed to escape, but the rest of family was killed and the dwór was burnt by peasants. When Skrzetuski regained his freedom, he headed to Rozłogi but found there only ruins. He grieved, thinking that Helena was dead. He was found in Rozłogi by his friends.

Skrzetuski returned to the service of Wiśniowiecki and soon met Zagłoba, who told him that Helena was alive and safe in Bar. Skrzetuski planned to go there, but he received the news that the city had been captured by Bohun. Skrzetuski set off to search for Helena but failed to find any trace of her. He only received information that his beloved was murdered in the monastery in Kiev (which was not true). After these news Skrzetuski became ill. He didn't know that Helena was found by Rzędzian, Wołodyjowski and Zagłoba.

After recovering, Skrzetuski went to Zbarazh, where he bravely fought during the siege. After Podbipięta's death he decided to sneak through the Cossacks' camp and go to John Casimir to let him know that soldiers in Zbarazh needed reinforcements. He managed to fill his mission - the king went with his army to Zbarazh and soon the treaty was signed.

During recovery Skrzetuski was treated by Rzędzian who told him that Helena was alive. The girl soon arrived and they went to Lviv to get married.

After the Khmelnytsky Uprising Skrzetuski lived with Helena and their children in Burzec. They had 12 sons and at least one daughter. Skrzetuski appeared in The Deluge and was mentioned in Fire in the Steppe. In 1673 he took part in the Battle of Khotyn.

== Description ==
Skrzetuski is described as an attractive, dark-haired young man.

He was a very young man, of spare habit of body, dark complexion, very elegant in manner, with a delicately cut countenance and a prominent aquiline nose. In his eyes were visible desperate daring and endurance, but his face had an honest look. His rather thick mustache and a beard, evidently unshaven for a long time, gave him a seriousness beyond his years.
