= Sienkiewicz's Trilogy =

Novel series by Henryk Sienkiewicz

The Sienkiewicz's Trilogy (1884–1888) is a series of three novels written by the Polish author Henryk Sienkiewicz. The series follows dramatized versions of famous events in Polish history, weaving fact and fiction. It is considered a great literary work, on par with Adam Mickiewicz's Pan Tadeusz.

The first novel, titled With Fire and Sword, chronicles the mid-17th century Khmelnytsky Uprising, a revolt by the Ukrainian Cossacks in the Polish–Lithuanian Commonwealth.

The second book, The Deluge, describes the subsequent Swedish invasion of Poland, now known as the Deluge.

The final novel, Fire in the Steppe (Polish title: Pan Wołodyjowski, lit. Sir Wołodyjowski), follows wars between Poland and the Ottoman Empire in the late 17th century.

The trilogy was written by Sienkiewicz at a time when the Polish state – after being partitioned between Russian, Austrian and German empires at the end of the 18th century – did not exist, and the majority of Poles were living in the Russian occupation zone named Vistula Land, formerly Congress Poland. One of Sienkiewicz's goals in writing The Trilogy was to encourage and strengthen Polish national confidence against the occupying powers.
