= Adam Kisiel =

Ruthenian nobleman

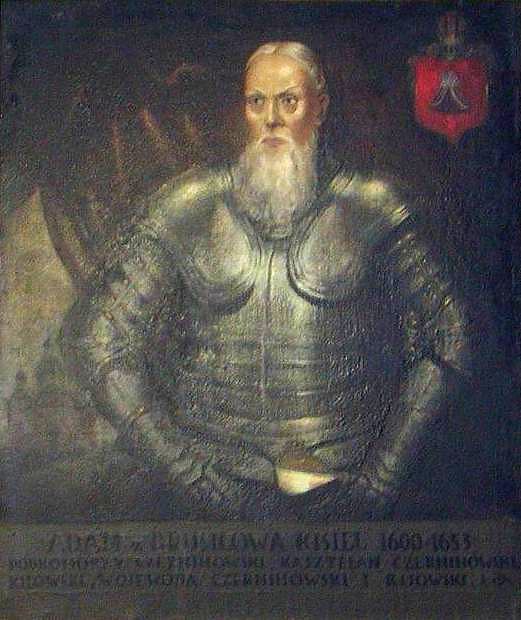
- Coat of arms: Namiot
- Full name: Adam Kisiel of Namiot
- Born: 1580 or 1600
- Died: 1653
- Family: House of Kisiel
- Consort: Anastazja Bohuszewicz
- Father: Grzegorz Kisiel

Adam Kisiel (Polish: Adam Kisiel; Ukrainian: Адам Кисіль, romanized: Adam Kysil; 1580 or 1600 – 3 May 1653) was a Polish nobleman of Ruthenian origin. He served as the voivode of Kiev from 1649 to 1653. He was also the castellan or voivode of Czernihów from 1639 to 1646. Kisiel has become better known for his mediation during the Khmelnytsky Uprising.

== Origin ==
Adam Kisiel's ancestors can be found among the former Ruthenian nobility. However, in the times of Adam Kisiel, most of the Ruthenian nobility was almost completely Polonized.

He considered himself a Polish nobleman, which he stated at the Convocation Sejm in 1648.

I am a Polish nobleman and a senator (...) I have no connection with the Cossack rebellion, because there are no noblemen there (...).

== Family ==
Adam Kisiel was a member of the noble family Kisiel, which used its own coat of arms, sometimes called Światołdycz. They were a Ruthenian family, originally from Volyn. His grandfather, Gniewosz Kisiel, was a colonel in the service of the Polish king Sigismund I the Old, and lost his life in the battle of Orsza. His father, Grzegorz, was a podsędek of Włodzimierz. He signed his name as Kisiel Niskinicki. Adam's brother was Mikołaj Kisiel (d. 1651), a chorąży of Nowogród Siewierski. Adam Kisiel was married to Anastazja Krystyna Bohuszewicz. She was probably a daughter of Filion Bohuszewicz Hulkiewicz, and a widow of a Butowicz. The couple was childless.

== Life ==
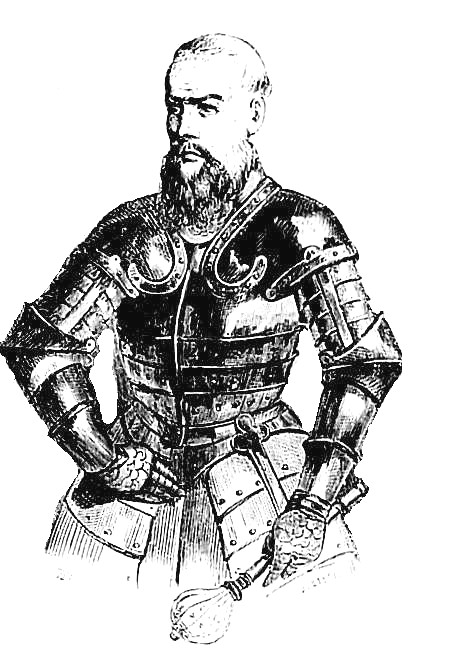

Adam Kisiel according to the older historiography was born around 1580. After Tadeusz Jan Lubomirski in 1905 published his work Adam Kisiel wojewoda kijowski, where is contained information that on the grave inscription of Adam Kisiel is mentioned that he died as 53 years old, historians stated that he was born in 1600.

Kisiel was baptized into the Eastern Orthodox faith. He was educated in Zamojski Academy in spirit of humanism and tolerance.

Adam Kisiel fought under the order of Stanisław Żółkiewski since 1617 to 1620. He fought in the battle of Cecora (1620) and in the battle of Chocim (1621).

Kisiel persuaded king Władysław IV Vasa to reinstate the Orthodox hierarchy and he acted as an intermediary between the Royal Court, General Sejm, and Cossacks.

He was a mediator in the 1637 Pavlyuk Uprising. Afterwards he was responsible for the conscription of 5,000 Registered Cossacks. Kisiel was also appointed as the Voivode of Bratslav in 1647.

During the Khmelnytsky Uprising he was one of the most prominent members of the negotiations and pro-Cossack factions among the szlachta. In the very beginning of the Uprising he sent an Eastern Orthodox monk, Petroni Łaska, to try to calm down the Cossacks and begin negotiations. The Sejm resolution of 22 July 1648 chose him, Aleksander Sielski, podkomorzy poznański, Franciszek Dubrawski, podkomorzy przemyski and Teodor Obuchowicz, podkomorzy mozyrski, to negotiate with Khmelnytsky. The negotiations ended in failure by February 1649.

Adam Kisiel died on 3 May 1653.

== See also ==
- Cassian Sakowicz

== Sources ==
- Frank Sysyn. Between Poland and the Ukraine: The Dilemma of Adam Kysil, 1600-1653

Preceded by Janusz Tyszkiewicz Łohojski	Voivode of Kiev; 1649–1653	Succeeded by Stanisław "Rewera" Potocki
