= Spa Park, Ciechocinek =

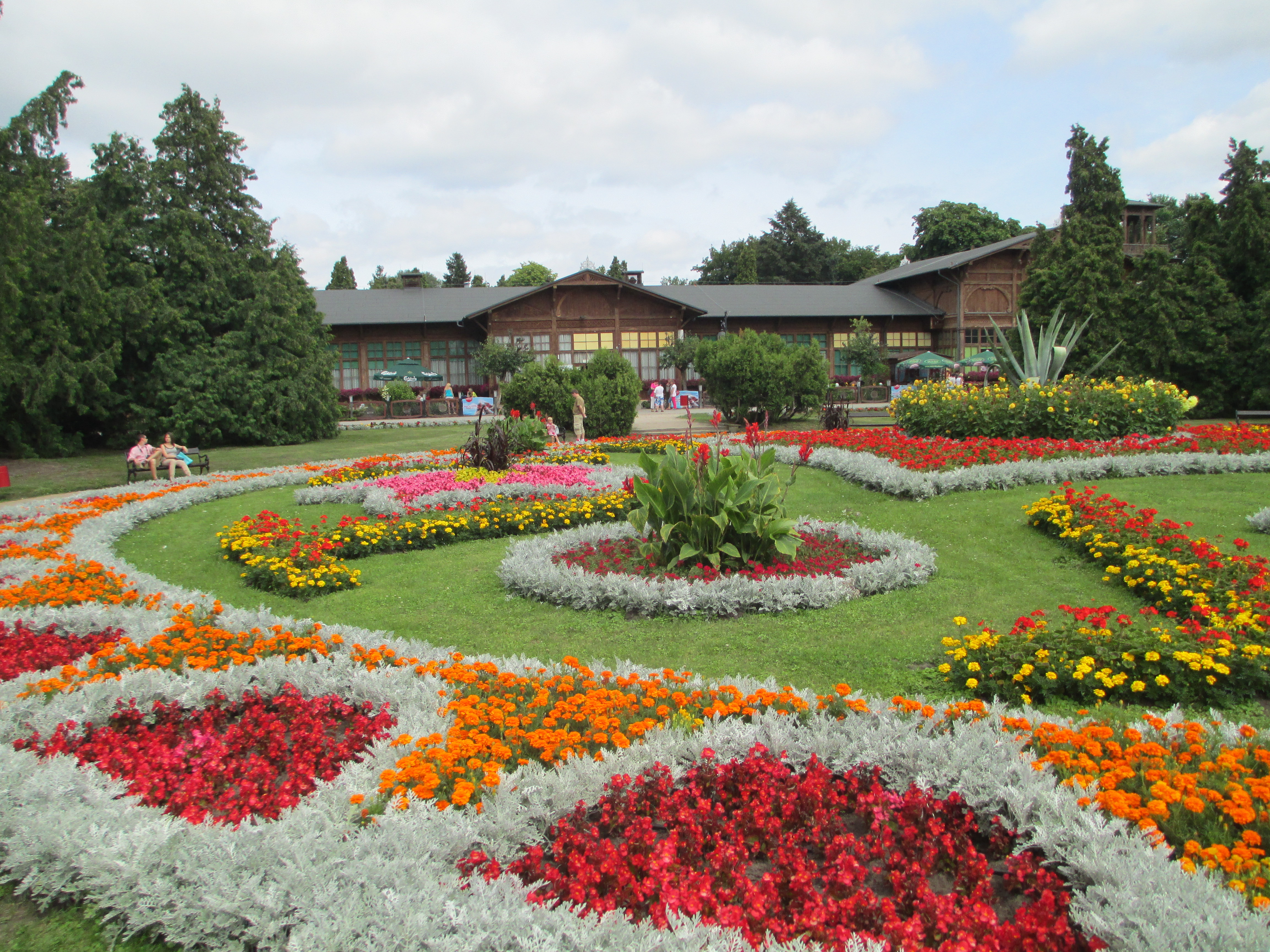
Main garden

The Spa Park in Ciechocinek - the largest (19 ha) of the four parks in Ciechocinek created in the years 1872-1875 according to the design of Hipolit Cybulski modified and improved by Franciszek Szanior.

== History ==
The park was based on a garden situated at the walking gallery, arranged during the construction of Karol Müller's hotel according to the project of Franciszek Tournelle in 1851. In addition to maples, oaks, lime trees and spruces, there is also the Kentucky coffeetree, ginkgo biloba, Caucasian wingnut and American tulip tree. A single nature monument is located here - a pedunculate oak 22 metres high and 390 cm in circumference.

A new walking gallery was opened in the place of the old, burnt down one. Between 1880 and 1881 a "Swiss-style" water drinking hall was built - designed by Edward Cichocki. Since then the "Swiss-style" has been a typical feature of Ciechocinek. It has an annex with a turret on the east side. It was rebuilt in the interwar period. The building currently houses a concert hall and the "Bristol" café.

A wooden concert shell was built in the centre of the Park in the Zakopane style in 1909 (designed by Paweł Fedders). Other examples of park architecture are the fountain "Hansel and Gretel" and the building of the steam engine.

Currently, a number of cultural events of national importance are held in the concert shell: The Ciechocinek Artistic Impressions Festival of Disabled Children's Songs, Opera and Operetta Festival, Great Gala of Tenors, Ciechocinek Blues Festival - and local events: The Regional Review of Bands and Fire Brigades on the promenade in Ciechocinek and the Kujawy and Dobrzyn Land Folklore Festival.

== Gallery ==
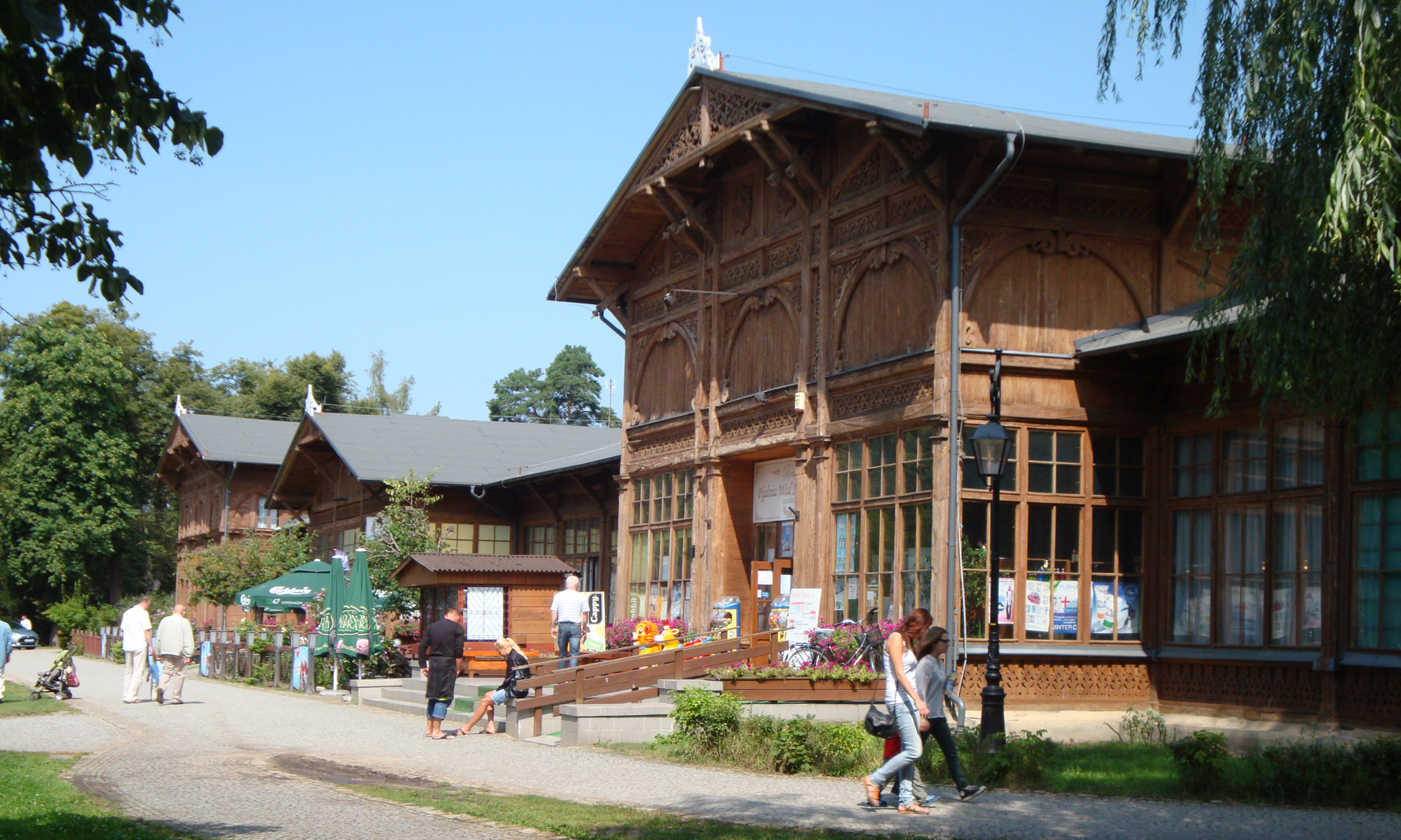
Water drinking hall

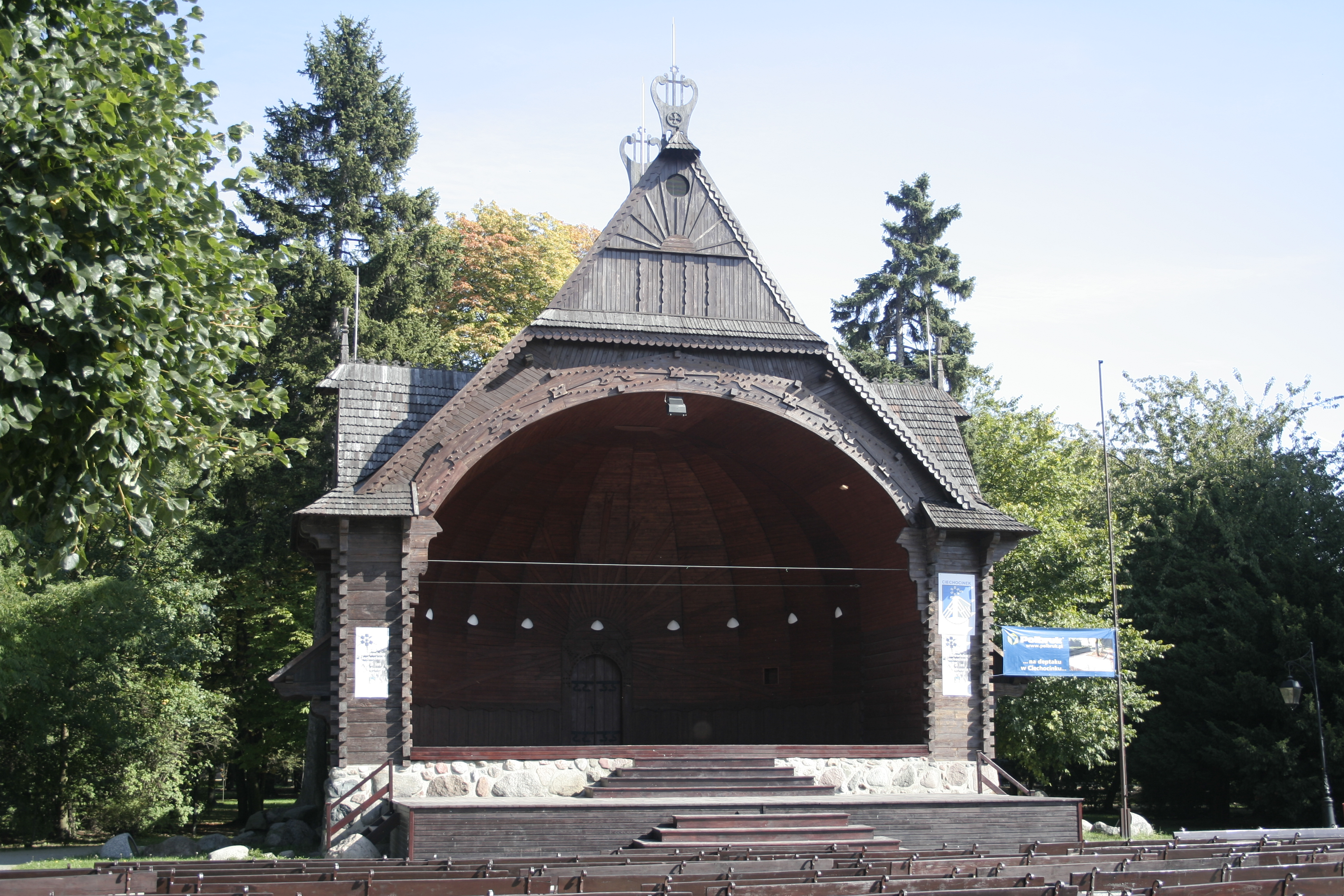
Concert shell

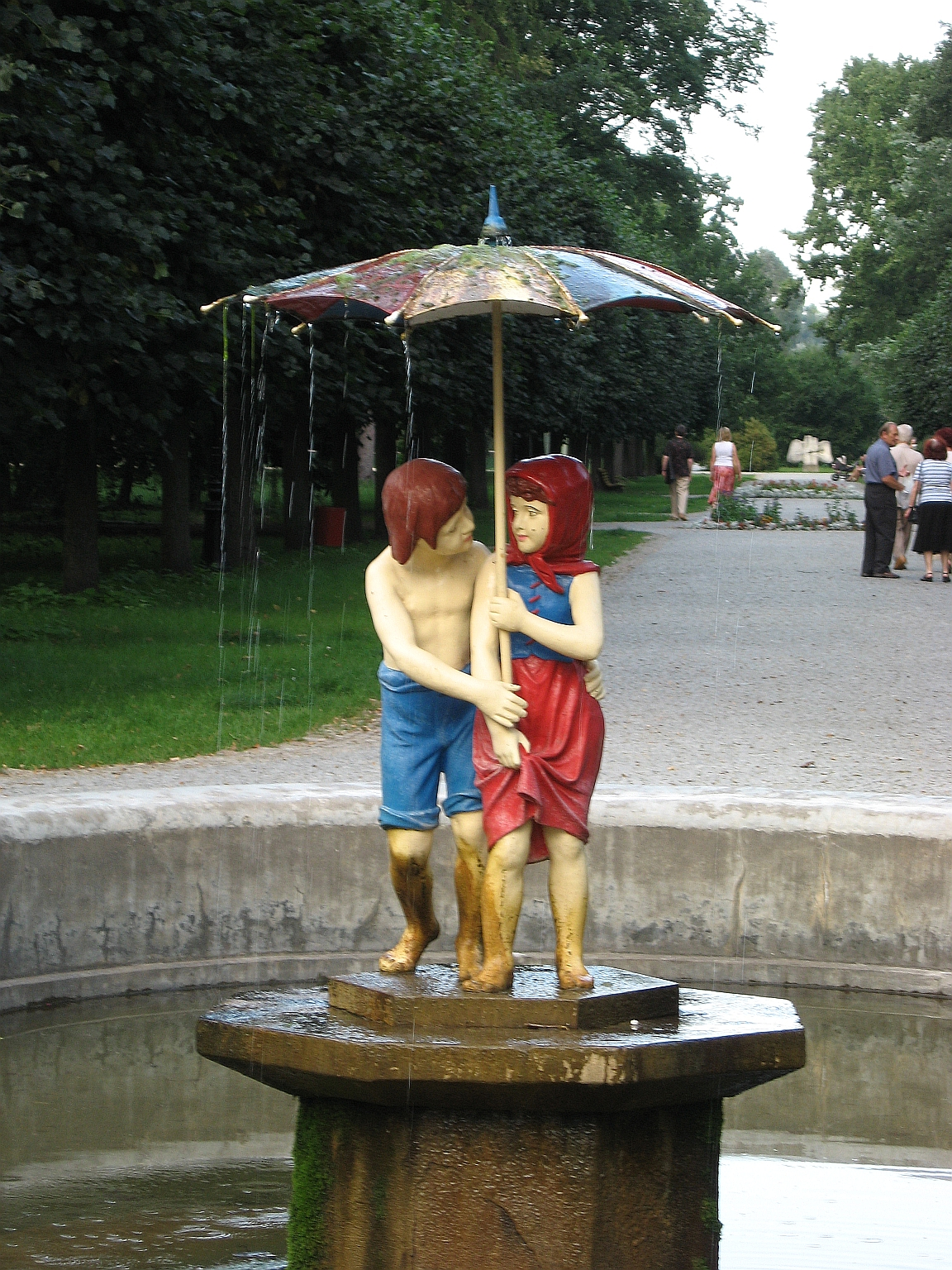
Fountain of Hansel and Gretel

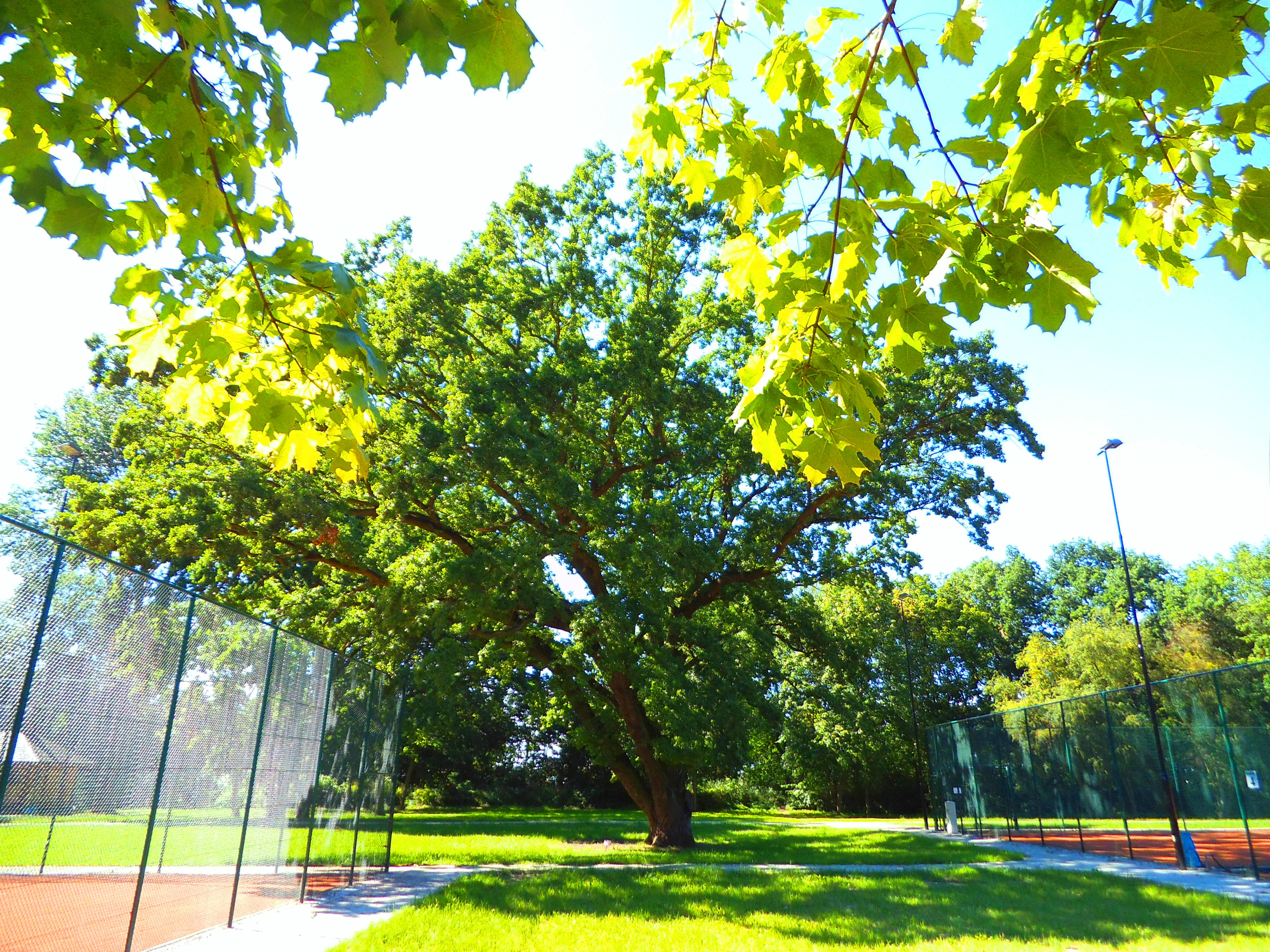
Nature monument - pedunculate oak
