= Elstelä =

Elstelä is a Finnish surname. Notable people with the surname include:

- Esko Elstelä (1931–2007), Finnish screenwriter and film director
- Kristiina Elstelä (1943–2016), Finnish actress
