= Prawo i pięść =

1964 Polish drama film

- Directed by: Jerzy Hoffman; Edward Skórzewski
- Written by: Józef Hen
- Screenplay by: Józef Hen
- Based on: Prawo i pięść by Józef Hen
- Starring: Gustaw Holoubek
- Cinematography: Jerzy Lipman
- Edited by: Ludmila Godziaszwili
- Music by: Krzysztof Komeda
- Production company: Zespół Filmowy "Kamera"
- Distributed by: Centrala Wynajmu Filmów
- Release date: 14 September 1964 (Poland)
- Country: Poland
- Languages: Polish; German

Prawo i pięść ("The Law and the Fist") is a 1964 Polish post-war Eastern drama film directed by Jerzy Hoffman and Edward Skórzewski. Based on a 1964 novel of the same name (originally published as Toast) by Józef Hen, the film sparked a lively reaction among critics: some praised its adaptation of Western conventions to the Polish context, while others criticized it for being merely an imitation of American Westerns. It has since achieved cult status and is regarded as a significant work in the history of Polish cinema.

== Plot ==
Set in 1945, immediately after the end of World War II, it tells the story of Andrzej Kenig, a former fighter of the Polish resistance and survivor of a German concentration camp. He is sent with a small group of men as government representatives to the fictional town of Siwowo/Graustadt in the so-called Recovered Territories, the new western territories of Poland. Their task is to secure the property left there by the retreating Germans. The small town is mostly abandoned and the only remaining inhabitants are four women and a drunken waiter at the hotel. Upon reaching the town, Kenig discovers that the other members of the government delegation are not who they claim to be, and that their only task is to loot as much of the property as they can for themselves. Kenig decides to fight against the gang of bandits alone, which leads to a shootout on the rooftops and in the streets of the deserted town.

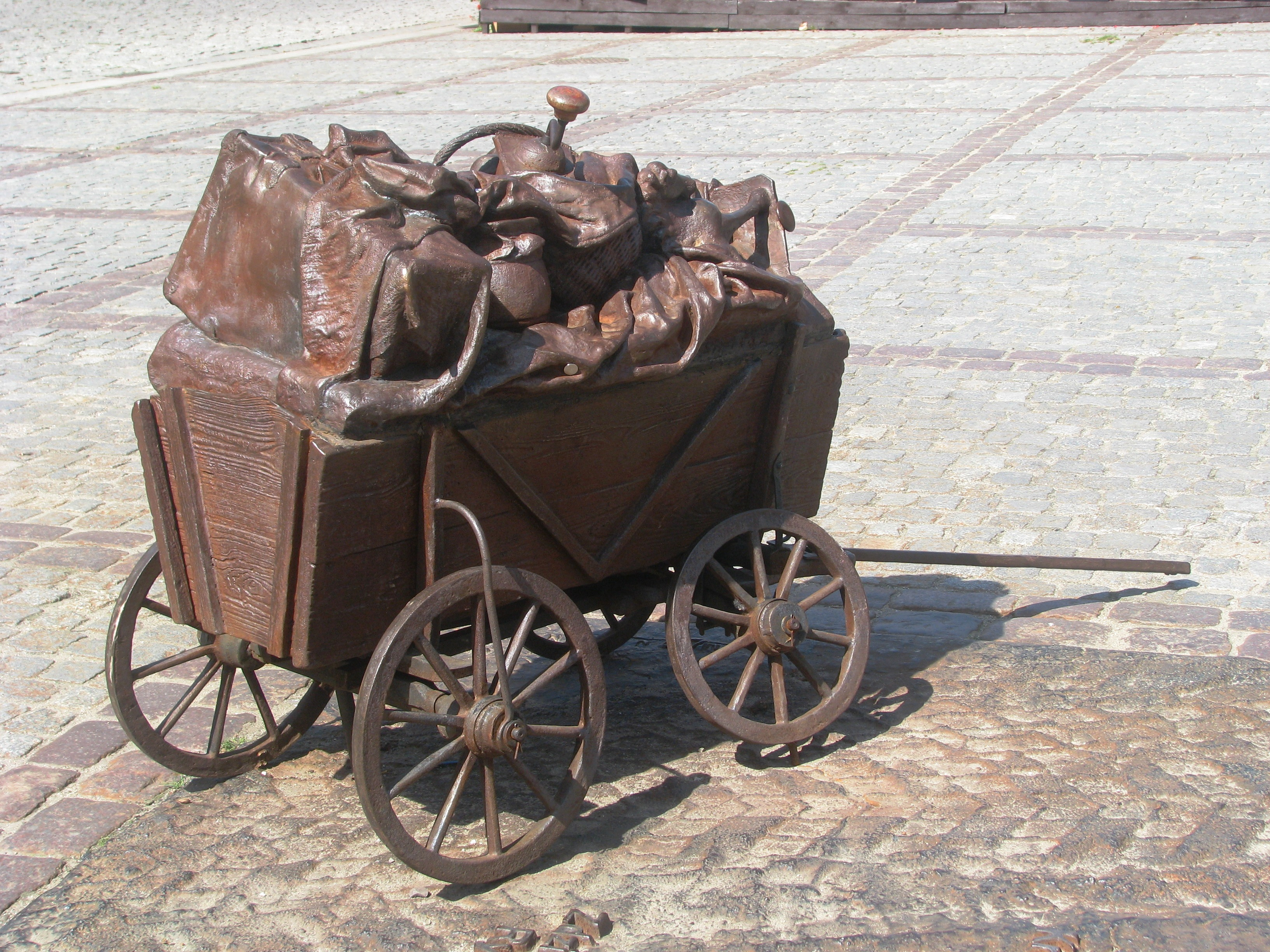
Sculpture commemorating Prawo i pięść in Toruń, where the film was shot.

== Cast ==
- Gustaw Holoubek as Andrzej Kenig
- Zofia Mrozowska as Anna
- Hanna Skarzanka as Barbara Dubikowska
- Wiesław Gołas as Antoni Smólka
- Zdzisław Maklakiewicz as Czesiek Wróbel
- Ryszard Pietruski as Wijas
- Jerzy Przybylski as Doctor Mielecki
- Wiesława Kwaśniewska as Zoska
- Ewa Wiśniewska as Janka
- Zbigniew Dobrzynski as Rudlowski
- Józef Nowak as Lieutenant Wrzesinski
- Adam Perzyk as Maitre d'hotel Schaffer

== Production ==
After making the 1962 comedy Gangsterzy i filantropi, Jerzy Hoffman and Edward Skórzewski—whose subsequent comedy scripts had been rejected—decided to switch genres. "We realized we had to do something in a different genre, because our satire was too critical of the system, and they wouldn't let us make that kind of film anymore". An opportunity arose when Witold Lesiewicz abandoned work on an adaptation of a screenplay by Józef Hen, titled Toast. Upon receiving an offer from the "Kamera" Film Unit to produce the script, Hoffman and Skórzewski accepted.

Exterior scenes were shot in Toruń as well as in Koronowo, Ciechocinek, and Chełmża. A ballad titled "Nim wstanie dzień" was recorded for the film, featuring music by Krzysztof Komeda and lyrics by Agnieszka Osiecka; it was performed by the actor Edmund Fetting, who did not appear in the film itself. The idea for the ballad's style came from Hoffman, who recalled: "When Agnieszka Osiecka, Komeda, and I were sitting together thinking about the music, it suddenly occurred to me: if we were to cross Okudzhava with an American WesternWestern ballad, that would be exactly what we needed. And that is the hybrid we created."

== Reception ==
Upon its release, Prawo i pięść was immediately hailed as the first Polish Western (the term "Eastern"—referring to films sharing a similar convention but produced in the East—was also used). Writing in Tygodnik Kulturalny, Kazimierz Kochański praised the film, writing that, as a Western born of Polish circumstances, it "stripped the American Western of its seemingly unique exoticism [...] and brought Western tropes down from the realm of abstraction and fantasy to a realistic setting". Conversely, Krzysztof Teodor Toeplitz condemned this approach, accusing the filmmakers of a "devious and original directorial ploy" that involved dressing up the American Western in costumes closer to the local reality. Jerzy Niecikowski, writing for the magazine Kultura, viewed the choice as driven more by the directors' ethical convictions: "Hoffman and Skórzewski used the Western convention precisely as a vehicle to convey their own moral standards. That is the primary element they adopted from the Western—and arguably the best part of it".

From a film studies perspective, Łukasz A. Plesnar confirmed the critics' intuitions, describing a number of striking similarities between Prawo i pięść and American Westerns (even though the film was made on the other side of the Iron Curtain). Above all, the protagonist of Prawo i pięść embodies the classic Western convention: he is "just and honest—not only toward others but also toward himself—as well as solitary, energetic, strong, and uncompromising". The final shootout also bears similarities to the corresponding sequence in Fred Zinnemann's High Noon, and the division of characters into good and evil is drawn from the classic Western. Furthermore, as Plesnar wrote when comparing Prawo i pięść with High Noon, "the action of both works is set in small towns, and the most dramatic events unfold on deserted streets and in the equally empty buildings adjoining them". Other elements of the film that clearly evoke the conventions of the classic Western include the ballad "Nim wstanie dzień"; a protagonist skilled in the use of a handgun, and the motif of a journey to the West (or, in the case of the Hoffman and Skórzewski film, to the Recovered Territories). Marek Haltof added, however, that the ideological aim of Prawo i pięść differed from that of classic Westerns: the Hoffman and Skórzewski film paved the way for Polish "Easterns", featuring protagonists with wartime pasts who "fight not only against criminal elements but also against enemies of the new system".
