= Shōgo Hamada =

Shōgo Hamada 浜田 省吾
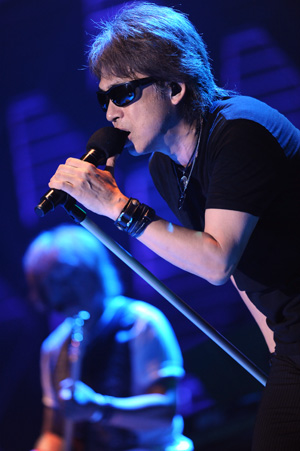
- Shōgo Hamada (2011)

Background information
- Born: December 29, 1952 (age 73)
- Origin: Takehara, Hiroshima Prefecture, Japan
- Genres: Adult contemporary, rock, Japanese pop, rhythm and blues
- Occupation: Singer-songwriter
- Instruments: Vocals, guitars, harmonica, drums, percussion
- Years active: 1975–present
- Label: Sony Music Entertainment Japan (SME Records)
- Website: Shogo.r-s.co.jp

Shōgo Hamada (浜田 省吾, Hamada Shōgo; born December 29, 1952) is a Japanese singer-songwriter and former member of the group Aido. He is a part of Sony Music Japan's SME Records division. He was born in Takehara City in Hiroshima Prefecture, and graduated from Kuremitsuta High School (where he was a member of the baseball team). He attended Kanagawa University, where he studied law, but left the school before graduating.

In 1975, he made his professional debut as the drummer of the band Aido. Sunglasses have been his trademark ever since his debut, and he has never performed live without sunglasses of some sort (most commonly Ray-Ban Aviator or Ray-Ban Wayfarer). His solo debut came in 1976 with the album Umareta Tokoro o Tōku Hanarete. Though his exposure in the media has always been extremely low, relative to many performers with similar levels of mainstream popularity, he has acquired his many fans over the years through his steady series of live performances. Many of his early songs expressed his skepticism about how one should live their life. In addition to his well-known ballads, he was strongly influenced by his father's experience as a victim of radiation poisoning following the atomic bombing of Hiroshima in 1945, and many of his songs have a very strong protest song tone.

He has written music for many other artists, including Momoe Yamaguchi, and Akiko Wada. He is affectionately referred to as "Hamasho" by many of his fans.

== Discography ==
=== Singles released within Aido ===
#	Single title	Date released	Formats
1	"Couple's Summer" (二人の夏, Futari no Natsu) / "Sign of Rain" (雨模様, Ame Moyō)	1975-05-01	EP
2	"Seibu Shinjuku Line Romance" (恋の西武新宿線, Koi no Seibu Shinjuku-sen) / "Aido Theme" (愛奴のテーマ, Aido no Tēma)	1975-09-01	EP

=== Singles ===
#	Single title	Date released	Formats
1	"Back Street Boy" (路地裏の少年, Roji Ura no Shōnen) (EP version) / "Face the Wall" (壁にむかって, Kabe ni Mukatte) (EP version)	1976-04-21	EP
2	"Love Bargain" (愛のかけひき, Ai no Kakehiki) (Single version) / "Winter on Campus" (キャンパスの冬, Kyanpasu no Fuyu)	1976-10-21	EP
3	"Love Train" (ラブ・トレイン, Rabu Torein) / "Until I See You" (君に会うまでは, Kimi ni Au Made wa)	1977-04-21	EP
4	"Cold and Windy Season" (木枯しの季節, Kogarashi no Kisetsu) / "Solitary Highway" (独りぼっちのハイウェイ, Hitori-botchi no Haiuei)	1977-11-21	EP
5	"Filling with Tears" (涙あふれて, Namida Afurete) / "Me Back Then" (あの頃の僕, Ano Koro no Boku)	1978-08-21	EP
6	"Let Love Sleep" (愛を眠らせて, Ai o Nemurasete) / "Crush" (片想い, Kata Omoi)	1979-04-21	EP
7	"Feel the Wind" (風を感じて, Kaze o Kanjite) / "Morning Silhouette" (朝のシルエット, Asa no Shiruetto)	1979-08-21	EP
8	"Kiss Goodbye" (さよならにくちづけ, Sayonara ni Kuchidzuke) / "Miss Lonely Heart" (ミス・ロンリー・ハート)	1979-12-21	EP
9	"Youth's Vision" (青春のヴィジョン, Seishun no Vijon) / "A Story of Broken Love" (とぎれた愛の物語, Togireta Ai no Monogatari)	1980-02-21	EP
10	"Generation Without a Tomorrow" (明日なき世代, Ashita Naki Sedai) (Single version) / "Concert Tour" (演奏旅行, Ensō Ryokō)	1980-07-21	EP
11	"Tokyo" (東京) / "Like Gunpowder" (火薬のように, Kayaku no Yō ni)	1980-10-21	EP
12	"A Place in the Sun" (陽のあたる場所, Yō no Ataru Basho) / "Bitch Seventeen" (あばずれセブンティーン, Abazure Sebuntiin)	1981-03-21	EP
13	"Last Show" (ラストショー) / "Before Goodbye" (さよならの前に, Sayonara no Mae ni)	1981-08-26	EP
14	"Sadness Is Like Snow" (悲しみは雪のように, Kanashimi wa Yuki no Yō ni) / "Sentimental Christmas" (センチメンタルクリスマス)	1981-11-21	EP
15	"On the Road" / "Last Dance" (ラスト・ダンス) (Live)	1982-02-25	EP
16	"My Hometown" (マイホームタウン) / If You Fall in Love (恋に落ちたら, Koi ni Ochitara)	1982-11-21	EP
17	"Dance" (12-inch single version) / "The Little Rocker's Medley" (Live)	1984-08-01	12-inch
18	"Lonely—A Promise Called Love" (Lonely-愛という約束事, Ai to Iu Yakusokugoto) (Single version) / "One More Saturday" (もうひとつの土曜日, Mō Hitotsu no Doyōbi) (Single version)	1985-05-22	EP
19	"Big Boy Blues" (Single version) / "Sweet Little Darlin'" (Single version)	1985-12-08	EP
20	"Back Street Boy" (路地裏の少年, Roji Ura no Shōnen) (12-inch Single version) / "Late Summer Bell" (晩夏の鐘, Banka no Kane) (12-inch Single version) / "Walking in the Rain"	1986-07-16	12-inch, CT
21	"Couple's Summer" (二人の夏, Futari no Natsu) c/w "Little Surfer Girl"	1987-06-21	EP
22	"Breathless Love" c/w "Blood Line" (Single version)	1988-05-29	12-inch, 8-cm CD, CT
23	"Sadness Is Like Snow" (悲しみは雪のように, Kanashimi wa Yuki no Yō ni) (Single version) / "Under the Name of Love" (愛という名のもとに, Ai to Iu Na no Moto ni) (Single version)	1992-02-01	8-cm CD, CT
24	"Ave Maria" (アヴェ・マリア) / "Eternal Lover" (永遠の恋人, Eien no Koibito) (Single version)	1992-12-12	8-cm CD
25	"Ring of Stars" (星の指輪, Hoshi no Yubiwa) / "Keep This Feeling" (こんな気持のまま, Konna Kimochi no Mama)	1994-04-25	8-cm CD
26	"Maria My Heart" (我が心のマリア, Waga Kokoro no Maria) / "Romance is Magic!" (恋は魔法さ, Koi wa Mahō sa) (Single version)	1995-07-01	8-cm CD
27	"Goodbye Game" (さよならゲーム, Sayonara Geemu) / "From Then a Couple" (あれから二人, Are Kara Futari)	1996-10-30	8-cm CD
28	"Image Poem" (イメージの詩, Imeeji no Uta) / "Far From My Home Town" (生まれたところを遠く離れて, Umareta Tokoro o Tōku Hanarete) (Single version)	1997-10-22	8-cm CD
29	"Monochrome Rainbow" (モノクロームの虹, Monokurōmu no Niji) / "Blue Sky" (青空, Aozora)	1998-04-01	12-cm CD
30	"Love Has No Pride" c/w "Give Me One More Chance"	1998-10-01	12-cm CD
31	"Poet's Bell" (詩人の鐘, Shijin no Kane) / "The Sun Will Rise Again" (日はまた昇る, Hi wa Mata Noboru)	1998-12-02	12-cm CD
32	"...To Be "Kissin' You"" (French edit) / "On the Road in Midsummer" (真夏の路上, Manatsu no Rojō) / "...To Be "Kissin' You""	2000-04-01	12-cm CD
33	"Call Your Name" (君の名を呼ぶ, Kimi no Na o Yobu) / "Concert Tour" (演奏旅行, Ensō Ryokō)	2001-08-01	12-cm CD
34	"Love Song Devoted to You" (君に捧げる Love Song, Kimi ni Sasageru Love Song) / "Modern Girl" (モダンガール) (21 ctr. Ver.)	2003-09-10	12-cm CD
35	"Season of Light and Shadow" (光と影の季節, Hikari to Kage no Kisetsu) / "Midnight Blue Train 2005"	2005-04-13	12-cm CD
36	"I am a Father" / "The Road I Walked with You" (君と歩いた道, Kimi to Aruita Michi)	2005-07-17	12-cm CD
37	"Thank You" / "Who's That Girl" (あの娘は誰, Ano Musume wa Dare) / "Before Goodbye" (さよならの前に, Sayonara no Mae ni) (2005 Ver.)	2005-10-12	12-cm CD

=== Albums ===
#	Album title	Date released	Formats	Miscellaneous info
–	Aido (愛奴)	1975-05-01	LP, CT	Released as a member of Aido
1	Far from My Home Town (生まれたところを遠く離れて, Umareta Tokoro o Tōku Hanarete)	1976-04-21	LP, CT	
2	Love Train	1977-05-21	LP, CT	
3	Illumination	1978-09-21	LP, CT	
4	Mind Screen	1979-05-21	LP, CT	
5	During Your Life… (君が人生の時…, Kimi ga Jinsei no Toki…)	1979-12-05	LP, CT	
–	Slow Down	1980-08-01	CT	Compilation album
6	Home Bound	1980-10-21	LP, CT	
7	Before the Generation of Love (愛の世代の前に, Ai no Sedai no Mae ni)	1981-09-21	LP, CT	
8	On the Road	1982-02-25	LP (2), CT (2)	
9	Promised Land (Promised Land～約束の地, Yakusoku no Chi)	1982-11-21	LP, CD, CT	
10	Sand Castle	1983-12-01	LP, CD, CT	
11	Down By the Mainstreet	1984-10-21	LP, CD, CT	
–	Club Snowbound	1985-11-15	LP, CT	Limited edition special release album
12	J.Boy	1986-09-04	LP (2), CD (2), CT (2)	
–	Club Surfbound	1987-06-28	LP, CT	Limited edition special release album
13	Club Surf&Snowbound	1987-06-28	CD	
14	Father's Son	1988-03-16	LP, CD, CT	
15	Wasted Tears	1989-09-01	LP, CD, CT	
16	For Whom the Bell Tolls (誰がために鐘は鳴る, Ta ga Tameni Kane wa Naru)	1990-06-21	CD, CT	
17	Edge of the Knife	1991-09-01	CD, CT	
18	The Moment of the Moment (その永遠の一秒に～The Moment of the Moment～, Sono Eien no Ichibyō ni)	1993-09-06	CD, CT, MD	
19	Road Out "Tracks"	1996-02-29	LP, CD, CT, MD	
20	The Door for the Blue Sky (青空の扉 ～The Door for the Blue Sky～, Aozora no Tobira)	1996-11-11	CD, MD	
21	In Early Summer (初夏の頃 ～In Early Summer～, Shoka no Koro)	1997-01-22	LP, CD, MD	
22	The History of Shogo Hamada "Since 1975"	2000-11-08	CD	
23	Save Our Ship	2001-08-22	CD	
24	Early Autumn (初秋, Shoshū)	2003-09-26	CD	
25	My First Love	2005-07-06	LP, CD	
26	The Best of Shogo Hamada Vol.1	2006-08-09	CD	
27	The Best of Shogo Hamada Vol.2	2006-08-09	CD	
28	Journey of a Songwriter	2015-04-29	LP, CD	
