= Slave of Love =

Slave of Love could refer to the following:

- Aido: Slave of Love, 1969 Japanese film
- A Slave of Love, 1976 Russian film
- Slave to Love, 1985 Bryan Ferry song
