= Aito Mäkinen =

Finnish film director

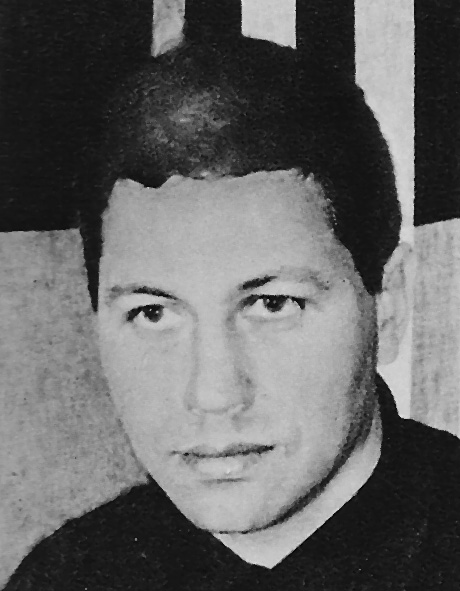
- Born: 4 January 1927; Turku, Finland
- Died: 30 January 2017 (aged 90); Helsinki, Finland
- Occupations: Film director, screenwriter, film producer
- Years active: 1963–1999

Aito Mäkinen (4 January 1927 – 30 January 2017) was a Finnish film director, screenwriter and film producer. He directed more than 45 films between 1963 and 1999. His 1964 film, Onnelliset leikit, was entered into the 4th Moscow International Film Festival.

== Selected filmography ==
- Onnelliset leikit (1964)
