= Nanami: The Inferno of First Love =

- Japanese film poster
- Directed by: Susumu Hani
- Written by: Susumu Hani; Shūji Terayama
- Produced by: Tomoji Fujii
- Starring: Kuniko Ishii; Akio Takahashi
- Cinematography: Yuji Okumura
- Edited by: Susumu Hani
- Music by: Tōru Takemitsu; Akio Yashiro; Masao Yagi; Makoto Wada
- Production companies: Hani Productions; Art Theatre Guild
- Distributed by: Art Theatre Guild
- Release date: 25 May 1968 (Japan)
- Running time: 108 minutes
- Country: Japan
- Language: Japanese
- Budget: $130,000

Nanami: The Inferno of First Love (Japanese: 初恋・地獄篇, Hepburn: Hatsukoi Jigokuhen), also known as The Inferno of First Love and Nanami, First Love, is a 1968 Japanese drama film directed and co-written by Susumu Hani. The film competed for the Golden Bear award at the 18th Berlin International Film Festival in 1968.

According to Hani, Shūji Terayama, known as an underground dramatist at the time, was approached to work on the film but considered the synopsis Hani provided already complete. At the insistence of his investor, Hani later asked Terayama to lend his name to the film for his appeal among younger audiences.

== Plot ==
Nanami, a nude dancer, and her friend Shun, who is still a virgin, rent a room in a love hotel. He isn't able to make love to her, but she is understanding. They reflect on their past; Nanami came from Shizuoka to Tokyo and started working as a dancer because her former job didn't pay enough, Shun was left by his mother as a child and now works as a goldsmith in his stepfather's workshop. In flashbacks, it is revealed that Shun was and is still repeatedly sexually abused by his stepfather.

A customer of Nanami, Ankokuji, talks her into participating in photo shoots of lesbian sadomasochism and erotic catfights, attended by other clients of the red-light district and by yakuza. Shun, who witnessed a photo shoot and is jealous of Ankokuji, confronts him and Nanami. Ankokuji explains that his interest in Nanami arises from his loveless marriage, but when Nanami later sees him with his seemingly harmonious family, she turns away from him in disappointment.

Nanami and Shun continue seeing each other and make another appointment in the love hotel. On his way there, Shun is stopped by Ankokuji's former red light district associates, who try to press him into telling them Nanami's whereabouts. Shun flees and is fatally hit by a car. Nanami, who waits for Shun in the hotel apartment, hears the voices from the street, opens the window and sees Shun's body surrounded by passers-by.

== Cast ==
- Kuniko Ishii – Chiaki Nanami
- Akio Takahashi – Shun
- Haruo Asanu – Algebra
- Ichirō Kimura – Psychiatrist
- Kazuo Kimura – Doctor
- Kōji Mitsui – Mr. Otagaki, Shun's stepfather (although the role is credited to the popular actor Kōji Mitsui (三井弘次) in many English-language reference works, the character is portrayed by a different actor whose name's Kanji characters (満井幸治) also translate to "Kōji Mitsui," and whose only film credit is this role.)
- Kazuko Fukuda – Mrs. Otagaki, Shun's stepmother
- Misako Miyato – Mother
- Minoru Yuasa – Ankokuji
- Kimiko Nakamura – Ankokuji's wife

== Release ==
Nanami: The Inferno of First Love grossed over $1 million in Japan. The film was originally released in the United States with 20 minutes cut.

== Reception ==
Many film scholars consider this work to be one of Hani's major achievements, while others judge the film to be commercial and exploitive. In A Hundred Years of Japanese Film, film historian Donald Richie called it "one of the seminal films of the sixties".

In 2012, filmmaker Ashim Ahluwalia included the film in his personal top ten (for The Sight & Sound Top 50 Greatest Films of All Time poll), writing: "Nanami: Inferno of First Love delivers emerging adolescent sexuality and lyrical debauchery as only the Japanese New Wave can. Do not accept imitations!"

== Bibliography ==
- Buehrer, Beverley Bare (1990). "Nanami – The Inferno of First Love (1968)". Japanese Films: A Filmography and Commentary, 1921-1989. Jefferson, North Carolina, and London: McFarland. pp. 195–197. ISBN 978-0899504582.
