= Bad Boys (1961 film) =

1961 film

- Poster
- Directed by: Susumu Hani
- Written by: Susumu Hani
- Based on: Bad Boys by Aiko Jinushi
- Starring: Yukio Yamada; Hirokazu Yoshitake; Koichiro Yamazaki; Yasuo Kurokawa; Masayuki Itō; Katsuhiro Segawa; Chieko Wada
- Cinematography: Mitsuji Kanau
- Music by: Toru Takemitsu
- Production company: Iwanami Productions
- Release date: 29 March 1961
- Running time: 89 minutes
- Country: Japan
- Language: Japanese
- Budget: $16,000

Bad Boys (Japanese: 不良少年, Hepburn: Furyō Shōnen) is a 1961 Japanese pseudo-documentary drama film about juvenile delinquents, written and directed by Susumu Hani. It is based on the novel of the same name by Aiko Jinushi.

== Plot ==
After his arrest for theft in a jewelry store, juvenile delinquent Asai is sent to a reform school. He is first assigned to the laundry group, where he is bullied by the group's reckless leaders, before he is allocated to a group of youths manufacturing furniture and experiences solidarity and team spirit. He befriends Debari, who was sentenced for repeated mugging with his gang and urges Asai to wise up and not end like him. Asai is eventually released, facing an uncertain future.

== Production and reception ==
Since Hani had a background in documentaries, he shot Bad Boys, his first feature-length fiction film, in a documentary style, using "nonprofessional actors, black and white, hand-held cinematography, and location shooting." It has been considered one of the films to launch the Japanese New Wave.

A facility was used as the filming location.

== Awards ==
Bad Boys was voted the best film of 1961 in the poll of film critics by Kinema Junpo. Hani was awarded the Directors Guild of Japan New Directors Award, and Toru Takemitsu received the Mainichi Film Award for Best Film Score for his work on Bad Boys and Mozu.
