= St. Michael the Archangel Church, Ciechocinek =

Church in Poland

Coordinates: 52.8774°N 18.806°E

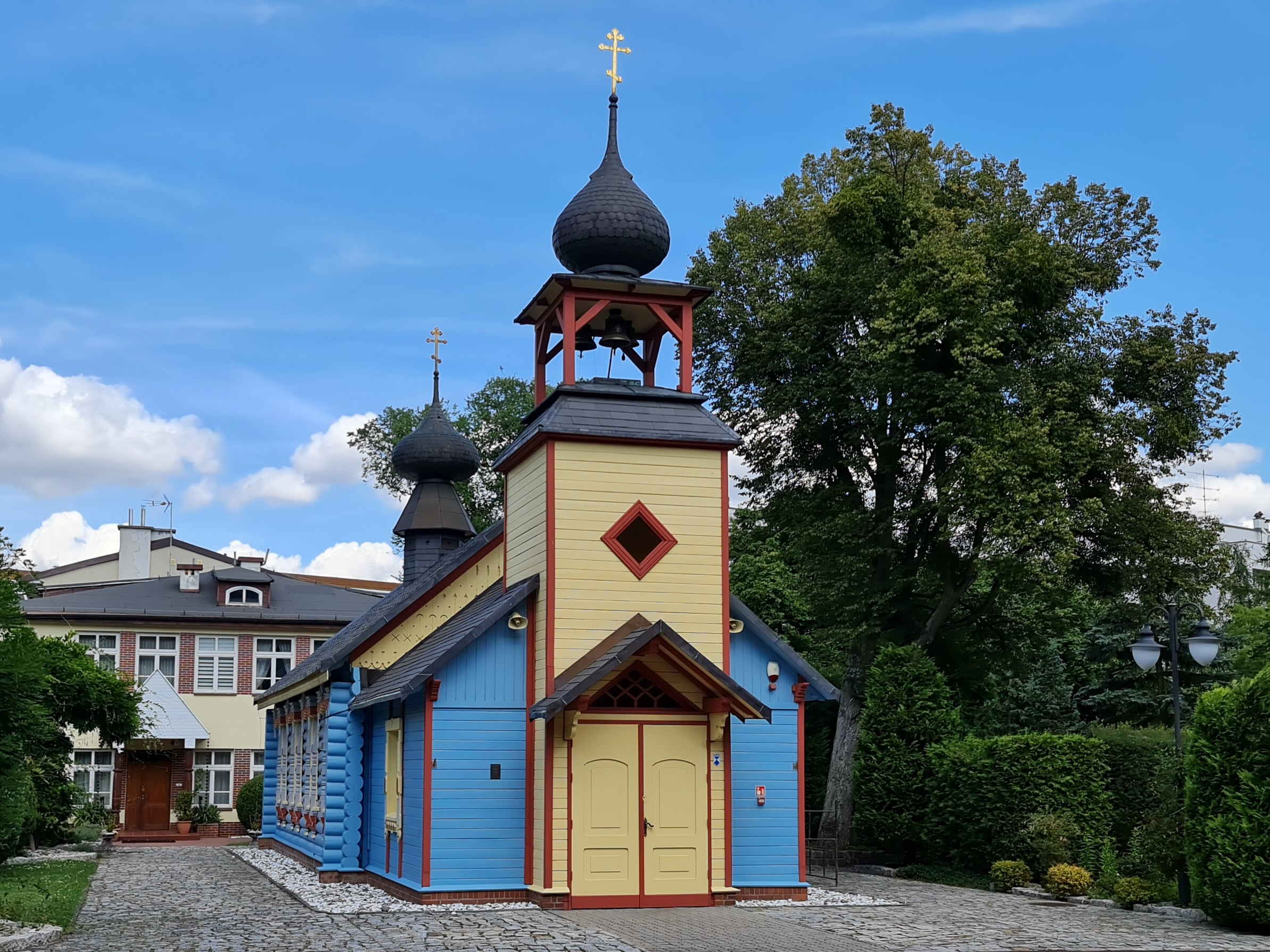

St. Michael the Archangel Church (Polish: Cerkiew św. Michała Archanioła w Ciechocinku) is an Eastern Orthodox church in Ciechocinek, the site of one of the six military Orthodox parishes of the Polish Orthodox Church.

The church was built in 1894. As Ciechocinek was a highly popular spa town, the church was supposed to serve the Russian Orthodox people coming there for healing. It was constructed in an unusual Uralian style, thus becoming the only church in Europe imitating directly the wooden churches of the Urals. After Poland regained independence in 1918, the number of Russian visitors to Ciechocinek suddenly diminished and the Orthodox church was converted into a casino and then a warehouse. In this period, the initial interior of the place was entirely destroyed.

In 1995, Polish Orthodox military bishop Sawa (Hrycuniak) managed to collect the funds to reopen an Orthodox parish in Ciechocinek. On 6 October 1996, after a renovation, the building was reconsecrated by archbishops Sawa and Szymon (the Orthodox archbishop of Łódź and Poznań), while Mikołaj Hajduczenia become the first rector of the parish.

The church has been entirely renovated. The exterior decoration of the church was restored, the whole construction being painted blue, red and yellow. In the interior, a modern white iconostasis was introduced, as there are no information about how had the church been decorated inside before its devastation. A dozen of modern icons has also been put there.

According to the local government of Ciechocinek, the Orthodox church is one of the most unusual tourist attractions of the town. It's also one of the rare examples of Russian Orthodox church architecture in modern Poland, most of the churches built in 19th century being destroyed or rebuilt to serve Roman Catholic parishes.

== Sources ==
- Church at Ciechocinek official website
