= Children Hand in Hand =

1963 film

- Directed by: Susumu Hani
- Written by: Mansaku Itami
- Cinematography: Shigeichi Nagano
- Production company: Kadokawa
- Release date: 28 March 1964
- Running time: 100 minutes
- Country: Japan
- Language: Japanese

Children Hand in Hand (手をつなぐ子ら, Te o tsunagu kora), also known as Hand in Hand, is a 1964 Japanese documentary film directed by Susumu Hani. It was entered into the 4th Moscow International Film Festival where it won a Special Diploma.

== Cast ==
- Hideo Sato
- Yuniko Hodzo
