= Jerzy Hoffman =

Polish film director (born 1932)

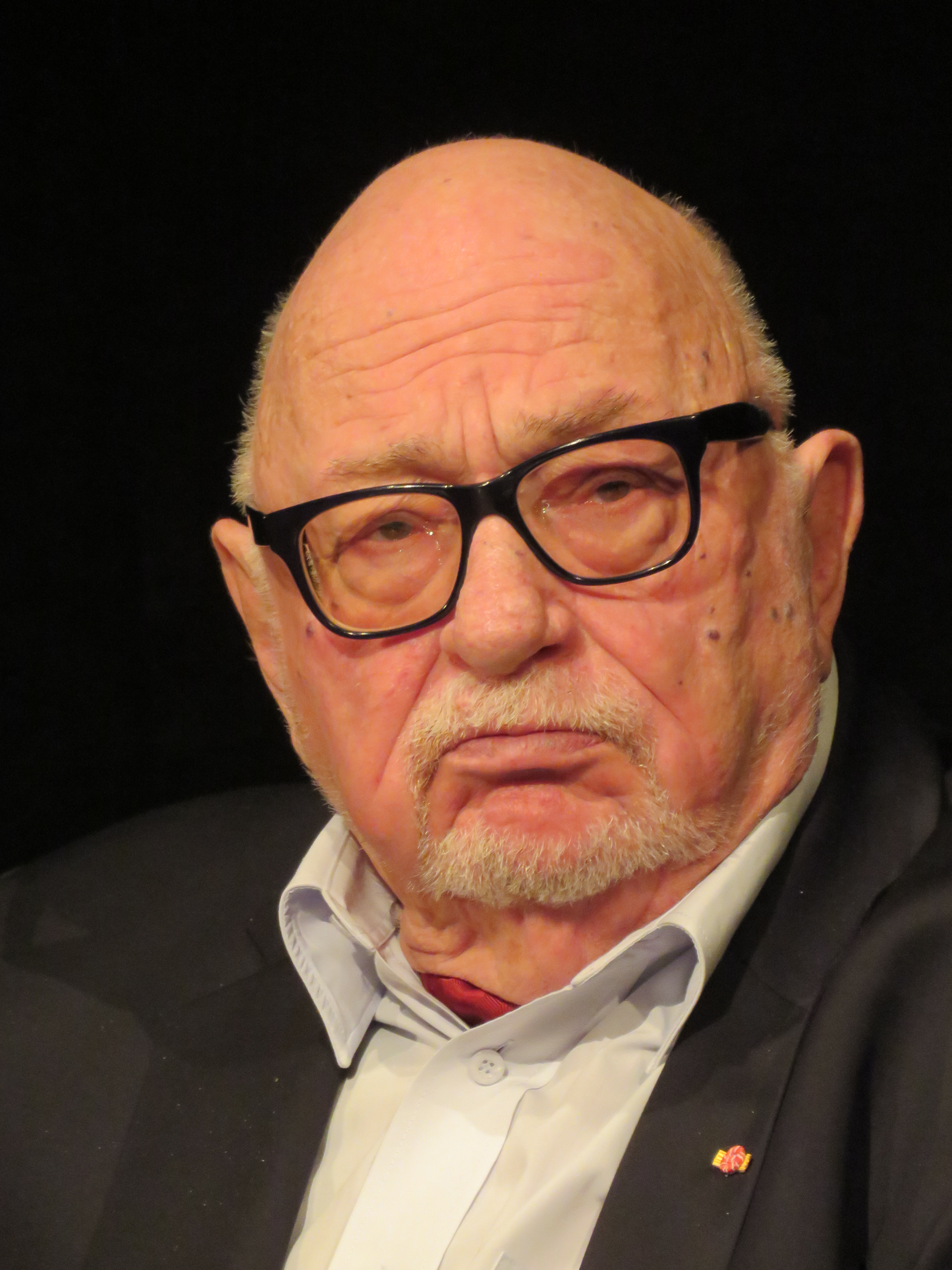
- Hoffman in 2016
- Born: 15 March 1932 (age 94); Kraków, Poland
- Occupations: Director; Screenwriter; Producer
- Years active: 1954–2011
- Children: Joanna Hoffman

Jerzy Julian Hoffman (pronounced [ˈjɛʐɨ ˈxɔfman]; born 15 March 1932) is a Polish director, screenwriter, and producer. He received the Polish Academy Life Achievement Award in February 2006.

Hoffman is best known for his works in The Deluge (1974) and With Fire and Sword (1999), the former of which was nominated for an Academy Award for Best Foreign Language Film. His other notable credits were in Three Steps on Earth (1965) and Colonel Wolodyjowski (1969).

== Early life, family and education ==
Hoffman was born to Zygmunt Hoffman and Maria Schmelkes.

== Career ==
His 1965 film Three Steps on Earth was entered into the 4th Moscow International Film Festival where it won a Silver Prize. His 1969 film Colonel Wolodyjowski was entered into the 6th Moscow International Film Festival. In 1973 he was a member of the jury at the 8th Moscow International Film Festival. In 1981 he was a member of the jury at the 12th Moscow International Film Festival. In 1985 he was a member of the jury at the 14th Moscow International Film Festival.

Hoffman directed Battle of Warsaw 1920 in 2011, the first Polish 3D feature film, stating “The fact that Poles made a film in 3D is not a miracle”.

== Personal life ==
Hoffman is the father of early Macintosh development team member Joanna Hoffman.

== Selected filmography ==
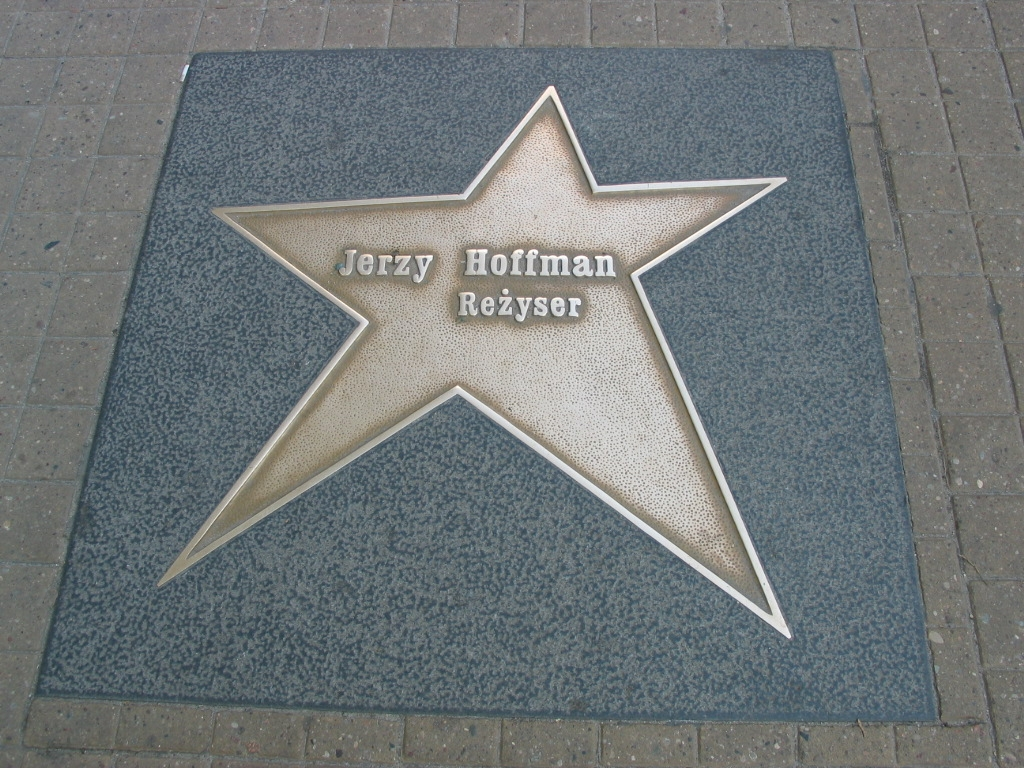
Jerzy Hoffman's star in Łódź

- Battle of Warsaw 1920 (2011)
- Ukraine - The Birth of a Nation (2008)
- An Ancient Tale (Stara Baśń, 2003)
- With Fire and Sword (Ogniem i mieczem, 1999)
- A Beautiful Stranger (Piękna nieznajoma, 1992)
- After Your Decrees (Wedle wyroków Twoich, 1983)
- The Quack (Znachor, 1981)
- To the Last Drop of Blood (Do krwi ostatniej, 1978)
- Leper (Trędowata, 1976)
- The Deluge (Potop, 1974) - nominated for a Best Foreign Film Oscar
- Colonel Wolodyjowski (Pan Wołodyjowski, 1969)
- The Father (Ojciec, 1967)
- The Market of Miracles (Jarmark cudów, 1966)
- Three Steps on Earth (1965)
- The Law and the Fist (Prawo i pięść, 1964)

== See also ==
- Cinema of Poland
- List of Polish-language films
- List of Polish Academy Award winners and nominees
- Museum of Communism, Poland
