= Edward Skórzewski =

Polish film director

- Born: 6 November 1930; Łódź, Poland
- Died: 8 November 1991 (aged 61); Warsaw, Poland
- Occupations: Film director, screenwriter
- Years active: 1954–1973

Edward Skórzewski (6 October 1930 – 8 October 1991) was a Polish film director and screenwriter. He directed 19 films between 1954 and 1973. His 1965 film Three Steps on Earth was entered into the 4th Moscow International Film Festival where it won a Silver Prize.

== Selected filmography ==
- Prawo i pięść (1964)
- Three Steps on Earth (1965)
