= Ewa Wiśniewska =

Polish actress (born 1942)

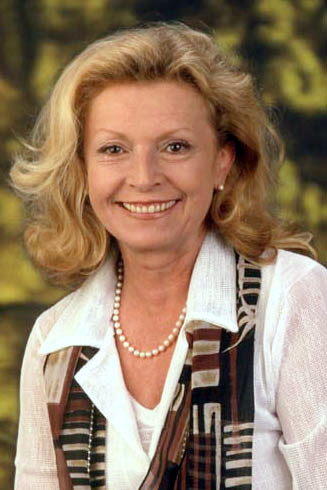
- Ewa Wiśniewska
- Born: 25 April 1942 (age 83); Warsaw, German-occupied Poland
- Years active: 1957–present

Ewa Maria Wiśniewska (born 25 April 1942) is a Polish actress. During her career, she won several awards, include two Polish Film Awards, Polish Film Festival Awards, and Złota Kaczka. She is also recipient of Order of Polonia Restituta and Gloria Artis Medal for Merit to Culture.

== Life and career ==
Wiśniewska was born and raised in Warsaw. Her sister, Małgorzata Niemirska, is also an actress. In 1963 she graduated from the Aleksander Zelwerowicz National Academy of Dramatic Art.

Wiśniewska made her big screen debut appearing in a minor role in the 1957 war drama film, Kanał directed by Andrzej Wajda. She later appeared in films Bad Luck (1960), Zbrodniarz i panna (1963), Prawo i pięść (1964), before playing the leading roles in Prawo i piesc, Zycie raz jeszcze, and Three Steps on Earth in 1965. On television, she appeared in spy series More Than Life At Stake, and played the lead in the drama series Doktor Ewa (1971). She spent most of her career appearing on stage productions. Wiśniewska played supporting roles in films such as What Will You Do When You Catch Me? (1978), The Issa Valley (1983), Memoirs of a Sinner (1985), Escape from the 'Liberty' Cinema (1990), With Fire and Sword (1999), The Hexer (2001), An Ancient Tale: When the Sun Was a God (2003) and Battle of Warsaw 1920 (2011). She played the lead in the 1986 adaptation of psychological novel Cudzoziemka, receiving Polish Film Festival Award for Best Actress.

Wiśniewska was awarded the Order of Polonia Restituta, one of Poland's highest Orders, and many other Orders, including Gold Cross of Merit.

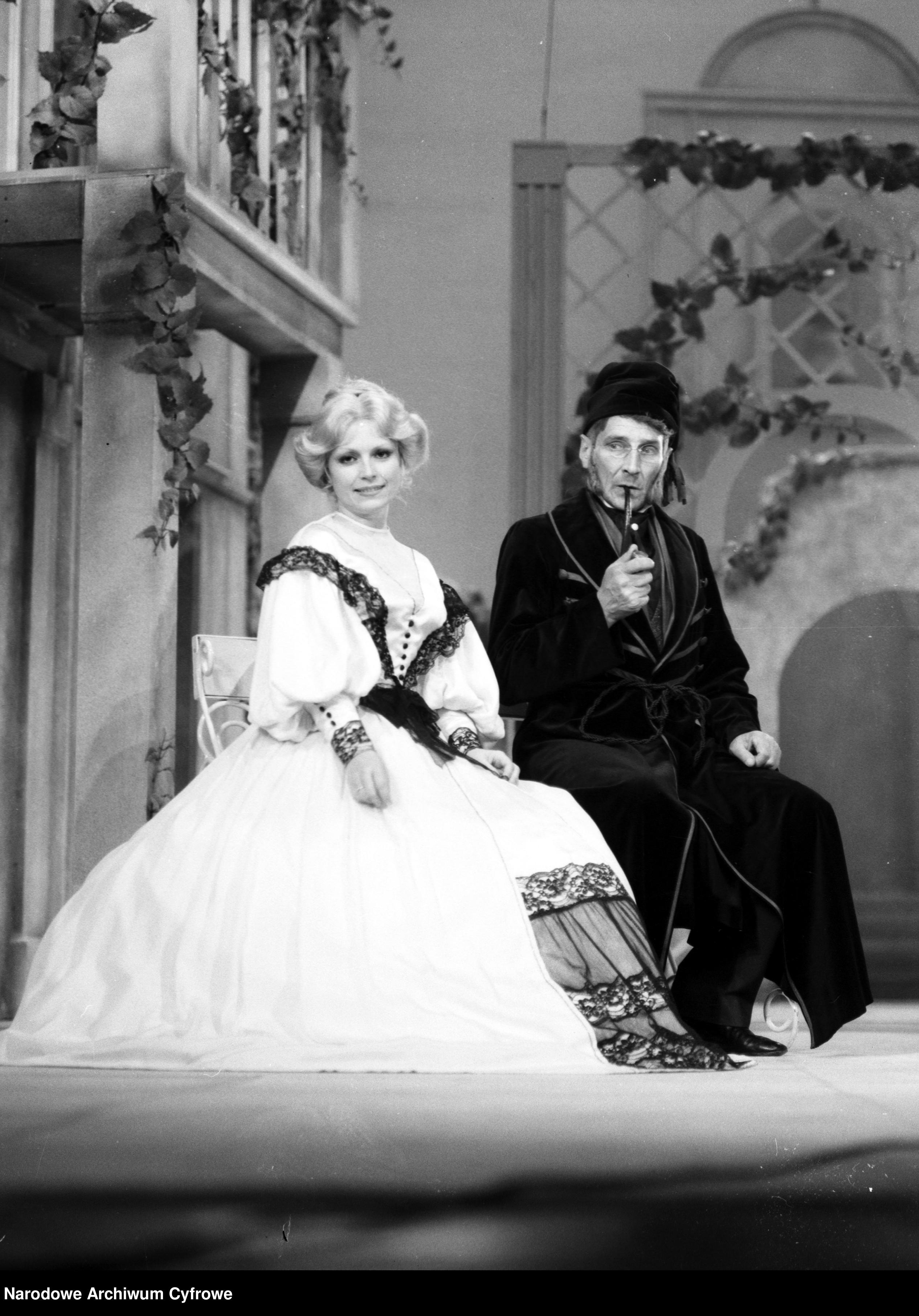
Wiśniewska and Tomasz Zaliwski in 1980

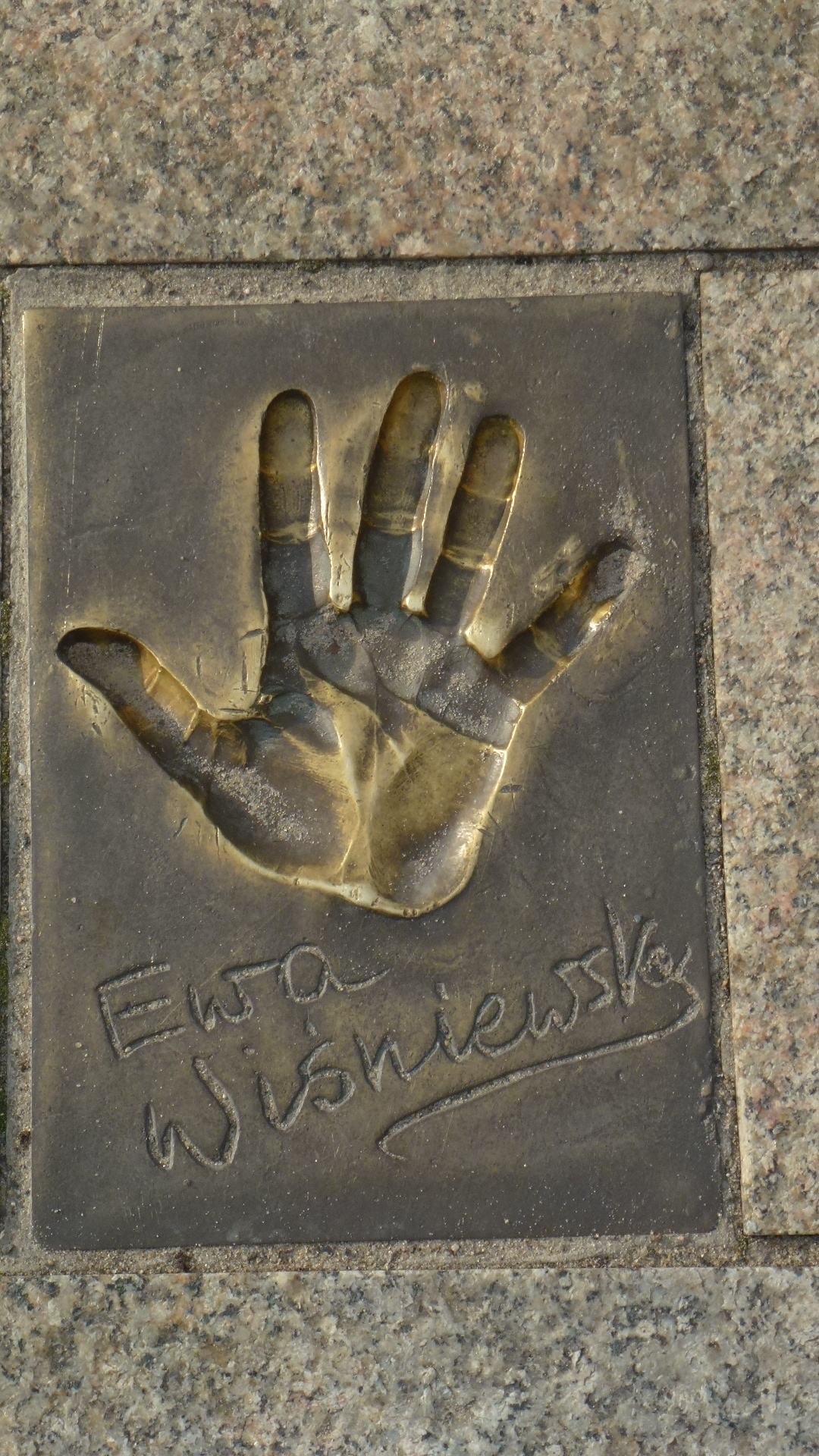
On Międzyzdroje Hall of Fame

== Selected filmography ==
- Zbrodniarz i panna (1963)
- Prawo i pięść (1964)
- Three Steps on Earth (1965)
- Sam pośród miasta (1965)
- Życie raz jeszcze (1965)
- Frozen Flashes (1967)
- Stawka większa niż życie (1967–1968, TV series)
- Tylko umarły odpowie (1969)
- Doktor Ewa (1970, TV series)
- Janosik (1973)
- What Will You Do When You Catch Me? (1978)
- Hallo Szpicbródka czyli ostatni występ króla kasiarzy (1978)
- Umarli rzucają cień (1978)
- Paciorki jednego różańca (1979)
- Głosy (1980)
- Białe tango (1981)
- Wielka majówka (1981)
- Dolina Issy (1982)
- Mgła (1983)
- Osobisty pamiętnik grzesznika przez niego samego spisany (1985)
- Cudzoziemka (1986)
- Dotknięci (1988)
- With Fire and Sword (1999)
- The Hexer (2001)
- An Ancient Tale: When the Sun Was a God (2003)
- Bitwa warszawska 1920 (2011)
