= Three Steps on Earth =

1965 film

- Directed by: Jerzy Hoffman; Edward Skórzewski
- Written by: Jerzy Hoffman; Edward Skórzewski; Jerzy Janicki; Józef Kuśmierek
- Starring: Irena Orska
- Cinematography: Władysław Forbert
- Release date: 3 September 1965
- Running time: 89 minutes
- Country: Poland
- Language: Polish

Three Steps on Earth (Polish: Trzy kroki po ziemi) is a 1965 Polish drama film directed by Jerzy Hoffman and Edward Skórzewski. It was entered into the 4th Moscow International Film Festival where it won a Silver Prize.

== Cast ==
- Irena Orska as Marysia Majchrowska (segment "Dzień urodzin")
- Tadeusz Fijewski as Aleksander Majchrowski (segment "Dzień urodzin")
- Anna Ciepielewska as Dr. Wysocka (segment "Godzina drogi")
- Ewa Wiśniewska as Anna Gościk (segment "Rozwód po polsku")
- Ludwik Pak as Ludwik Gościk (segment "Rozwód po polsku")
- Mieczysław Czechowicz as Szlenkiel (segment "Rozwód po polsku")
- Wiesław Michnikowski as Judge (segment "Rozwód po polsku")
- Kazimierz Rudzki as Advocate (segment "Rozwód po polsku")
- Henryk Bąk as Majchrowski's Friend (segment "Dzień urodzin")
- Bohdan Ejmont as Father (segment "Godzina drogi")
- Wiesław Gołas as Szkudlarek (segment "Dzień urodzin")
- Roman Kłosowski as Bystry (segment "Dzień urodzin")
- Bogumił Kobiela as Clerk (segment "Rozwód po polsku")
