= Bohdan Ejmont =

Polish actor (1928–2010)

- Born: 18 January 1928; Dolhinów, Poland (now Daŭhinava, Belarus)
- Died: 28 February 2010 (aged 82); Warsaw, Poland
- Occupation: Actor
- Years active: 1950-2002

Bohdan Ejmont (18 January 1928 – 28 February 2010) was a Polish actor. He appeared in more than 40 films and television shows between 1950 and 2002.

== Selected filmography ==
- Shadow (1956)
- Three Steps on Earth (1965)
- Westerplatte (1967)
- Czterdziestolatek (1974)
