= 4th Moscow International Film Festival =

Film festival

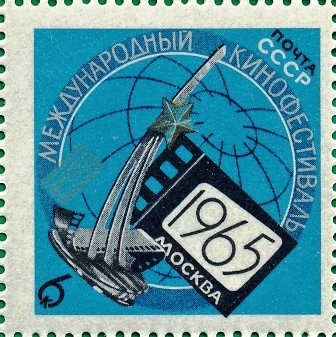
- USSR postage stamp No. 3229. 1965. feat. IV International Film Festival in Moscow
- Location: Moscow, Soviet Union
- Founded: 1959
- Awards: Grand Prix
- Festival date: 5–20 July 1965
- Website: http://www.moscowfilmfestival.ru

The 4th Moscow International Film Festival was held from 5 to 20 July 1965. The Grand Prix was shared between the Soviet film War and Peace directed by Sergei Bondarchuk and the Hungarian film Twenty Hours directed by Zoltán Fábri.

== Jury ==
- Sergei Gerasimov (USSR - President of the Jury)
- Veljko Bulajić (Yugoslavia)
- Zoltán Várkonyi (Hungary)
- Marina Vlady (France)
- Mircea Drăgan (Romania)
- Raj Kapoor (India)
- Grigori Kozintsev (USSR)
- Jiří Marek (Czechoslovakia)
- Czesław Petelski (Poland)
- Kiyohiko Ushihara (Japan)
- Leonardo Fioravanti (Italy)
- Fred Zinnemann (USA)
- Kamil Yarmatov (USSR)

== Films in competition ==
The following films were selected for the main competition:

English title	Original title	Director(s)	Production country
Acteón	Acteon	Jorge Grau	Spain
The White Moor	De-aș fi... Harap Alb	Ion Popescu-Gopo	Romania
The Great Race	The Great Race	Blake Edwards	United States
Marriage Italian-Style	Matrimonio all'italiana	Vittorio De Sica	Italy, France
War and Peace	Vojna i mir	Sergei Bondarchuk	Soviet Union
Twenty Hours	Husz ora	Zoltán Fábri	Hungary
Tine	Tine	Knud Leif Thomsen	Denmark
Darling	Darling	John Schlesinger	Great Britain
Friendship	Dosti	Satyen Bose	India
Friendship is Friendship	Friendship is Friendship	Dejidiin Jigjid	Mongolia
Driven from Paradise	طريد الفردوس, Tarid el firdaos	Fatin Abdel Wahab	Egypt
Love and Grudge	Aşk ve Kin	Turgut Demirağ	Turkey
My Home Is Copacabana	Mitt hem är Copacabana	Arne Sucksdorff	Sweden
The Young Soldier	Người Chiến Sĩ Trẻ	Hải Ninh, Nguyễn Đức Hinh	North Vietnam
The Young Will Live	O neoi theloun na zisoun	Nikos Tzimas	Greece
Heaven on One's Head	Le Ciel sur la tête	Yves Ciampi	France, Italy
No Man's Land	No Man's Land	A. Suravijaya	Indonesia
A Day in a Solar	Un día en el solar	Eduardo Manet	Cuba
The Camp Followers	Le soldatesse	Valerio Zurlini	Italy, Yugoslavia, France, West Germany
Father of a Soldier	Otets soldata	Rezo Chkheidze	Soviet Union
Atentát	Atentát	Jiří Sequens	Czechoslovakia
The Glass Cage	Ha-kluv hazehuhit	Philippe Arthuys	France, Israel
The Adventures of Werner Holt	Die Abenteuer des Werner Holt	Joachim Kunert	East Germany
Prometheus of the Island	Prometej s otoka Visevice	Vatroslav Mimica	Yugoslavia
The Sucker	Le Corniaud	Gérard Oury	France
Bull	Vula	Nikola Korabov	Bulgaria
Children Hand in Hand	Te o tsunagu kora	Susumu Hani	Japan
La pérgola de las flores	La pérgola de las flores	Román Viñoly Barreto	Argentina, Spain
Onnelliset leikit	Onnelliset leikit	Aito Mäkinen, Esko Elstelä	Finland
Three Steps on Earth	Trzy kroki po ziemi	Jerzy Hoffman, Edward Skórzewski	Poland
So Young a Peace	Al-salam al-walid	Jacques Charby	Algeria
Uncle Tom's Cabin	Onkel Toms Hütte	Géza von Radványi	West Germany, France, Italy, Yugoslavia
4x4	4x4	Palle Kjærulff-Schmidt, Klaus Rifbjerg, Rolf Clemens, Maunu Kurkvaara, Jan Troell	Denmark, Norway, Finland, Sweden
Bergwind	Sturm am Wilden Kaiser	Eduard von Borsody	Austria

== Awards ==
- Grand Prix:
  - War and Peace and Sergei Bondarchuk
  - Twenty Hours and Zoltán Fábri
- Golden Prizes:
  - Heaven on One's Head by Yves Ciampi
  - Atentát by Jiří Sequens
- Special Silver Prize: The Camp Followers by Valerio Zurlini
- Silver Prizes:
  - Three Steps on Earth by Jerzy Hoffman and Edward Skórzewski
  - The Great Race by Blake Edwards
- Prizes:
  - Best Actor: Sergo Zakariadze for Father of a Soldier
  - Best Actress: Sophia Loren for Marriage Italian-Style
  - Best Director: Ion Popescu-Gopo for The White Moor
  - Director of Photography: Tomislav Pinter for Prometheus of the Island
  - So Young a Peace by Jacques Charby
  - The Adventures of Werner Holt by Joachim Kunert
  - Bull by Nikola Korabov
- Special Diplomas:
  - Director: Susumu Hani for Children Hand in Hand
  - Director: Vatroslav Mimica for Prometheus of the Island
  - Actor: Bourvil for The Sucker
  - 4x4 by Palle Kjærulff-Schmidt, Klaus Rifbjerg, Rolf Clemens, Maunu Kurkvaara, Jan Troell
- Diplomas:
  - Actress: Ludmila Savelyeva for War and Peace
  - Actress: Julie Christie for Darling
- Prix FIPRESCI:
  - Twenty Hours and Zoltán Fábri
  - Dvoye by Mikhail Bogin
