= Jacques Charby =

- Born: 13 June 1929; Paris, France
- Died: 1 January 2006 (aged 76); Paris, France
- Occupations: Actor, director, writer
- Years active: 1956–2000

Jacques Charby (13 June 1929 – 1 January 2006) was a French actor, director, writer, and outspoken activist against colonialism during the Algerian War. A member of the Réseau Jeanson or Jeanson network, he cooperated with Algeria's National Liberation Front in the fight for Algerian independence. He also wrote the first feature-length film chronicling Algerian Independence, entitled So Young a Peace, which was entered into the 4th Moscow International Film Festival.

== Life and work ==
Charby was born Jacques Charbit in Paris.
