= Driven from Paradise =

1965 film

- Directed by: Fatin Abdel Wahab
- Starring: Farid Shawqi
- Release date: 1965
- Running time: 100 minutes
- Country: Egypt
- Language: Arabic

Driven from Paradise (Arabic: طريد الفردوس, translit. Tarid el firdaos) is a 1965 Egyptian drama film directed by Fatin Abdel Wahab. It participated in the 4th Moscow International Film Festival.

== Cast ==
- Farid Shawqi
- Samira Ahmed
- Mohammed Tawfik
- Nagwa Fouad
- Aziza Helmy
