= The Boy on the Galloping Horse =

2006 Polish film

- Film poster
- Directed by: Adam Guziński
- Written by: Adam Guziński; Tarjei Vesaas
- Produced by: Lukasz Dzieciol; Piotr Dzieciol
- Starring: Piotr Bajor
- Cinematography: Jolanta Dylewska
- Edited by: Jarosław Kamiński
- Release date: May 2006
- Running time: 75 minutes
- Country: Poland
- Language: Polish

The Boy on the Galloping Horse (Polish: Chłopiec na galopującym koniu) is a 2006 Polish drama film directed by Adam Guziński. It was screened out of competition at the 2006 Cannes Film Festival.

== Cast ==
- Piotr Bajor - Jerzy
- Aleksandra Justa - Maria
- Krzysztof Lis - Janek
- Krzysztof Radkowski - Tomasz
- Bartlomiej Bobrowski - Young Writer
- Danuta Borsuk
- Alicja Gasior - Girl in the Shop
- Malgorzata Hajewska - Shopkeeper
- Marta Kalmus
- Marek Kasprzyk - Receptionist
- Wladyslaw Kowalski - Ward Manager
- Tadeusz Madeja - Old Man
- Stanislaw Penksyk - Bus Driver
- Anna Sarna
- Teresa Sawicka - Nurse
- Anna Seniuk - Nurse
