= Memoirs of a Sinner =

- Directed by: Wojciech Jerzy Has
- Written by: Michal Komar
- Based on: The Private Memoirs and Confessions of a Justified Sinner by James Hogg
- Starring: Piotr Bajor; Maciej Kozłowski; Janusz Michalowski; Hanna Stankówna; Ewa Wiśniewska
- Cinematography: Grzegorz Kedzierski
- Edited by: Barbara Lewandowska-Conio and Wanda Zeman
- Music by: Jerzy Maksymiuk
- Distributed by: Zespol Filmowy "Rondo"
- Release date: 20 October 1986
- Running time: 114 minutes
- Country: Poland
- Language: Polish

Memoirs of a Sinner (Polish: Osobisty pamiętnik grzesznika przez niego samego spisany) is a 1986 Polish film directed by Wojciech Has, starring Piotr Bajor. The film is an adaptation of James Hogg's The Private Memoirs and Confessions of a Justified Sinner (1824) and tells the tale of the protagonist Robert and his doppelganger.

== Premise ==
Robert (Piotr Bajor) is exhumed from the grave by a gang of grave robbers and is forced to recount his life story - a struggle between good and evil, embodied in his doppelganger whom he eventually kills.

== Cast ==
- Piotr Bajor as Robert
- Maciej Kozłowski as Stranger
- Janusz Michałowski as Pastor
- Hanna Stankówna as Rabina
- Ewa Wiśniewska as Laura
- Franciszek Pieczka as Logan
- Anna Dymna as Dominika
- Katarzyna Figura as Cyntia
- Jan Jankowski as Gustaw
- Jan Pawel Kruk as Guard
- Andrzej Krukowski
- Zdzislaw Kuzniar
- Zofia Merle
- Jerzy Zygmunt Nowak as Samuel
- Elwira Romanczuk as Malgorzata

== Production ==
The film was filmed in the village of Klęk in the Polish province of Łódź.

== Release ==
The film was released on 20 October 1986. Jerzy Maksymiuk's score won the award for Best Score at the 1986 Polish Film Festival.

== Comparison with the book ==
Has maintains the strangeness central to the novel, although he tends to focus on the creation of unease, intrigue and beautiful images rather than Hogg's satire on Calvinist predestination.

== See also ==
- Cinema of Poland
- List of Polish language films
