= Dov Ben-Meir =

Israeli politician (1927–2020)

- דב בן-מאיר
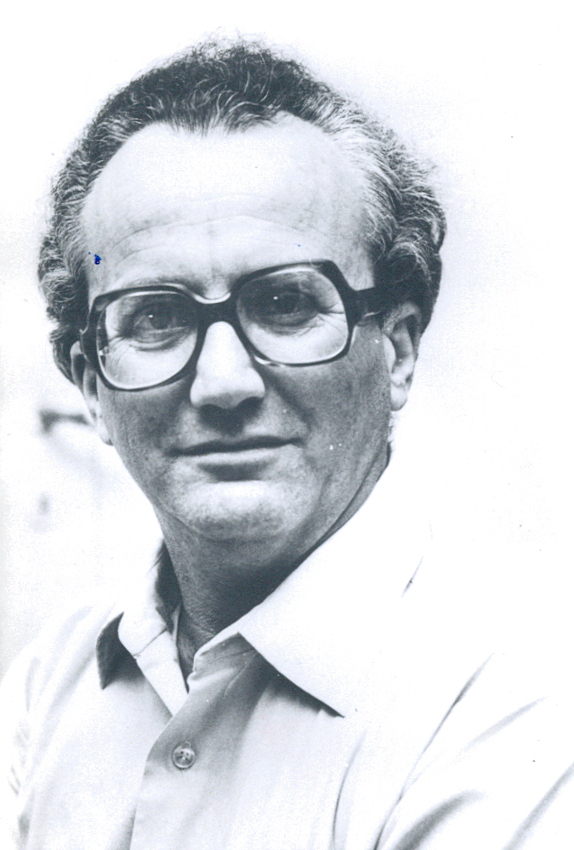
- Ben-Meir in the 1980s

Faction represented in the Knesset
- 1981–1988: Alignment

Personal details
- Born: 11 August 1927; Ciechocinek, Poland
- Died: 21 March 2020 (aged 92); Tel Aviv, Israel

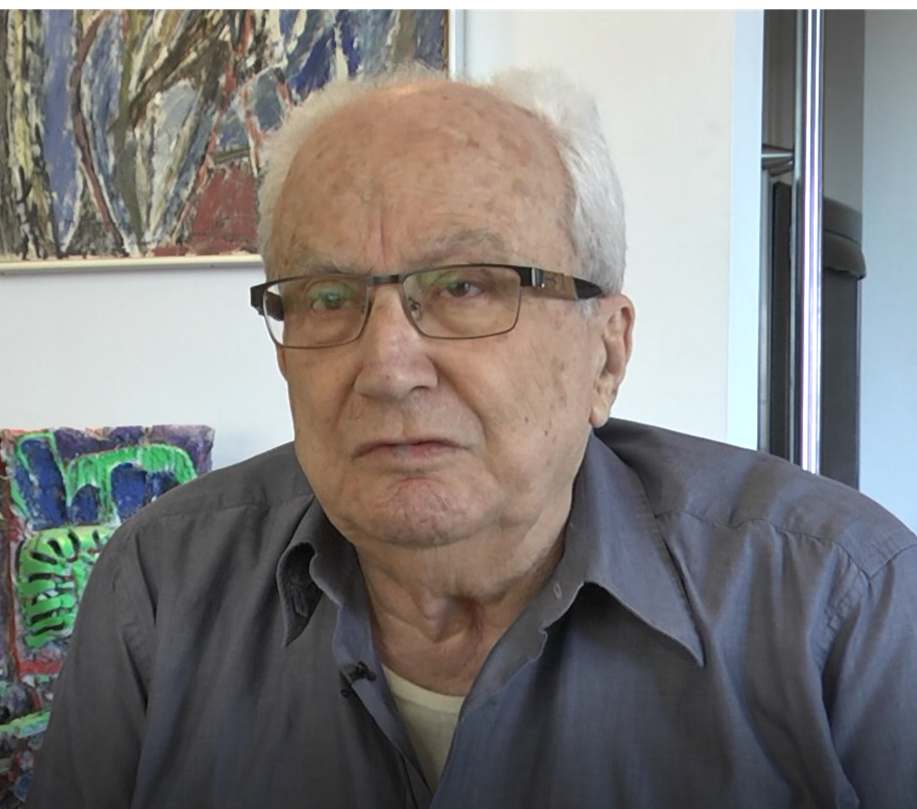
Ben-Meir in 2016

Dov Ben-Meir (Hebrew: דב בן-מאיר; 11 August 1927 – 21 March 2020) was an Israeli politician who served as a member of the Knesset for the Alignment between 1981 and 1988.

== Biography ==
Born Dov Zucker in Ciechocinek in Poland in 1927, Ben-Meir emigrated to Mandatory Palestine in 1935. He attended the Pardes Hanna Agricultural High School, and later studied for a BA in economics and political science at the Hebrew University of Jerusalem.

In 1947 he was amongst the founders of kibbutz Ma'ayan Barukh, where he lived until 1953. He was also a member of the Meuhedet movement, and was amongst its national leadership until 1954. In that year he became director of the Publications Service in the Prime Minister's Office, where he worked until 1962. In 1962 he founded the Israeli Cancer Association, and served as its director general until 1967.

A member of the Labor Party, he chaired its Tel Aviv branch from 1970 until 1976. He was also chairman of the Tel Aviv branch of the Histadrut, and from 1976 until 1983 was a member of its national management. In 1981 he was elected to the Knesset on the Alignment list (an alliance of the Labor Party and Mapam). In 1983 he became first deputy mayor of Tel Aviv. The following year he was re-elected to the Knesset, but lost his seat in the 1988 elections.

Between 1989 and 1990 he worked as an advisor on promoting ties with German-speaking countries for Minister of Finance Shimon Peres. Since then he worked as an economic advisor to German companies doing business in Israel, for the Palestinian National Authority and Jordan. He was also a senior lecturer at the Beit Berl college, the Labor Productivity Institute and the R&D institute at the Technion.
