= Adam Guziński =

Polish film director

- Born: 22 December 1970 (age 55); Konin, Poland
- Occupations: Film director, screenwriter
- Years active: 1997-present

Adam Guziński (born 22 December 1970) is a Polish film director and screenwriter. His film Chłopiec na galopującym koniu was screened out of competition at the 2006 Cannes Film Festival.

== Filmography ==
- Jakub (1997)
- Antychryst (2002)
- Chłopiec na galopującym koniu (2006)
