= Susumu Hani =

Japanese film director, screenwriter (born 1928)

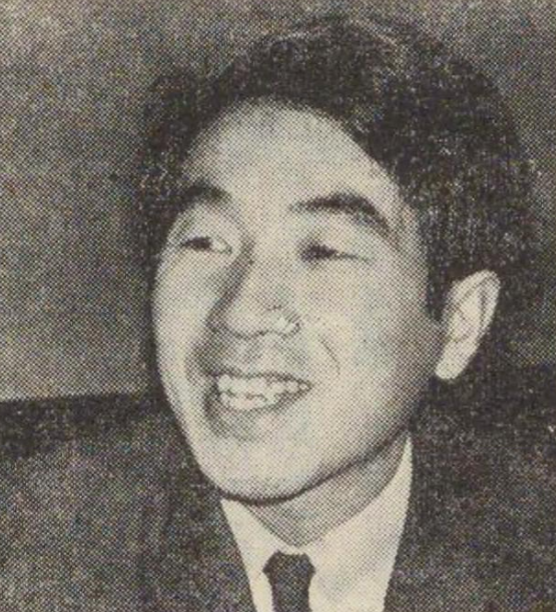
- Born: October 10, 1928 (age 98); Tokyo
- Occupation: Film director
- Spouse: Sachiko Hidari (m. 1959; div. 1977)

Susumu Hani (羽仁 進, Hani Susumu; born 10 October 1928) is a Japanese film director, and one of the most prominent representatives of the 1960s Japanese New Wave. Born in Tokyo, he has directed both documentaries and feature films.

He won the Directors Guild of Japan New Directors Award for his first fiction film, Bad Boys, in 1961. His 1962 film Mitasareta seikatsu was entered into the 12th Berlin International Film Festival. His 1963 documentary film Children Hand in Hand was entered into the 4th Moscow International Film Festival winning him a Special Diploma.

One of his most famous films is Nanami: The Inferno of First Love (初恋・地獄篇 - Hatsukoi Jigokuhen, 1968), which Hani co-scripted with Shūji Terayama.

== Filmography ==
- Bad Boys (1961)
- Mitasareta seikatsu (1962)
- Kanojo to kare (1963)
- Children Hand in Hand (1963)
- Bwana Toshi no uta (1967)
- Nanami: The Inferno of First Love (1968)
- Aido: Slave of Love (1969)
- Yōsei no Uta (1972)
- A Tale of Africa (1980)
- Yogen (1982)
