= Piotr Bajor =

Polish actor

- Born: 16 February 1960 (age 66); Opole, Poland
- Occupation: Actor
- Years active: 1981–present

Piotr Bajor (born 16 February 1960) is a Polish film actor. He starred in the film Chłopiec na galopującym koniu, which was screened out of competition at the 2006 Cannes Film Festival.

== Filmography ==
- Memoirs of a Sinner (1986)
- The Boy on the Galloping Horse (2006)
