= Battle of Warsaw 1920 =

2011 Polish historical film directed by Jerzy Hoffman

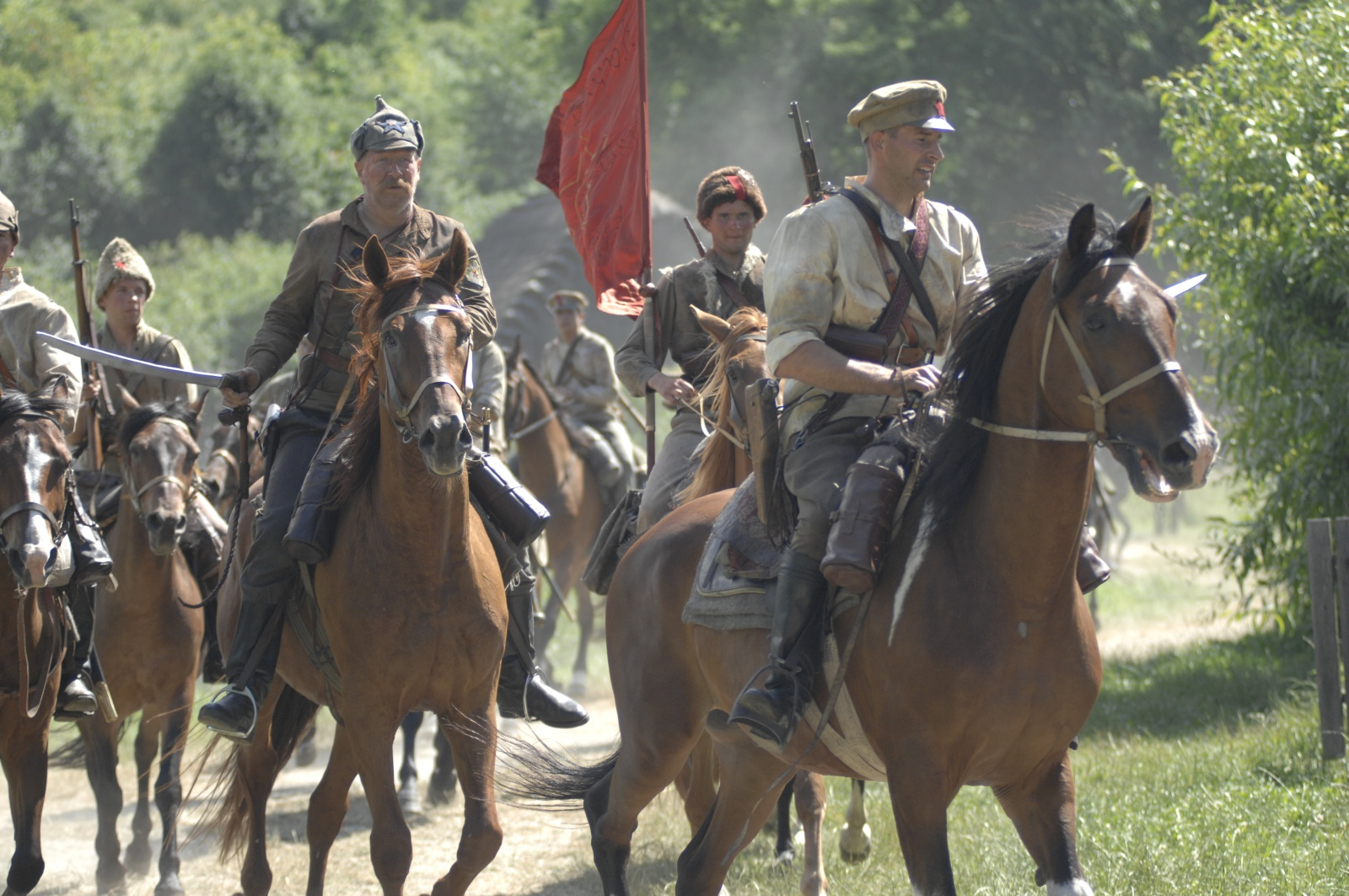
- Production
- Directed by: Jerzy Hoffman
- Written by: Jarosław Sokół; Jerzy Hoffman
- Produced by: Jerzy R. Michaluk
- Starring: Borys Szyc; Natasza Urbańska; Daniel Olbrychski
- Cinematography: Sławomir Idziak
- Music by: Krzesimir Dębski
- Production company: Zodiak Jerzy Hoffman Film Production Sp. z o.o.
- Distributed by: Forum Film Poland
- Release date: 26 September 2011
- Country: Poland
- Languages: Polish, Russian, Belarusian
- Budget: $9 million
- Box office: $8,417,043

Battle of Warsaw 1920 (pol. Bitwa warszawska 1920) is a Polish historical film directed by Jerzy Hoffman depicting the events of the Battle of Warsaw (1920) of the Polish–Soviet War. It was released in September 2011. It was filmed in 3D using the Fusion Camera System and is one of the most expensive movies in the history of cinema in Poland.

== Plot ==
1920. After regaining independence, Poland is now seeking to stabilize the situation on the border. Marshal Józef Piłsudski (Daniel Olbrychski) wants to create federations of independent states in the east. Polish authorities announce mobilization. Jan Krynicki (Borys Szyc), a young poet with leftist views, returns to the army. On the day of leaving for the war, he marries Ola (Natasza Urbańska), a beautiful actress from the revue theater. Soon Poles manage to conquer Kiev. Shortly thereafter, Jan, stationed in Ukraine, is accused of Bolshevik agitation and sentenced to death. He is unexpectedly saved from shooting by an attack by the Bolsheviks, who take him captive. After conversations with Commissioner Bykowski (Adam Ferency), Jan finally sees the real calculations of the Red Revolution. In Warsaw, meanwhile, Ola is disturbed by Captain Kostrzewa (Jerzy Bończak). She decides to join the army to help defend the capital against the Bolsheviks constantly pushing west.

== Cast ==
- Daniel Olbrychski as Józef Piłsudski
- Borys Szyc as Jan Krynicki
- Natasza Urbańska as Ola Raniewska
- Marian Dziędziel as general Tadeusz Rozwadowski
- Bogusław Linda as major Bolesław Wieniawa-Długoszowski
- Jerzy Bończak as capitan Kostrzewa
- Ewa Wiśniewska as Ada
- Stanisława Celińska as Zdzisia
- Adam Ferency as Bykowski
- Olga Kabo as Sofia Nikołajewna
- Jacek Poniedziałek as Józef Haller
- Łukasz Garlicki as priest Ignacy Skorupka
- Wojciech Solarz as Samuel
- Piotr Głowacki as Anatol
- Andrzej Strzelecki as Wincenty Witos
- Wiktor Zborowski as Charles de Gaulle
- Wojciech Pszoniak as general Maxime Weygand
- Bartosz Opania as colonel Bolesław Jaźwiński
- Nikołaj Ortynski as a Bolshevik commander
- Aleksandr Domogarov as sotnik Kryshkin
- Dariusz Biskupski as Ratajczak
- Ewa Wencel as Więcławska
- Marek Kossakowski as Jones
- Artur Owczarek as American journalist
- Dariusz Kordek as Władysław Sikorski
- Michał Żebrowski as Władysław Grabski
- Aleksandr Khoshabaev as Mikhail Tukhachevsky
- Grażyna Szapołowska as Korwin-Piotrowska
- Igor Guzun as Joseph Stalin
- Wiktor Bałabanow as Vladimir Lenin
- Zdzisław Szymborski as announcer
- Jarosław Boberek as Paproch
- Janusz Sieniawski as Sowa
- Krzysztof Dracz as Leon Trotsky
- Mateusz Banasiuk as a soldier
