= Onnelliset leikit =

1964 film

- Original Finnish film poster
- Directed by: Aito Mäkinen; Esko Elstelä
- Written by: Aito Mäkinen; Esko Elstelä; Satu Waltari
- Produced by: Risto Orko
- Starring: Pirkko Peltonen
- Production company: Suomi-Filmi
- Release date: 6 November 1964
- Running time: 96 minutes
- Country: Finland
- Language: Finnish

Onnelliset leikit (also known as Happy Games in English) is a 1964 Finnish comedy film directed by Aito Mäkinen and Esko Elstelä. It was entered into the 4th Moscow International Film Festival.

== Cast ==
- Pirkko Peltonen (segment "Juulia")
- Raimo Nenonen (segment "Juulia")
- Riitta Elstelä as Mother (segment "Tikku")
- Lasse Liemola as Father (segment "Tikku")
- Eeva Elstelä as Daughter (segment "Tikku")
- Saara Elstelä as Daughter (segment "Tikku")
- Joel Elstelä as Son (segment "Tikku")
- Tuija Hulkko
- Etta-Liisa Kunnas
- Ritva Vepsä
