= Esko Elstelä =

Finnish screenwriter

- Born: 15 November 1931; Pori, Finland
- Died: 30 September 2007 (aged 75); Helsinki, Finland
- Occupations: Screenwriter, film director
- Years active: 1961-1976

Esko Elstelä (15 November 1931 – 30 September 2007) was a Finnish screenwriter and film director. His 1964 film Onnelliset leikit was entered into the 4th Moscow International Film Festival. Elstelä worked as a director at the Finnish National Theatre from 1974 to 1994. He also translated many plays into Finnish.

== Selected filmography ==
- Onnelliset leikit (1964)
