= Aido: Slave of Love =

1969 film

- Directed by: Susumu Hani
- Screenplay by: Susumu Hani; Isamu Kurita
- Story by: Isamu Kurita
- Starring: Yuri Suemasa
- Cinematography: Yuji Okumura
- Music by: Teizo Muramatsu
- Production company: Hani
- Distributed by: Shochiku
- Release date: 24 May 1969
- Running time: 105 minutes
- Country: Japan
- Language: Japanese

Aido: Slave of Love (愛奴) is a 1969 Japanese film directed by Susumu Hani. It was entered into the 19th Berlin International Film Festival.

== Plot ==
Aido is a beautiful woman cursed with an insatiable appetite for coitus. After an affair with a young student, she engages in several other affairs in which she can no longer tell fantasy from reality.

== Cast ==
- Yuri Suemasa (末政百合) as Aido (愛奴)
- Kenzō Kawarazaki (河原崎建三) as Shūsei Saiki (斎木秀生)
- Kimiko Nukamura (額村喜美子) as Madame Enjōji (円城寺夫人)
- Rumiko Tanuma (田沼瑠美子) as Yōko (燿子)
- Kenzaburō Shirai (白井健三郎) as Professor
- Takamitsu Masuda (増田増田貴光) as Yamamoto (山本)
- Jusaburō Tsujimura (辻村寿三郎) as Detective Iwashita (岩下)
- Kiyoko Ōta (太田喜代子) as Harumi (波留美)
- Akira Matsumoto (松本章) as Man
- Kyōji Kokonoe (九重京司) as Mr. Sano (佐野)

== Release ==
Aido: Slave of Love was released in Japan on 24 May 1969 and was distributed by Shochiku.

== Legacy ==
The film is one of Hani's internationally most renowned features.
