= Ciechocinek =

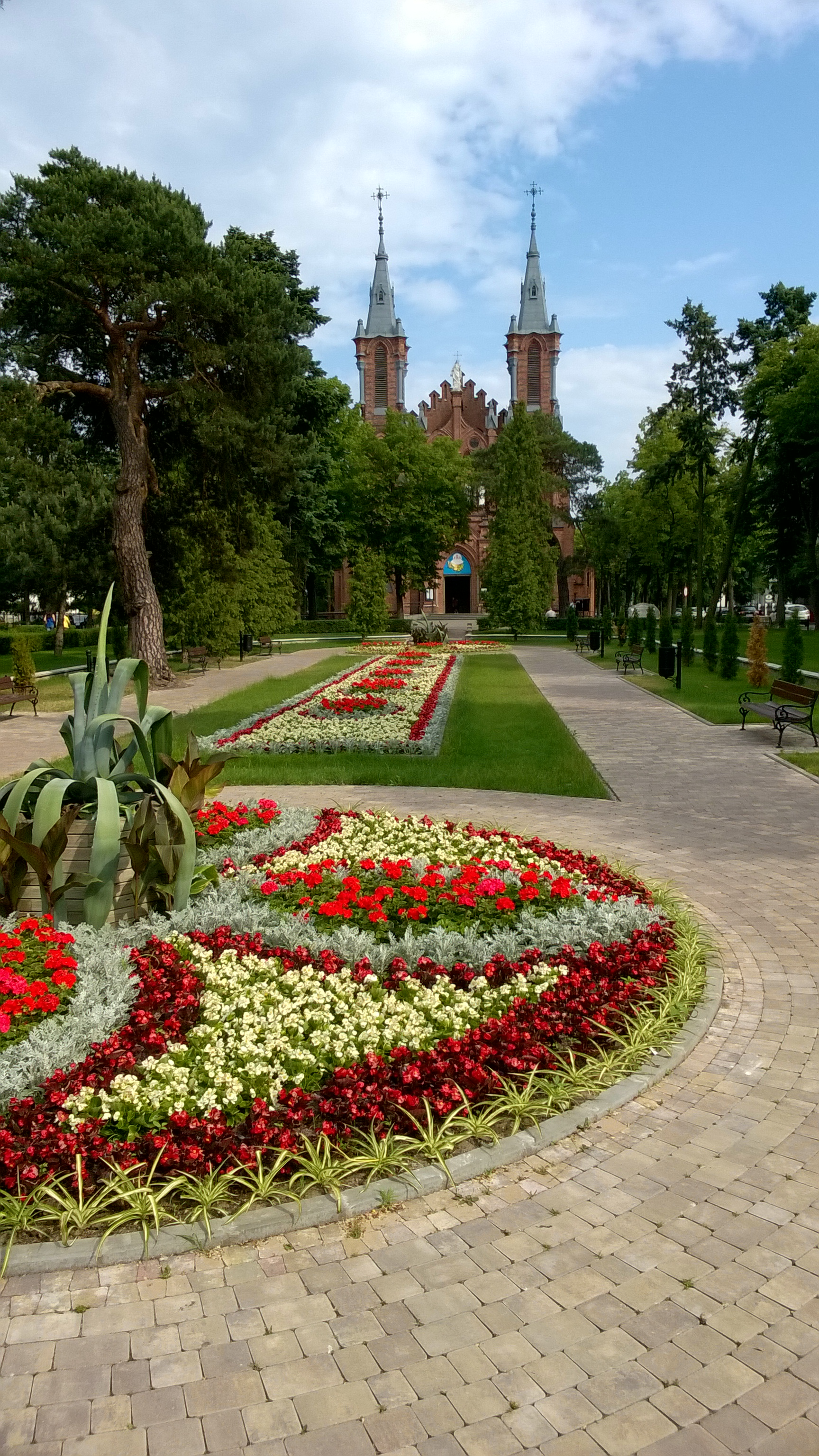
- Spa Park

- Flag Coat of arms

- Location within Poland
- Coordinates: 52°53′N 18°47′E
- Country: Poland
- Voivodeship: Kuyavian-Pomeranian
- County: Aleksandrów
- Gmina: Ciechocinek (urban gmina)

Government
  - Mayor: Leszek Mirosław Dzierżewicz

Area
  - Total: 15.3 km^{2} (5.9 sq mi)
- Elevation: 40 m (130 ft)

Population (31 December 2021)
  - Total: 10,442
  - Density: 682/km^{2} (1,770/sq mi)
- Time zone: UTC+1 (CET)
  - Summer (DST): UTC+2 (CEST)
- Postal code: 87-720 to 87-722
- Area code: +48 54
- Vehicle registration: CAL
- Website: http://www.ciechocinek.pl

Historic Monument of Poland
- Designated: 2017-11-22
- Part of: Ciechocinek – complex of graduation towers and salt boiling facilities with the Graduation and Spa Parks
- Reference no.: Dz. U., 2017, No. 2276

Ciechocinek (Polish pronunciation: [t͡ɕɛxɔˈt͡ɕinɛk]; ) is a spa town in Kuyavian-Pomeranian Voivodeship, north-central Poland, located on the Vistula River. It is located within the historic region of Kuyavia. As of December 2021, the town has a population of 10,442.

Ciechocinek is known for the world's longest Ciechocinek graduation towers. Experts have considered the local saline springs to be of extreme value and named the thermal spring no. 14 "a wonder of nature". The therapeutic qualities of these springs are directed toward curing cardiovascular, respiratory, orthopedic, traumatic, rheumatic, nervous system and women's diseases.

== History ==
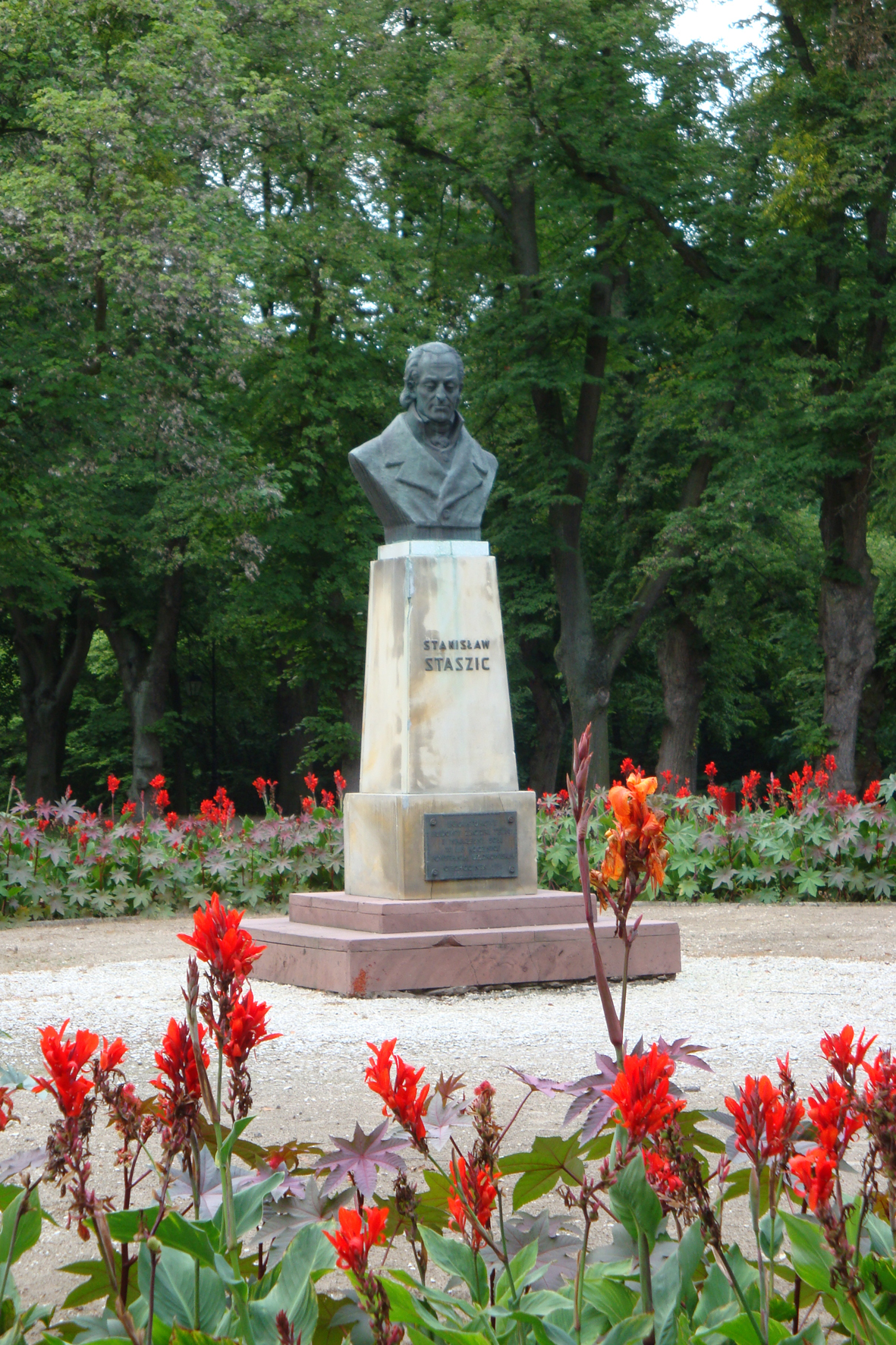
Monument of Stanisław Staszic in Park Tężniowy (Graduation Park)

The history of Ciechocinek dates back to the Middle Ages. It belonged to the Kingdom of Poland until the Second Partition of Poland in 1793, when it was annexed by Prussia. It 1807 it became part of the short-lived Polish Duchy of Warsaw, and in 1815 it became part of Congress Poland, initially autonomous within the Russian Empire, from 1844 on as part of the Warsaw Governorate. When Wieliczka and Bochnia, towns rich in salt deposits, fell in the First Partition of Poland to Austria, the salt resources of Ciechocinek and nearby Słońsk drew the attention of Polish officials. On the initiative of Stanisław Staszic, a salt extraction project was created. The development of the spa plant and health resort in Ciechocinek dates back to 1836. In 1867 Ciechocinek gained a railway connection with Bydgoszcz and Warsaw. The rapid development and popularity among guests from home and abroad contributed to the granting of town rights in 1916.

After Poland regained independence after World War I in 1918, the spa was taken over by the Polish Government and subordinated to the Ministry of Health. During this period, healing facilities destroyed during the war were rebuilt, new pensions, a post office, school, a residential and commercial complex, the President's Manor House and other facilities were built. The Health Park was also created, consisting of a thermal-saline pool, the Jordan Garden, a sports field and vast green areas surrounding the graduation towers.

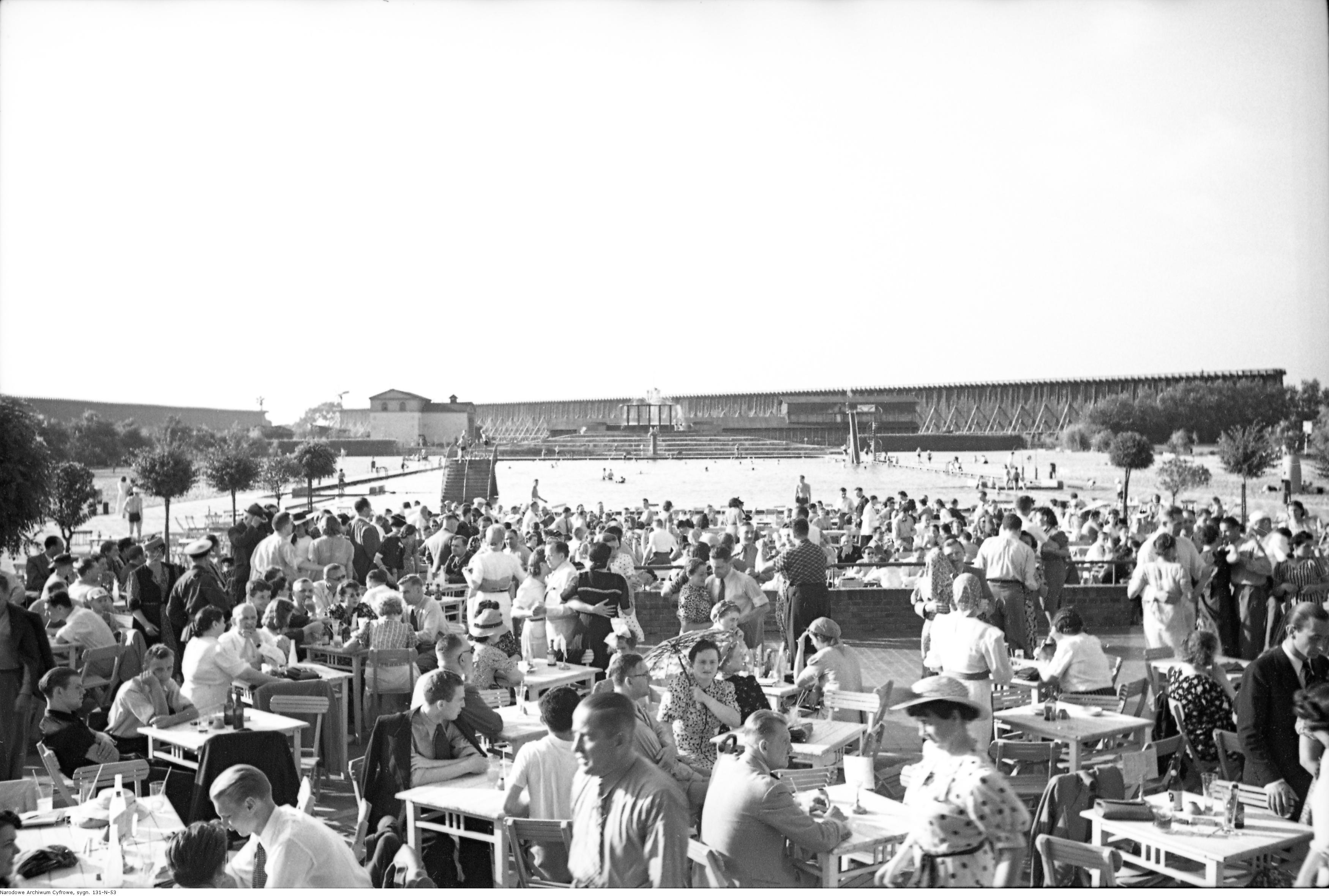
Spa guests in Ciechocinek with graduation towers in the background in interwar Poland

Following the invasion of Poland at the beginning of the Second World War, Ciechocinek was occupied by Nazi Germany on 12 September 1939 and on 26 September incorporated into the Reichsgau Wartheland as part of the district/county (kreis) of Hermannsbad (1941–1945). The Polish population was subjected to various crimes including mass arrests, murder and expulsions. During the German invasion, in September 1939, the Wehrmacht and Selbstschutz murdered some inhabitants of Ciechocinek in the nearby village of Koneck, and from October 1939 to January 1940, the Germans carried out massacres of many Poles from Ciechocinek in the nearby Odolion forest (see Nazi crimes against the Polish nation). In addition, in 1939 and 1940, Germans expelled approximately 640 Poles, especially the intelligentsia and owners of shops, workshops and offices, which were then handed over to German colonists as part of the Lebensraum policy. During the occupation the town functioned as a military hospital for German troops and also as a health resort, only for German citizens. 80% of the town's Jews fled before or shortly after the German occupation. In 1940, 120 Jews were confined to a ghetto, the young ones were sent to a forced labor camp at Inowrocław in 1941, and the older ones were sent to be murdered at Chelmno on April 19, 1942. The town was liberated from occupation in January 1945. It managed to avoid significant damage.

In early 2018, a Tesla Supercharger opened, making it the fourth opened in Poland.

== Sports ==
The local football club is Zdrój Ciechocinek. It competes in the lower leagues.

== Notable residents ==
- Dov Ben-Meir (born Dov Zucker; 1927-2020), Israeli politician

== Gallery ==
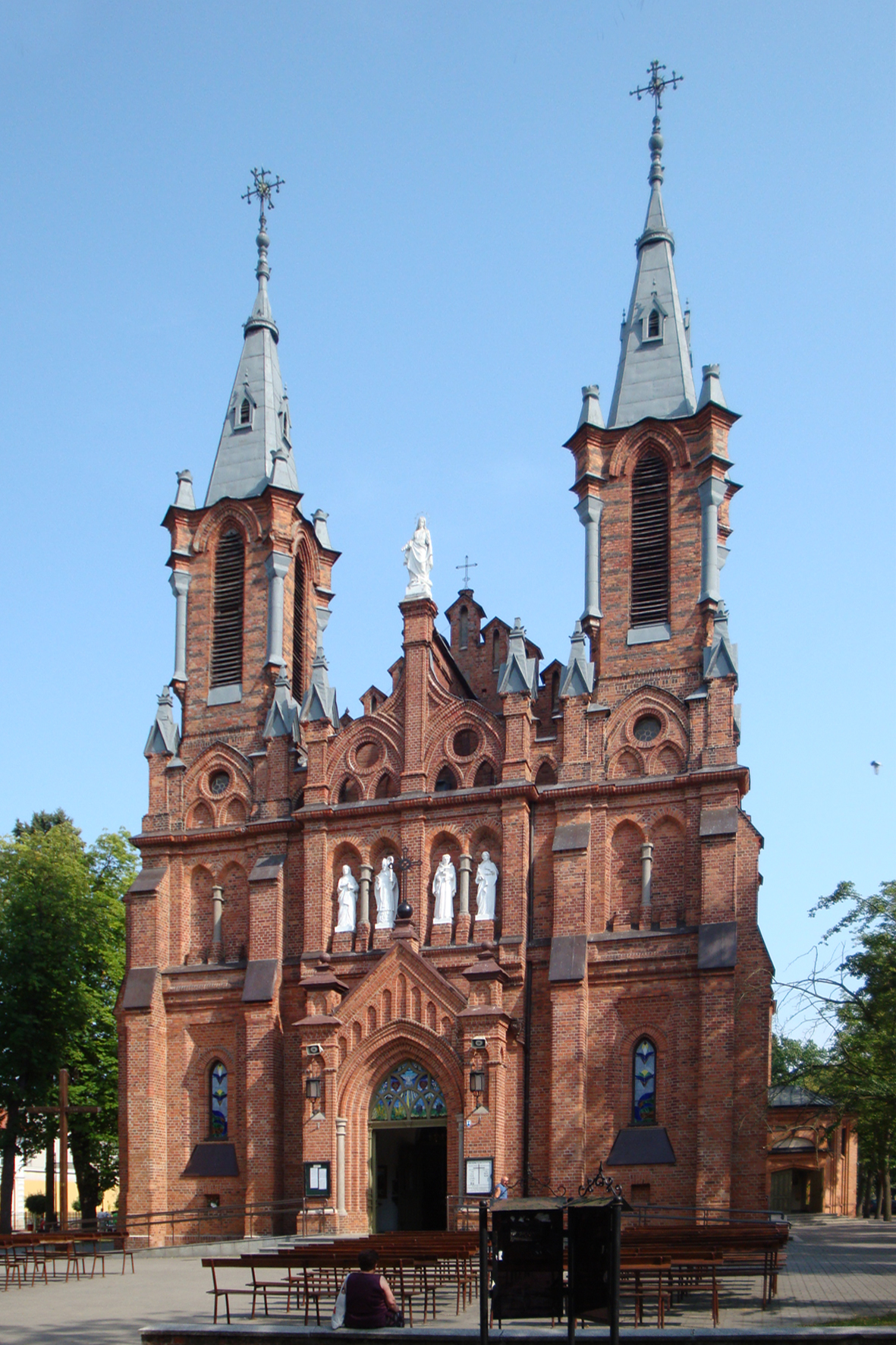
Neo-Gothic Saints Peter and Paul's Church

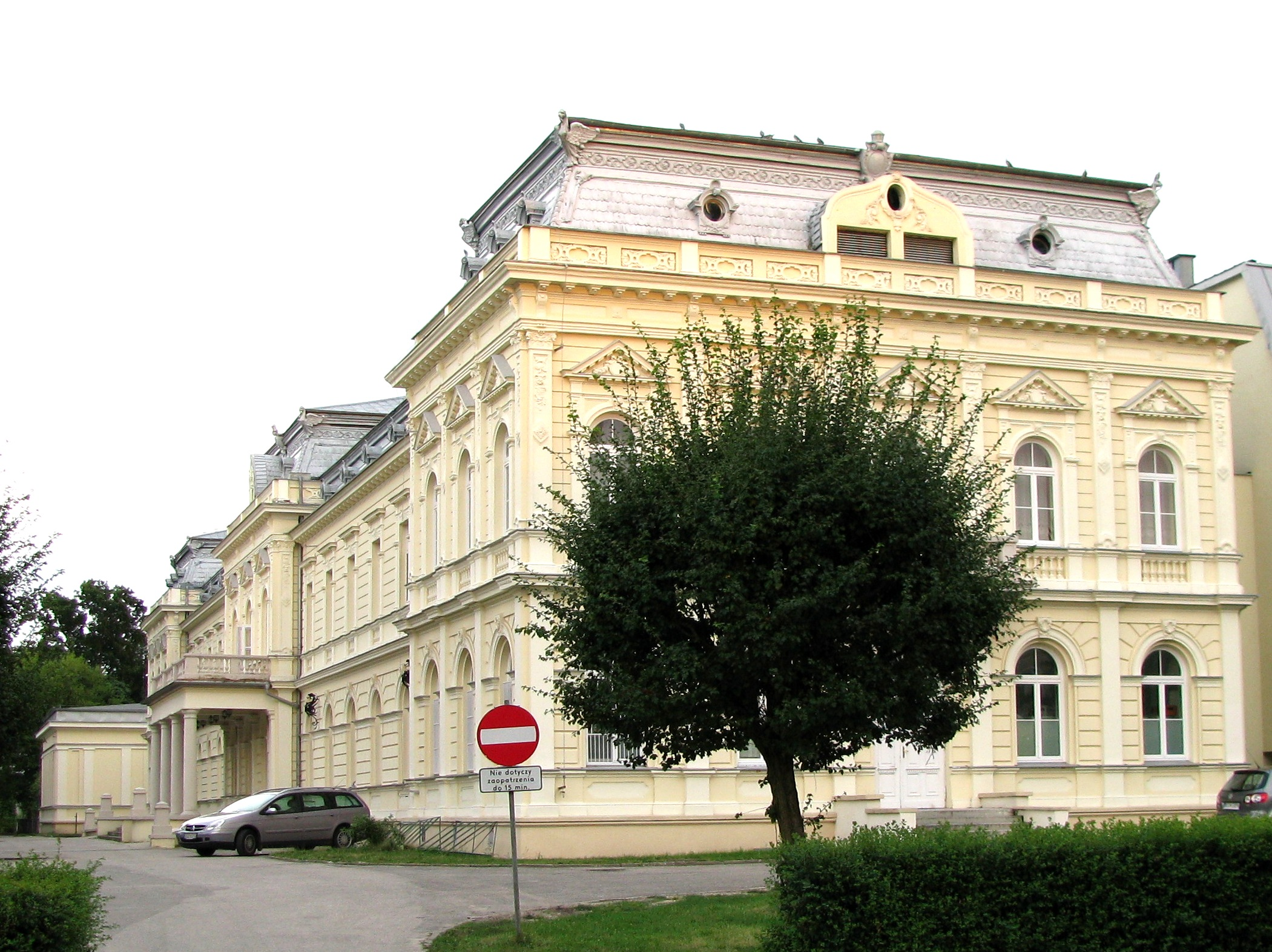
Łazienki No.4 (Health Spa Building)

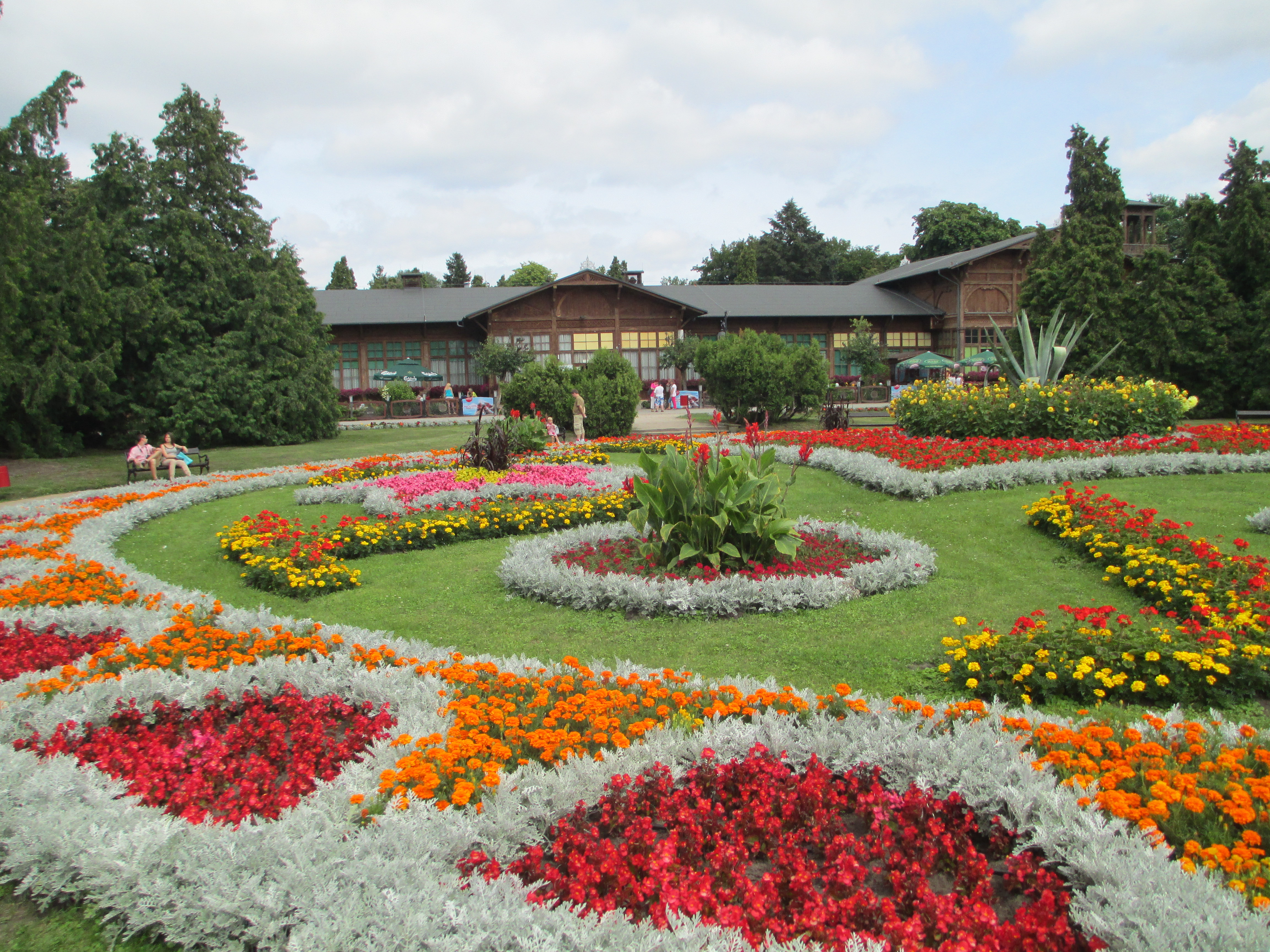
The public garden in Ciechocinek

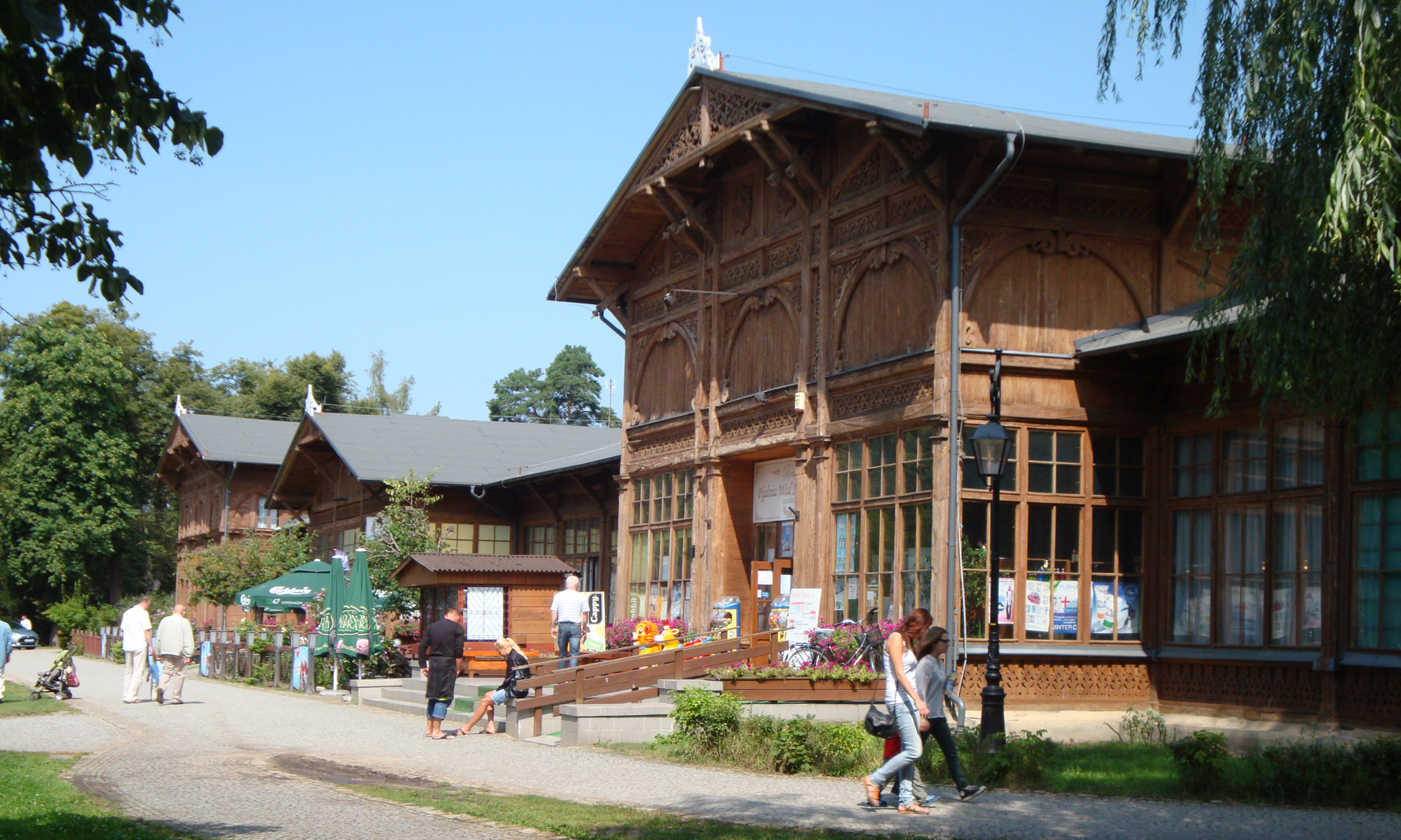
A historic pump room

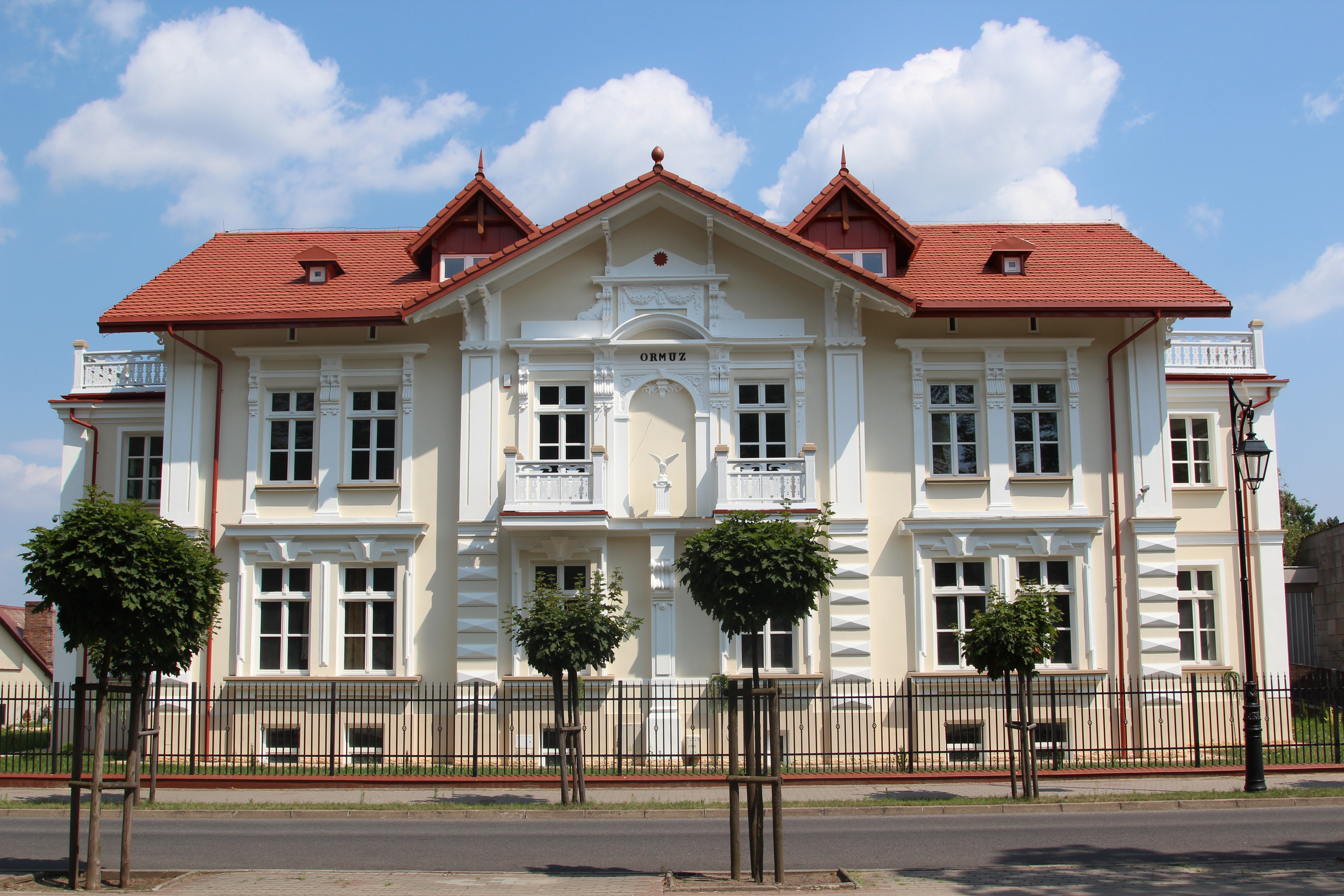
Ormuz Villa built in 1881

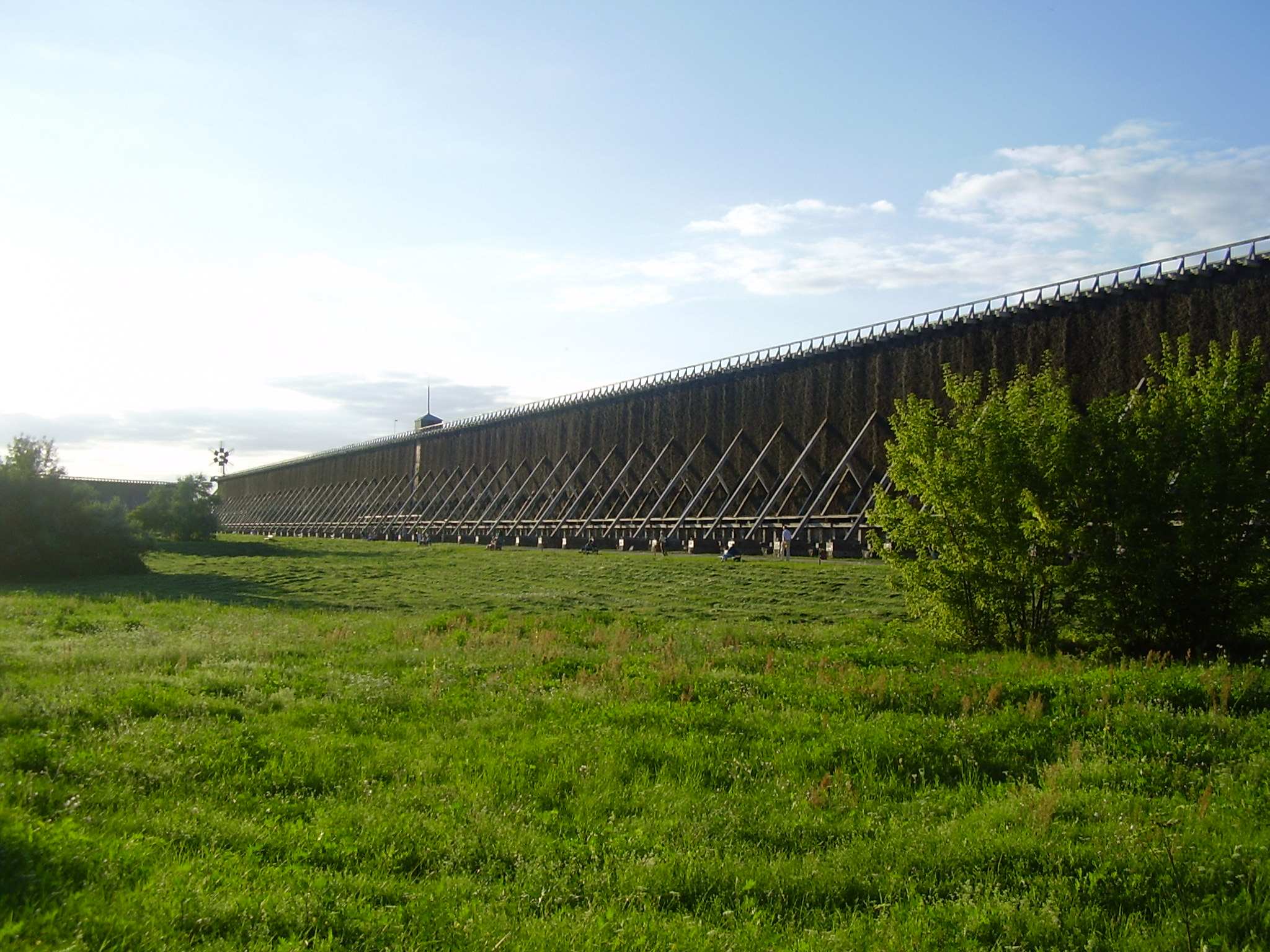
Saline graduation tower in Ciechocinek

== See also ==
- St. Michael the Archangel Church, Ciechocinek
