= Barbara Jeziorkowska =

- The Trilogy character
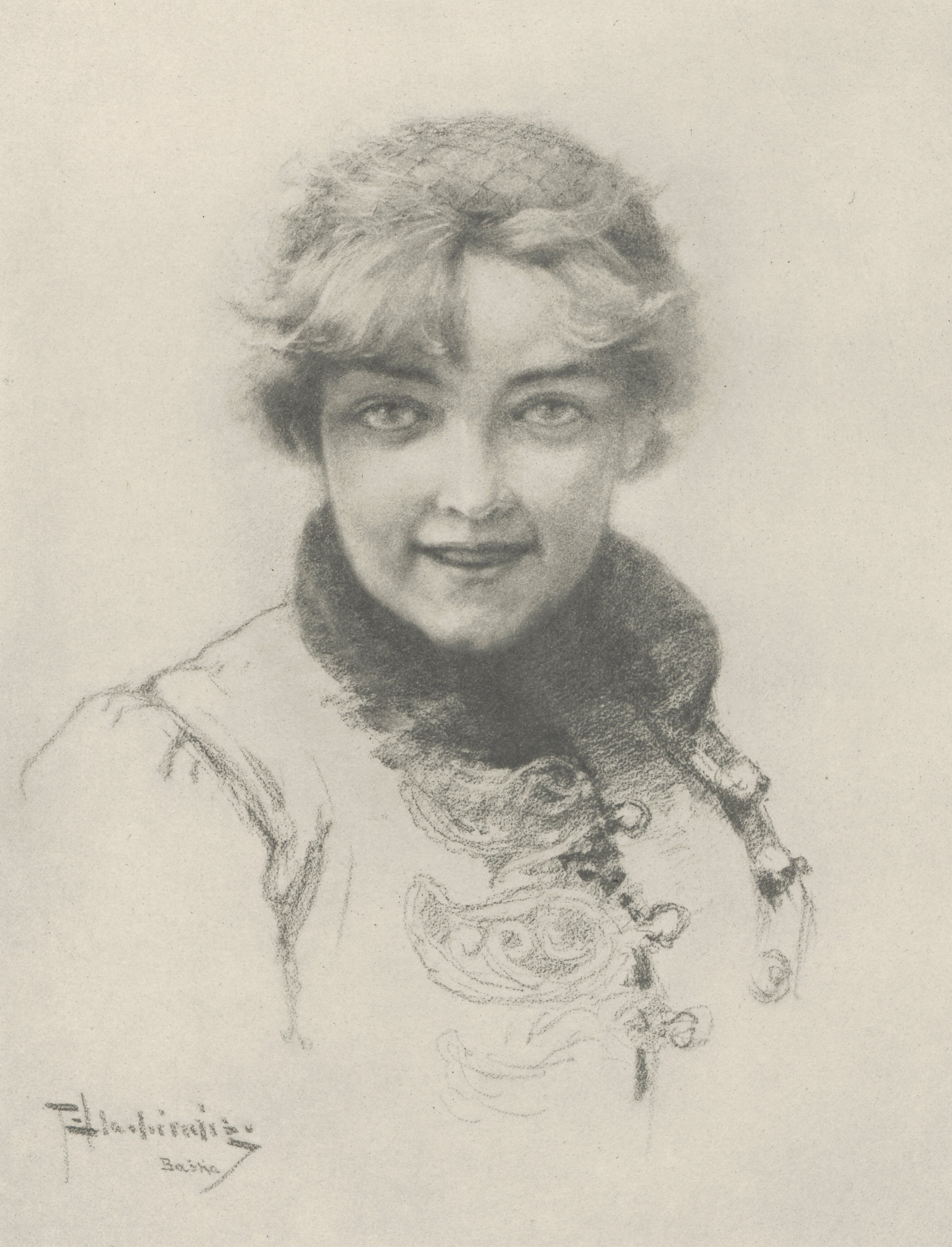
- Portrait of Barabara Wołodyjowska, by Piotr Stachiewicz
- Created by: Henryk Sienkiewicz
- Portrayed by: Magdalena Zawadzka (Fire in the Steppe)

In-universe information
- Nicknames: Basia, Baśka
- Gender: Female
- Spouse: Michał Wołodyjowski
- Religion: Christian
- Nationality: Polish

Barbara (Baśka) Jeziorkowska (later Wołodyjowska) is a fictional character of the novel Fire in the Steppe by Henryk Sienkiewicz. She is the main female protagonist, an orphan who marries Michał Wołodyjowski.

In Jerzy Hoffman's 1969 film adaptation, Barbara is portrayed by Magdalena Zawadzka.

== Story ==
Date of Barbara Jeziorkowska's birth is unknown. At the beginning of the novel she was probably about 18 years old. Barbara was an orphan in the care of stolnik Makowiecki, Michał Wołodyjowski's brother-in-law. In 1668 she arrived (together with Krystyna Drohojowska) to Warsaw and stopped in Ketling's house. She met Michał Wołodyjowski then and fell in love with him. Although Zagłoba tried to arrange their marriage, Wołodyjowski soon proposed to Krystyna. The girl, however, was in love with his friend, Ketling. When Wołodyjowski found out, he let them be together. Barbara then told Wołodyjowski that she loved him and they married.

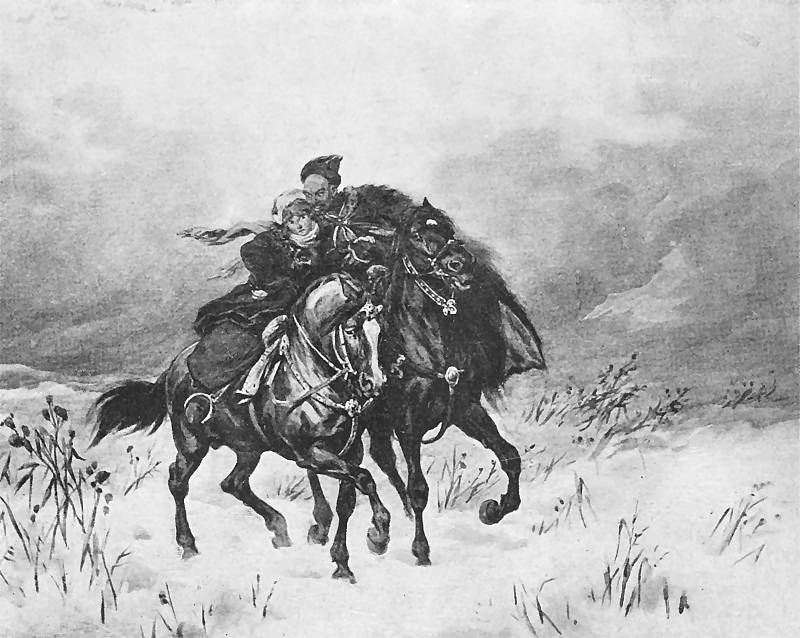
Azja tries to abduct Basia, by Juliusz Kossak

In 1672 Barbara and her husband went to Chreptiów, near Kamianets-Podilskyi. They met there Azja, a Tartar who served Poland as a soldier. The man fell in love with Barbara. She was unaware of it, she thought that he wanted to marry Ewa Nowowiejska. Azja tried to abduct Barbara but he failed. She managed to flee on a horse. She wandered around for a few days and eventually she got to Chreptiów. She was exhausted and sick, but recovered.

Barbara went to Kamianets-Podilskyi along with Wołodyjowski, Krystyna and Ketling. The city was attacked by Turkish army. When the city surrendered, Wołodyjowski and Ketling blew themselves up.

== Description ==
Barbara is a young, petite girl. She's got light short hair and pretty, ruddy face. She is lively, impulsive and confident. She's not afraid to tell Wołodyjowski that she loves him. Baśka is also good-natured, she takes care of Wołodyjowski's soldiers. She is innocent and sometimes even a little childish. She doesn't see that Azja desires her, she believes that he's in love with Ewa Nowowiejska and wants to arrange their marriage. She shows a lot of courage when Azja tries to abduct her - she fights him.

Barbara is a contradiction to Krystyna Drohojowska both in personality and appearance.
