= Tatarophobia =

Prejudice against Tatar people

Tatarophobia (Russian: Татарофобия, romanized: Tatarofobiya) refers to the fear of, the hatred towards, the demonization of, or the prejudice against people who are generally referred to as Tatars, including but not limited to Volga, Siberian, Lipka and Crimean Tatars, although negative attitudes against the latter are by far the most severe, largely as a result of the Soviet media's long-standing practice of only depicting them in a negative way along with its practice of promoting negative stereotypes of them in order to provide a political justification for the deportation and marginalization of them.

== Against the Crimean Tatars ==
=== Soviet era ===
After the deportation of the Crimean Tatars in May 1944, the government strongly promoted existing negative stereotypes of Crimean Tatars and built up upon them; declaring them to be "traitors", "bourgeoisie", "counter-revolutionary", and falsely implied that they were "Mongols" with no historical connection to the Crimean peninsula. Political agitation by party members encouraged other citizens at deportation destinations to abuse them and conferences in Crimea dedicated to promoting and sharing anti-Crimean-Tatar sentiments was held. Traces of Crimean Tatar presence in the peninsula were wiped off the peninsula after the deportation in 1944, with thousands of villages previously bearing Tatar names being given new Russian names, officially detatarizing the peninsula. The deported Crimean Tatars who worked in Central Asia lived under the "special settler" regime, which deprived them of many civil rights that other Soviet citizens enjoyed and confined them within a small perimeter. People involved in the Crimean Tatar civil rights movement repeatedly noted strong similarities between the conditions suffered by designated "special settlers" and victims of apartheid as well as Palestinians under Israeli occupation.

=== In modern times ===
While still very prevalent in modern society, Tatarophobia generates more controversy and pushback in modern times than it did in the past. While no longer officially a state-mandated institution, it remains pervasive throughout government and society; a notable example being when Russian consul Vladimir Andreev demanded that none of the invited Russian citizens attend the debut of Haytarma, a film about Crimean Tatar twice Hero of the Soviet Union Amet-khan Sultan, because it did not depict the Crimean Tatar population in a sufficiently negative light. Andreev admitted that he did not actually see the movie when he told people not to attend, but he said he felt it would be historically inaccurate because a Crimean Tatar directed it.

Confusion about different Tatar peoples has been taken advantage of by propaganda, which will celebrate the relative equality experienced by the Volga Tatar to lead uneducated recipients of propaganda to confuse them with the Crimean Tatars and lead them to believe that interethnic relations are overwhelmingly positive. It is not unusual for Volga Tatars to be praised and lauded as brotherly peoples by the same institutions that simultaneously engage in Tatarophobia against Crimean Tatars, and it is not unusual for the relative lack of hostility towards Volga Tatars to be pointed out as an excuse to avoid correcting xenophobia towards Crimean Tatars. Despite the Crimean Tatar language being very distant from the Kazan Tatar language, the Soviet Union long opposed the request by the Crimean Tatar civil rights movement for their autonomy to be restored in Crimea, and offered to create an autonomous region in Tatarstan for them instead - insulting much of the Crimean Tatar leadership.

== Against the Volga Tatars ==
Historically the Volga Tatars have been lauded as a "model minority" in Russia and the Soviet Union and treated much better than the Crimean Tatars. Nevertheless, prejudices against Volga Tatars exists and there have been some attempts to de-Tatarize Tatarstan by Russian nationalists. In 2007, a young Tatar man was stabbed to death by a group of people on his way to work in St. Petersburg. The Tatar community stated that the murder was racially motivated and a consequence of Islamophobia. After Elmira Abdrazakova, an ethnic Tatar, was crowned Miss Russia in 2013, she was bombarded with racial slurs.

== Against the Lipka Tatars ==
Lipka Tatars have been lauded as a "model minority" in Poland and Lithuania, and received more lenient treatment. However, several historical instances like the Lipka rebellion in 1672, where the Polish–Lithuanian Commonwealth discriminated against Lipka servicemen and caused Aleksander Kryczyński to lead the Lipka Tatars to surrender to the Ottomans, were such examples.

In modern times, anti-Lipka Tatar sentiment came largely via the genocide caused by the occupation of Poland by both Nazi Germany and the Soviet Union, where they suffered ethnic cleansing and religious restriction by both regimes during World War II; these policies continued after 1945 when the Soviets curtailed their practises via puppet regimes like the Lithuanian SSR and People's Republic of Poland, and remained in place until 1989.

In recent years, Lipka Tatars have struggled to preserve their unique heritage in both Poland and Lithuania, as Muslim migrants from other parts, mainly the Arab world and South Asia, began to dominate local Islamic spaces, and often clashed against Lipka Tatars over their practices. Moreover, Islamophobia in Poland and Lithuania also unintentionally targeted Lipka Tatars.

== See also ==
- Anti-Chechen sentiment
- Anti-Mongolianism
- Anti-Turkish sentiment
- Deportation of the Chechens and Ingush
- Deportation of the Crimean Tatars
- Deportation of Koreans in the Soviet Union
- Deportation of the Meskhetian Turks
- Islam in the Soviet Union
- Islam in Russia
- Islam in Lithuania
- Islam in Poland
- Islam in Ukraine
- Islamophobia
- Persecution of Muslims
- Population transfer in the Soviet Union
- Racism against Asians
- Racism in the Soviet Union
- Racism in Russia
