= Aleksander Kryczyński =

Aleksander Kryczyński (died 1673 in Bar) was a Lipka Tatar military captain and a rotmistrz (rotamaster). He first served the Polish–Lithuanian Commonwealth, but then in 1672 led the Lipka Rebellion and defected to the Ottoman Empire.

He was a participant in military action during the Khmelnytsky Uprising and the Polish–Ottoman War from 1672 to 1676. As the bey of the fortress in Bar, he was murdered in 1673 by his own troops during the rebellion. The administration of the castle went to his son.

The history of Kryczyński provided inspiration for the character Azja in the novel Fire in the Steppe by Polish author Henryk Sienkiewicz.
