= Ketling =

Ketling is a surname. Notable people with the surname include:

- Bronisław Prugar-Ketling (1891–1948), Polish general

Fictional

- Hassling-Ketling of Elgin, a character in Henryk Sienkiewicz's novel Fire in the Steppe
- Krystyna (Krzysia) Ketling of Elgin, née Drohojowska, a character of the novel by Henryk Sienkiewicz

== See also ==
- Ketteler
- Kettler (surname)
- Kesseling
