= Stanisław Lanckoroński =

Stanisław Lanckoroński may refer to:

- Stanisław Lanckoroński (voivode) (d. 1535) – voivode of Sandomierz of the Lanckoroński family
- Stanisław Lanckoroński (hetman) (d. 1657) – Crown Field Hetman and voivode of Rus
