= Pan Wołodyjowski (film) =

1969 Polish film

- Pan Wołodyjowski
- Directed by: Jerzy Hoffman
- Written by: Jerzy Hoffman; Jerzy Lutowski
- Based on: Pan Wołodyjowski by Henryk Sienkiewicz
- Starring: Tadeusz Łomnicki; Daniel Olbrychski; Mieczyslaw Pawlikowski; Magdalena Zawadzka
- Cinematography: Jerzy Lipman
- Edited by: Alina Faflik
- Music by: Andrzej Markowski
- Production company: Zespół realizatorów filmowych „Kamera”
- Distributed by: Centrala Wynajmu Filmów
- Release date: March 28, 1969
- Running time: 160 minutes
- Country: Poland
- Language: Polish
- Box office: 12 million admissions

Pan Wołodyjowski, also translated as Colonel Wolodyjowski, is a 1969 Polish historical drama film directed by Jerzy Hoffman. The film is based on the 1887 novel Pan Wołodyjowski by Polish writer and Nobel laureate Henryk Sienkiewicz. The story is set during the Ottoman Empire's invasion of Poland in 1668–1672.

The film was entered in the 6th Moscow International Film Festival, where Tadeusz Łomnicki won the award for Best Actor. The film was also serialized on Polish television, as The Adventures of Pan Michael (Polish: Przygody pana Michała).

== Cast ==
- Tadeusz Łomnicki as Jerzy Michał Wołodyjowski
- Magdalena Zawadzka as Basia
- Mieczysław Pawlikowski as Onufry Zagłoba
- Hanka Bielicka as Makowiecka
- Barbara Brylska as Krzysia Drohojowska
- Irena Karel as Ewa Nowowiejska
- Jan Nowicki as Ketling Hassling of Elgin
- Daniel Olbrychski as Azja Tuhajbejowicz
- Marek Perepeczko as Adam Nowowiejski
- Mariusz Dmochowski as Jan Sobieski
- Władysław Hańcza as Nowowiejski
- Gustaw Lutkiewicz as Luśnia
- Tadeusz Schmidt as Snitko
- Andrzej Szczepkowski as Bishop Lanckoroński
- Leonard Andrzejewski as Halim
- Bogusz Bilewski as Officer
- Wiktor Grotowicz as Potocki
- Tadeusz Kosudarski as Nobleman
- Andrzej Piątkowski as Turk
- Ryszard Ronczewski as Bandit
- Tadeusz Somogi as Envoy
- Witold Skaruch as Monk

== Reception ==
The film had admissions of 12 million.

== See also ==
- Pan Wołodyjowski (Henryk Sienkiewicz's novel on which the film is based)
