= Kettler (surname) =

Kettler is a surname of Germanic origins, particularly in Germany and Austria. Notable people with the surname include:

- Donald Joseph Kettler (born 1944) Catholic Bishop of St Cloud.
- Ferdinand Kettler (1655–1737) Duke of Courland
- Frederick Casimir Kettler (1650–1698) Duke of Courland
- Gotthard Kettler (1517–1587), founder of the Duchy of Courland
- Jacob Kettler (1610–1682) Duke of Courland
- Robert C. Kettler, Washington D.C. area real estate developer (born 1952)
- Wilhelm Kettler (1574–1640) Duke of Courland
- Frederick William, Duke of Courland or Friedrich Kettler (1692–1711)
- House of Kettler Noble House

== See also ==
- Ketteler
