= Daniel Olbrychski =

Polish actor (born 1945)

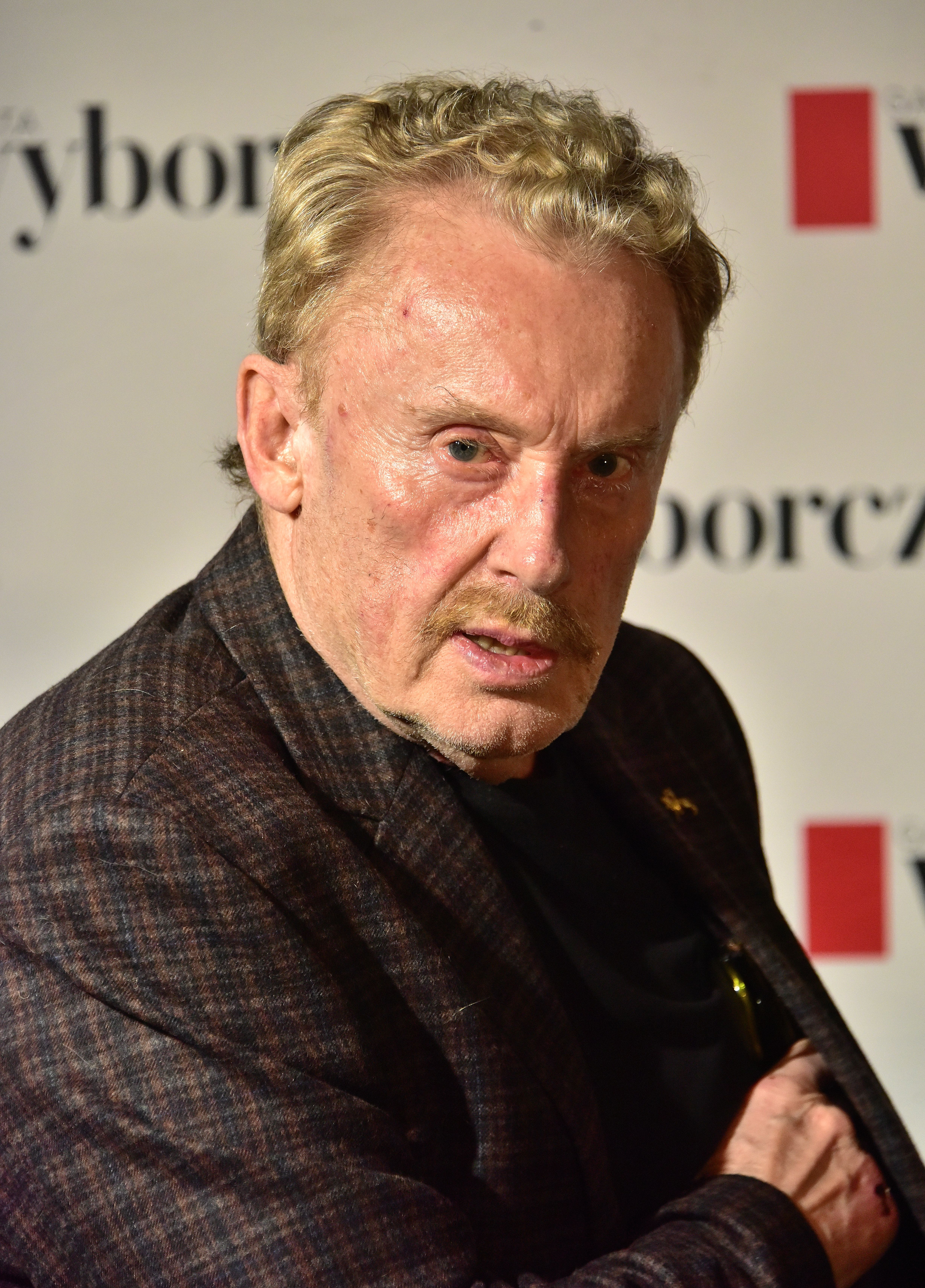
- Olbrychski in 2019
- Born: 27 February 1945 (age 81); Łowicz, Poland
- Occupation: Actor
- Years active: 1964–present
- Spouses: Monika Dzienisiewicz-Olbrychska (m. 1967; div. 1977) Zuzanna Łapicka (m. 1978; div. 1988) Krystyna Demska (m. 2003)
- Children: 3

Signature
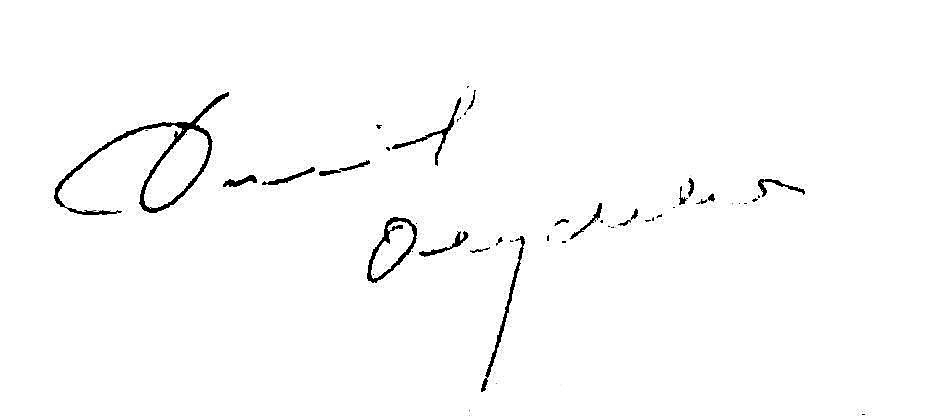

Daniel Marcel Olbrychski (Polish pronunciation: [ˈdaɲɛl ˈmart͡sɛl ɔlˈbrɨxskʲi]; born 27 February 1945) is a Polish film and theatre actor who is widely considered one of the greatest Polish actors of his generation. He appeared in 180 films and TV productions and is best known for leading roles in several Andrzej Wajda movies including The Promised Land, playing Kmicic in Jerzy Hoffman's The Deluge and starring in multiple European and American movies.

== Life and career ==
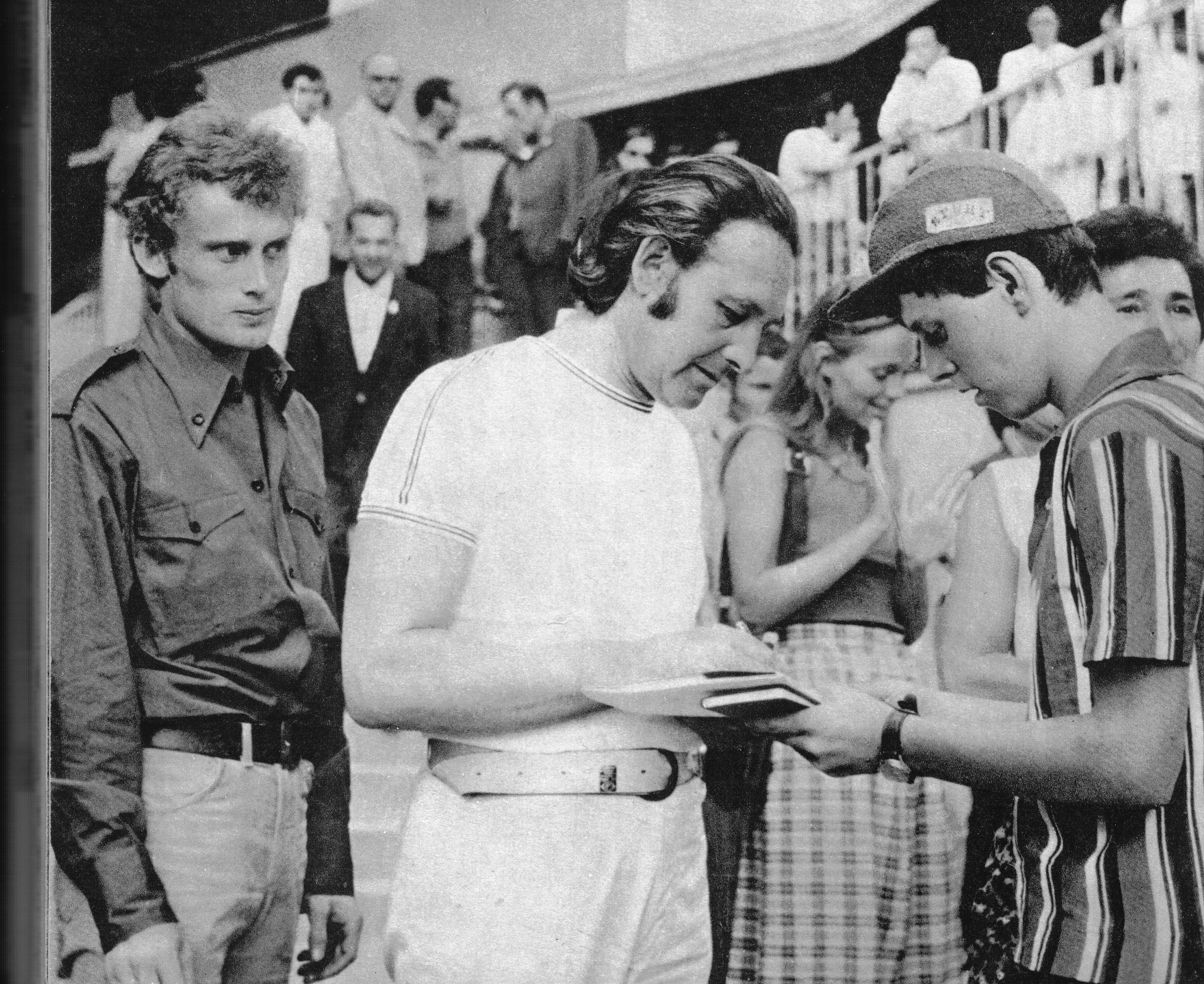
Olbrychski (left) with Andrzej Wajda (centre), 1973

Olbrychski was born in 1945 in Łowicz, Poland to father Franciszek and mother Klementyna (née Sołonowicz). He had an older brother, Krzysztof (1939–2017), who was a physicist. He attended the Stefan Batory Gymnasium and Lyceum in Warsaw. He has been practicing boxing since his youth, he also trained fencing, badminton and judo.

In 1965, he played the character of Rafał Olbromski, his first major film role in Andrzej Wajda's film The Ashes.

In 1971 he won the award for Best Actor at the 7th Moscow International Film Festival for his role in The Birch Wood.

He played one of the leading roles in Volker Schlöndorff's film The Tin Drum based on Günter Grass's novel Die Blechtrommel. He also appeared in one of the ten short films in Krzysztof Kieślowski's Dekalog and played a role in the film adaptation of The Unbearable Lightness of Being.

In 1986, he played one of the main roles in Margarethe von Trotta's film Rosa Luxemburg. The same year, Olbrychski received the French Legion of Honor (L'Ordre national de la Légion d'honneur). In 2007 he received the Stanislavsky Award at the 29th Moscow International Film Festival for the outstanding achievement in the career of acting and devotion to the principles of Stanislavsky's school. In 1998, he starred in Nikita Mikhalkov's film the Barber of Siberia. In a 1998 survey published by Polityka magazine he was ranked 7th on the list of the greatest Polish actors of the 20th century.

In 2010, he received a diploma from the National Academy of Dramatic Art in Warsaw. In addition to acting, Olbrychski has been well known for his abilities as an athlete. A keen horse-rider, a boxer and very able with the sabre, Olbrychski personally performed most of the stunt scenes in his movies.

He was selected to be on the jury for the Cinéfondation and short films sections of the 2015 Cannes Film Festival. Throughout his career, he appeared in five Academy Award-nominated films, two of which won the award (The Tin Drum, 1979 and Dangerous Moves, 1984).

== Personal life ==
In mid-1970s, he was in a relationship with singer Maryla Rodowicz. He has a son Victor from a relationship with German actress Barbara Sukowa. He has been married three times: to actress Monika Dziensiewicz, with whom he has a son Rafał; journalist Zuzanna Łapicka (daughter of Andrzej Łapicki), with whom he has a daughter Weronika, and since 2003 to theatrologist Krystyna Demska. His nephew, Antoni Olbrychski, is a master HEMA fencer and teaches at the Akademia Szermierzy in Warsaw.

He lived for many years in France and speaks French fluently. He practices boxing as a hobby.

During the 2015 Polish presidential election, he endorsed the candidacy of Bronisław Komorowski. He supports the LGBT community.

== Filmography ==
- 1964: Ranny w lesie, as Corporal Koral
- 1965: The Ashes, as Rafał Olbromski
- 1966: Potem nastąpi cisza, as Olewicz
- 1967: Marriage of Convenience, as Andrzej
- 1967: Bokser, as Tolek Szczepaniak
- 1967: Jowita, as Marek Arens
- 1968: The Countess Cosel, as Charles XII
- 1968: Zaliczenie (TV Short), as Student
- 1969: Everything for Sale, as Daniel
- 1969: Colonel Wolodyjowski, as Azja, son of Tugay Bey
- 1969: The Structure of Crystals, as Himself (uncredited)
- 1969: Hunting Flies, as Sculptor
- 1969: Skok
- 1970: Salt of the Black Earth, as Lt. Stefan Sowinski
- 1970: Liberation, Film II: Breakthrough, as Genrik
- 1970: Landscape After the Battle, as Tadeusz
- 1970: Różaniec z granatów (TV Short), as Józef Laptak
- 1970: The Birch Wood, as Boleslaw
- 1970: The Pacifist, as Sergey Abramov (uncredited)
- 1971: Égi bárány, as A hegedülõ
- 1971: Family Life, as Ziemowit Braun, called Wit
- 1971: Osvobozhdenie: Napravlenie glavnogo udara, as Heinrich
- 1971: Osvobozhdenie: Bitva za Berlin, as Henrik Dombrovski
- 1972: Pilate and Others (TV Movie), as Matthew Levi
- 1973: The Wedding, as Bridegroom
- 1974: Roma rivuole Cesare (TV Movie), as Claudio
- 1974: The Deluge, as Andrzej Kmicic
- 1975: The Promised Land, as Karol Borowiecki
- 1977: Dagny, as Stanislaw Przybyszewski
- 1977: Trzy po trzy
- 1977: Zdjecia próbne, as Himself
- 1979: The Maids of Wilko, as Wiktor Ruben
- 1979: The Tin Drum, as Jan Bronski
- 1979: Kung-fu, as Zygmunt
- 1980: Rycerz, as Herophant
- 1980: Wizja lokalna 1901, as Priest Paczkowski
- 1981: Terrarium (TV Movie)
- 1981: Les Uns et les Autres, as Karl Kremer
- 1981: The Fall of Italy, as Davorin
- 1981: From a Far Country, as Captain
- 1982: The Trout, as Saint-Genis
- 1982: Roza
- 1983: La derelitta, as Saül
- 1983: A Love in Germany, as Wiktorczyk
- 1983: Si j'avais mille ans
- 1984: Bis später, ich muss mich erschiessen
- 1984: Dangerous Moves, as Tac-Tac, l'équipe de Liebskind
- 1984: Lieber Karl, as Teacher
- 1985: The Cop and the Girl, as Fritz
- 1985: Casablanca, Casablanca, as Daniel
- 1985: Jestem przeciw, as Grzegorz
- 1985: Flash back, as Vincent Delaune / Thomas
- 1986: Music Hall (TV Movie), as Paul Bronnen
- 1986: Rosa Luxemburg, as Leo Jogiches
- 1986: Ga, ga: Chwała bohaterom, as Hero
- 1986: Siekierezada, as Michal Katny
- 1986: Mit meinen heißen Tränen (TV Mini-Series), as Franz von Schober
- 1986: Mariage blanc (TV Movie), as Félix
- 1987: Farewell Moscow, as Yuli
- 1988: The Secret of the Sahara (TV Mini-Series), as Hared
- 1988: The Unbearable Lightness of Being, as Interior Ministry Official
- 1988: Zoo, as Martina's Father
- 1988: To Kill a Priest (uncredited)
- 1988: La Bottega dell'orefice, as Father Adam
- 1989: Haute tension (TV Series), as Victor
- 1989: Dekalog: Three (TV Mini-Series), as Janusz
- 1989: To teleftaio stoihima, as Orestis
- 1989: L'Orchestre rouge, as Karl Giering
- 1989: Passi d'amore
- 1990: Le Silence d'ailleurs, as François
- 1991: Coup de foudre (TV Series), as Jan Bergman
- 1992: Long Conversation with a Bird (TV Movie), as Angelo
- 1992: Babochki
- 1992: Lazos de sangre, as Alberto
- 1992: Short Breath of Love
- 1993: Kolejność uczuć, as Rafal Nawrot
- 1993: Me Ivan, You Abraham, as Stepan
- 1993: Lepiej być piękną i bogatą, as Lawyer
- 1993: Dinozavris kvertskhi
- 1993: Vervonal
- 1995: Transatlantis, as Neuffer
- 1995: Pestka, as Borys
- 1996: A Torvenytelen, as Korlát Gerzson
- 1996: The Story of Master Twardowski, as Jan Michal Twardowski
- 1996: Hommes, femmes, mode d'emploi
- 1996: Poznań '56, as Professor
- 1996: Truck stop
- 1997: Dzieci i ryby, as Franciszek
- 1997: Szökés, as Nagy fõhadnagy, a recski tábor politikai parancsnoka
- 1997: Balkan Island: The Last Story of the Century, as Limov
- 1997: Opowieści weekendowe: Ostatni krąg (TV Movie), as Witold
- 1998: The Barber of Siberia, as Kopnovskiy
- 1999: With Fire and Sword, as Tugai Bey
- 1999: Pan Tadeusz, as Gerwazy
- 2000: To ja, złodziej, as Seweryn
- 2001: The Spring to Come, as Szymon Gajowiec
- 2001: The Hexer (The Witcher, 2001), as Filavandrel
- 2002: The Hexer (The Witcher, 2002), as Filavandrel
- 2002: Gebürtig, as Konrad Sachs
- 2002: The Revenge, as Dyndalski
- 2003: An Ancient Tale: When the Sun Was a God, as Piastun
- 2003: Nitschewo, as Frank
- 2004: Break Point
- 2005: The Turkish Gambit, as McLaughlin
- 2005: The Fall of the Empire (TV Mini-Series), as Strombah
- 2005: Anthony Zimmer, as Nassaiev
- 2005: Persona Non Grata, as Polish Deputy Minister of Foreign Affairs
- 2006: Off the Stretcher as Witcher
- 2007: Dwie strony medalu (TV Series), as Toni
- 2008: Nietzsche v Rossii, as Friedrich Nietzsche
- 2008: A Man and His Dog, as Taxi polonais
- 2009: Idealny facet dla mojej dziewczyny, as Dr. Gebauer
- 2009: Taras Bulba, as Krasnevsky
- 2009: Mniejsze zlo, as Akowiec
- 2009: Rewizyta, as Wit
- 2009–2010: Czas honoru (TV Series), as 'Doctor'
- 2010: Oda az igazság, as Kinizsi 2.
- 2010: Nie opuszczaj mnie, as Badecki 'Jupiter'
- 2010: Salt, as Oleg Vasilievich Orlov
- 2010: Legenda o Lietajúcom Cypriánovi (uncredited)
- 2010: Odnoklassniki (Russian: Одноклассники), as the Pole on the island Goa
- 2010: Sluby panienskie, as Szlachcic
- 2011: Wintertochter, as Waldecks Opa
- 2011: Tolko ne seychas, as Elka's Uncle
- 2011: Battle of Warsaw 1920, as Józef Piłsudski
- 2012: Z milosci, as Radwanski
- 2012: Hans Kloss: Stawka większa niż śmierć, as Werner
- 2012: The Day of the Siege: September Eleven 1683, as Katski
- 2012: Sep, as Bozek
- 2013: The Hardy Bucks Movie, as Roman
- 2013: Legend No. 17 (Russian: Легенда №17), as NHL manager
- 2014: Piate: Nie odchodz!, as Homeless
- 2014: Passenger from San Francisco, as Professor Steinman
- 2014: Swiadek, as Barak
- 2016: Hidden Reserves, as Wladimir Sokulov
- 2016: Marie Curie: The Courage of Knowledge, as Emile Amagat
- 2016: Titanium White, as Dean
- 2017: Stebuklas, as Priest
- 2017: Off the Stretcher: Resuscitation as Witcher
- 2018: Studniówk@, as Napoleon
- 2018: DJ, as Grandpa
- 2018: Van Goghs, as Victor
- 2018: Kamerdyner, as Leo von Trettow
- 2018: Koja je ovo drzava!, as Predsjednik
- 2018: Souvenir from Odesa (Ukrainian: Сувенір з Одеси), as Mathieu Ozon
- 2019: Mowa ptaków, as Gustaw
- 2019: Polityka, as Deputy Stefan

== Polish dubbing ==
- Cars franchise as Doc Hudson
- Arthur and the Invisibles series as Maltazard
- 2006: Heroes of Might and Magic V as Markal
- 2008: Fly Me to the Moon as Amos
- 2008: Asterix at the Olympic Games as Julius Caesar
- 2008: Assassin’s Creed as al-Mualim
- 2010: ModNation Racers as Chief
- 2011: Red Orchestra 2: Heroes of Stalingrad as Vasily Ivanovich Chuikov
- 2025: Zootopia 2 as Bûcheron and Chèvre

== Modern art ==
- 2013: The dream Off Penderecki as the Polish lector together with Derek Jacobi, Józef Skrzek, Jaroslaw Pijarowski in the music show by Teatr Tworzenia Theater of Creation edited and published exclusively (limited edition) by Brain Active Records in celebration of the 80th birthday of the great contemporary composer – Krzysztof Penderecki

== Awards and distinctions ==
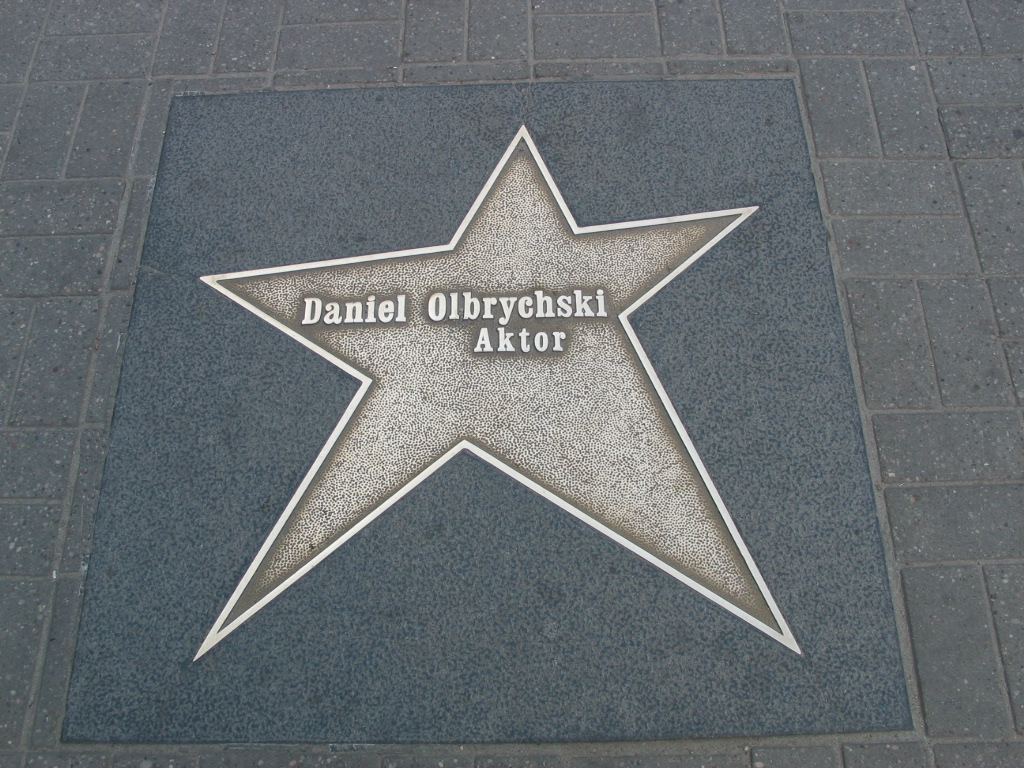
Olbrychski's star on the Walk of Fame in Łódź

- The Zbigniew Cybulski Award, (1969), Poland
- Golden Cross of Merit, (1974), Poland
- Legion of Honour, (1986), France
- Ordre des Arts et des Lettres, (1991), France
- Commander's Cross of the Order of Polonia Restituta, (1998), Poland
- The Actor’s Mission Award at the International Film Festival Art Film in Trenčianske Teplice, (1999), Slovakia
- Order of Merit of the Federal Republic of Germany, (2003), Germany
- Golden Medal for Merit to Culture – Gloria Artis, (2006), Poland
- Medal of Pushkin, (2007), Russia
- Krystian Award for Contribution to World Cinema at the Prague International Film Festival – Febiofest, (2007), Czech Republic
- Stanislavsky Award at the 29th International Moscow Film Festival, (2007), Russia
- Golden Duck Award, (2010), Poland
- Best Actor Award for Outstanding Contribution to Cinematography at the 20th The International Film Festival of the Art of Cinematography Camerimage, (2012), Poland
- Honorary Degree at the University of Opole, (2013), Poland
- Honorary Citizen of the Capital City of Warsaw, (2017), Poland
- Golden Unicorn Award for Best Actor, (2019), Russia

== See also ==
- Cinema of Poland
- List of Polish actors
