= Robert C. Kettler =

American businessman

- Born: 1952 (age 73–74)
- Education: George Washington University, American University
- Occupation: Real estate developer
- Known for: Founder of Kettler
- Spouse: Charlotte Kettler (m. 1990)
- Children: 4

Robert Charles Kettler (born 1952) is an American real estate developer and founder of the Washington D.C. area development company Kettler.

== Biography ==
Coming from a long line of real estate developers, Kettler has been around the real estate business his entire life. Kettler's father and uncle were successful home builders in the 1950s and 1960s, and his grandfather developed apartments in the 1920s. Kettler got his start in real estate remodeling apartments while still a student at George Washington University in 1974. He quickly worked his way up to large projects and co-founded Kettler & Scott, Inc. as the majority owner in 1977. The firm was later renamed "KSI Services," and then as the company's prominence grew, the name became "Kettler."

Kettler's career started to take off in the mid-1980s. His first large-scale project - a 3,000 home community in western Fairfax County - helped Kettler discover his talent for planning large-scale, multi-use properties. Kettler has developed many of the largest planned communities in the Washington D.C. Metro Area, large mixed-use commercial properties and several country clubs/golf courses. Developments include over 25 planned communities and more than 46,000 homes, including the 6,050-home community Cascades in Loudoun County, Virginia; the 2,434-home community Piedmont in Prince William County, Virginia; and the 2,600-home community Lorton Station in Fairfax County, Virginia. The company has developed more than 5 million square feet of mixed-used commercial space, including the 1.2-million-square-foot Trinity Centre mixed-use office park in Fairfax County, Virginia, and the 1.3-million-square-foot Village at Leesburg Town Center in Loudon County, Virginia. The company currently has 4.3 million square feet of commercial space development in the pipeline. Among his most notable projects are Lowes Island Club in Loudoun County and the Piedmont Golf Club in Prince William County.

In addition to planned communities, Kettler has developed some of the region's most successful multifamily communities, including national award-winners The Metropolitan at Pentagon City, The Metropolitan at Reston Town Center, Midtown Reston Town Center and The Millennium at Metropolitan Park. The company has developed more than 15,400 apartments and condominiums within 65 communities. Over the last five years Kettler's condominium communities in North Bethesda, Maryland, and Reston, Arlington and Alexandria, Virginia, were the Washington, DC Metropolitan area's top selling projects with gross sales in excess of $700 million. Additionally, Kettler is the largest developer of affordable housing in the Washington, DC, Metropolitan area. The company has a portfolio of 33 properties with over 6,500 bond-financed apartments that are owned and operated by Kettler.

Kettler has five multifamily projects in development, consisting of nearly 1,700 apartments in Washington, D.C., Columbia Town Center, Maryland, and Pentagon City, Crystal City and Tysons Corner, Virginia. In 2012 Kettler will break ground on two luxury high-rise apartment buildings. The Acadia at Metropolitan Park will mark the final phase of Kettler's Metropolitan Park project in Pentagon City, Virginia, with a 411 unit, high-end apartment building. A mixed-use residential development at 450 K Street in Washington, D.C., will feature 233 apartments.

In 1986, Kettler was named as the National Association of Homebuilders developer of the year. In 2006, he received a lifetime achievement award known of the Monument Award from the Northern Virginia Building Industry Association. He has also received numerous awards from Fairfax County, the Urban Land Institute, and various community and industry associations. The Washington Times has called him "one of the region's most successful businessmen."

In 1988, Kettler established Kettler Management, the property management division of his company. The wholly owned subsidiary manages more than 19,000 apartment units in 85 communities and over 1.7 million square feet of office and retail space. In the last two years the company has expanded into several new markets, including New York City, New Jersey, North Carolina and the Virginia Beach and Richmond areas in Virginia. In 2008, Kettler Management received the National Property Management Company of the Year award. In 2012, Kettler Management will add over 5,000 apartment units to its portfolio. As of February 2012 more than 550 people were employed by Kettler. In 2010 Kettler had an annual revenue of more than $407.5 million.

Kettler has also served on numerous boards of directors included those of the Northern Virginia Building Industry Association, the Northern Virginia Political Action Committee, the Washington Metropolitan Area Boys Club, and Venture America. He has also served on advisory boards at George Mason University and Northern Virginia Community College. In 2006, KSI Services bought the naming rights to the Washington Capitals practice arena, which became Kettler Capitals Iceplex. The facility kept his name until weeks after the Capitals won their first Stanley Cup in 2018, when MedStar Health bought the naming rights in a 10-year agreement together with the other Monumental Sports & Entertainment practice facilities and renamed it the MedStar Capitals Iceplex.

Kettler attended the George Washington University and American University from 1970 to 1974, studying economics and real estate. He has been married to his wife Charlotte for 29 years. Since 2003, Kettler and his wife, Charlotte, have served as co-chairs of a $50 million capital campaign that led to a transformational redevelopment of the Potomac School. They have four children and live in McLean, Virginia.
