= Azja Tuhajbejowicz =

- The Trilogy character
- Created by: Henryk Sienkiewicz
- Portrayed by: Daniel Olbrychski (Fire in the Steppe)

In-universe information
- Alias: Mellechowicz
- Gender: Male
- Family: Tugay Bey (father)
- Religion: Muslim
- Nationality: Tartar

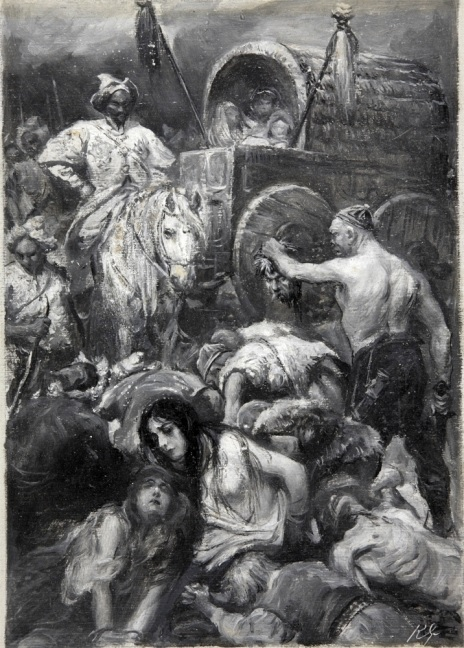
Oil painting of Tuhajbejowicz

Azja Tuhajbejowicz, also known under alias Azja Mellechowicz, is a fictional character in the novel Fire in the Steppe by Henryk Sienkiewicz. He is an antagonist and the rival of Michał Wołodyjowski. He is a Tatar who wants to kidnap Barbara Jeziorkowska, settle some Crimean Tatars on the uninhabited regions of Ukraine to protect Poland's borders (like Zaporozhian Cossacks) and become a "Tatar hetman" in the service of the Polish Crown. While a fictional character, his father was supposedly Tugay Bey, a real historical figure.

In Jerzy Hoffman's 1969 film adaptation, Azja is portrayed by Daniel Olbrychski.

== See also ==
- Lipka Tatars
