= Mieczysław Pawlikowski =

Polish actor

- Born: 9 January 1920; Zhytomyr, Ukrainian SSR, USSR (now Ukraine)
- Died: 23 December 1978 (aged 58); Warsaw, Poland
- Occupation: Actor
- Years active: 1951-1978

Mieczysław Pawlikowski (9 January 1920 – 23 December 1978) was a Polish actor. He appeared in 25 films and television shows between 1951 and 1978.

== Selected filmography ==
- Warsaw Premiere (1951)
- Colonel Wolodyjowski (1969)
