= Michał Wołodyjowski =

Michał Jerzy Wołodyjowski
- Trilogy character
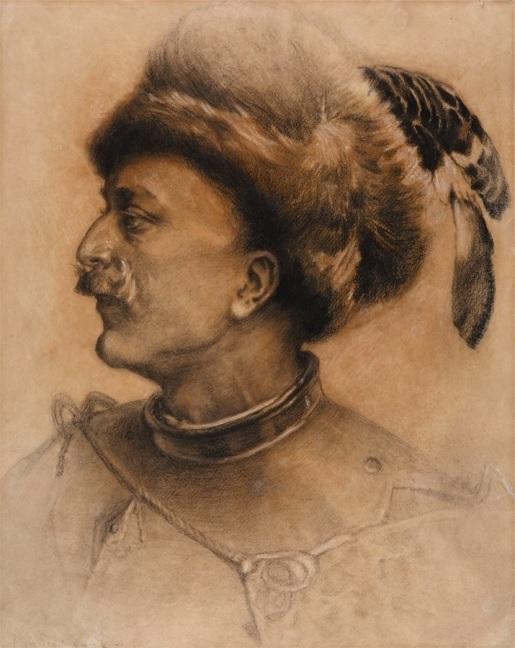
- Michał Wołodyjowski from 'Colonel Wolodyjowski' (in the middle), played by Tadeusz Łomnicki
- First appearance: With Fire and Sword
- Last appearance: Pan Wołodyjowski
- Created by: Henryk Sienkiewicz
- Portrayed by: Tadeusz Łomnicki (The Deluge and Colonel Wolodyjowski; Zbigniew Zamachowski (With Fire and Sword)

In-universe information
- Gender: Male
- Spouse: Barbara Jeziorkowska
- Religion: Christian
- Nationality: Polish

Jerzy Michał Wołodyjowski (Polish: [ˈjɛʐɨ ˈmixaw vɔwɔdɨˈjɔfskʲi]) is a fictional Polish hero in Henryk Sienkiewicz's Trilogy: With Fire and Sword, The Deluge and Pan Wołodyjowski.

Michał Wołodyjowski is partly based on the historic figure, Colonel Jerzy Wołodyjowski, a Polish noble of the Korczak clan.

Korczak coat-of-arms

The trilogy sees Michał Wołodyjowski take part in many battles from a young age, distinguishing him as a feared warrior of great renown. The novels make special mention of his reputation as one of the finest swordsmen alive, a true master of the szabla (a type of Polish saber), as well as a master tactician. His character arc revolves around a war which saw Poland confronted with four super-powers. In one notable battle the Polish army, outnumbered by seven thousand Turkish soldiers, is victorious when the enemy retreats from the field of battle after learning that it is led by Michał Wołodyjowski. The novels take place during the second half of the 17th century and focus around Wołodyjowski, nicknamed the "Little Knight" on account of his small physical stature, journeying with his friends Jan Skrzetuski and Onufry Zagłoba, fighting to save his country from foreign invaders.

Wołodyjowski dies in the Siege of Kamieniec Podolski when together with his friend Ketling he sacrifices himself by detonating a gunpowder depot, rather than witness the surrender of the fortress caused by the surrender of the city.

The novels have also been made into films: With Fire and Sword, The Deluge and Pan Wolodyjowski.
