= Maria Lanckorońska =

Polish noblewoman

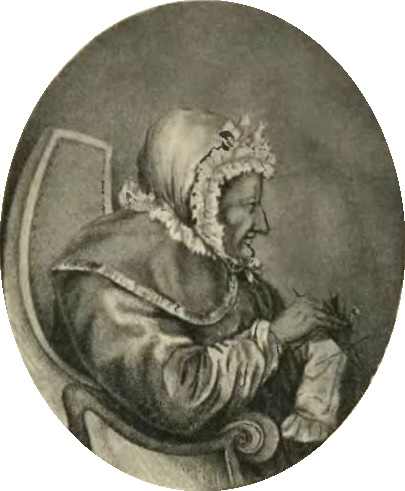
Marianna Lanckorońska

Maria Lanckorońska (1737–1826) was a Polish noblewoman. She is foremost known for her political activity. She was a supporter and participant of the Bar Confederation (1768–1772) and an known opponent of king Stanislaw.
