= Village at Leesburg =

Village At Leesburg
- Location: Leesburg, Virginia, United States
- Coordinates: 39°5′25.17″N 77°31′32.53″W
- Address: 1602 Village Market Blvd SE #215
- Opened: 2011
- Owner: The Carlyle Group and The Rappaport Companies
- Num. of stores: 44
- Num. of anchor tenants: 6
- Floors: 1
- Website: villageatleesburg.com

The Village At Leesburg is a regional outdoor center located in Leesburg, Virginia in the United States. The open-air center features a total of 1.2 million square feet of development encompassing 57 acres.

== History ==
Development on the center began in 2008 by developers Cypress Equities and Kettler, in partnership with global private equity firm The Carlyle Group. Village at Leesburg celebrated its Grand Opening in 2011, making it the first mixed-use center of its kind in Loudoun County. In February 2014, the Loudoun Times-Mirror moved its operations from downtown Leesburg to Village at Leesburg. In October 2014, the Leesburg Town Council unanimously approved a Village at Leesburg's rezoning application, removing the 28,000-square-foot limitation on restaurant uses in the developments Land Bay A.

== Shops ==
The open air development features over 40 retailers and restaurants, including multi-family residences, office and retail space. First-floor tenants include retailers like Wegmans Food Markets, Cobb Theatres, Sweet & Sassy, Travinia Italian Kitchen, and LA Fitness, however, a majority of the tenants are independent retailers.

=== Anchors ===
- Wegmans (140,000 sq ft (13,000 m^{2}))
- Cobb Theatres (68,000 sq ft (6,300 m^{2}))
- Ulta (68,000 sq ft (6,300 m^{2}))
- Orvis (6,022 sq ft (559.5 m^{2}))
- Bowlero (21,564 sq ft (2,003.4 m^{2}))
- LA Fitness (45,000 sq ft (4,200 m^{2}))
