= Lipka rebellion =

1672 mutiny in Poland–Lithuania

- Part of Polish–Ottoman War (1672–76)
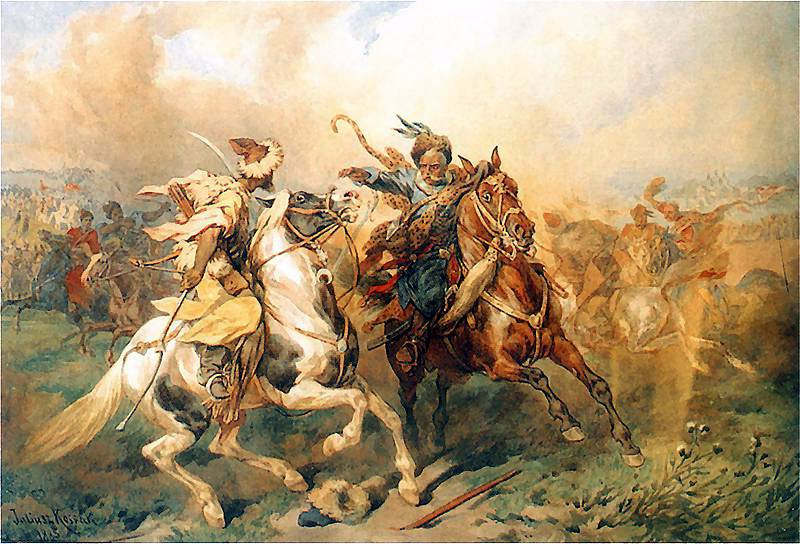
- "The Tatar Dance", painting by Juliusz Kossak
Date	1672
Location	Podolia
Result	Polish–Lithuanian victory: Lipka Tatars rejoin the Commonwealth

Belligerents
Polish–Lithuanian Commonwealth	Lipka Tatars; Ottoman Empire

Commanders and leaders
Jan Sobieski	Aleksander Kryczyński

Strength
100–200	2,000 to 3,000

The Lipka rebellion was a mutiny from 1672 of several cavalry chorągwie (regiments) of Lipka Tatars, who had been serving in the forces of the Polish–Lithuanian Commonwealth since the 14th century. The immediate cause of the rebellion was overdue pay, although increasing restrictions on their established privileges and religious freedom also played a role.

== Background ==
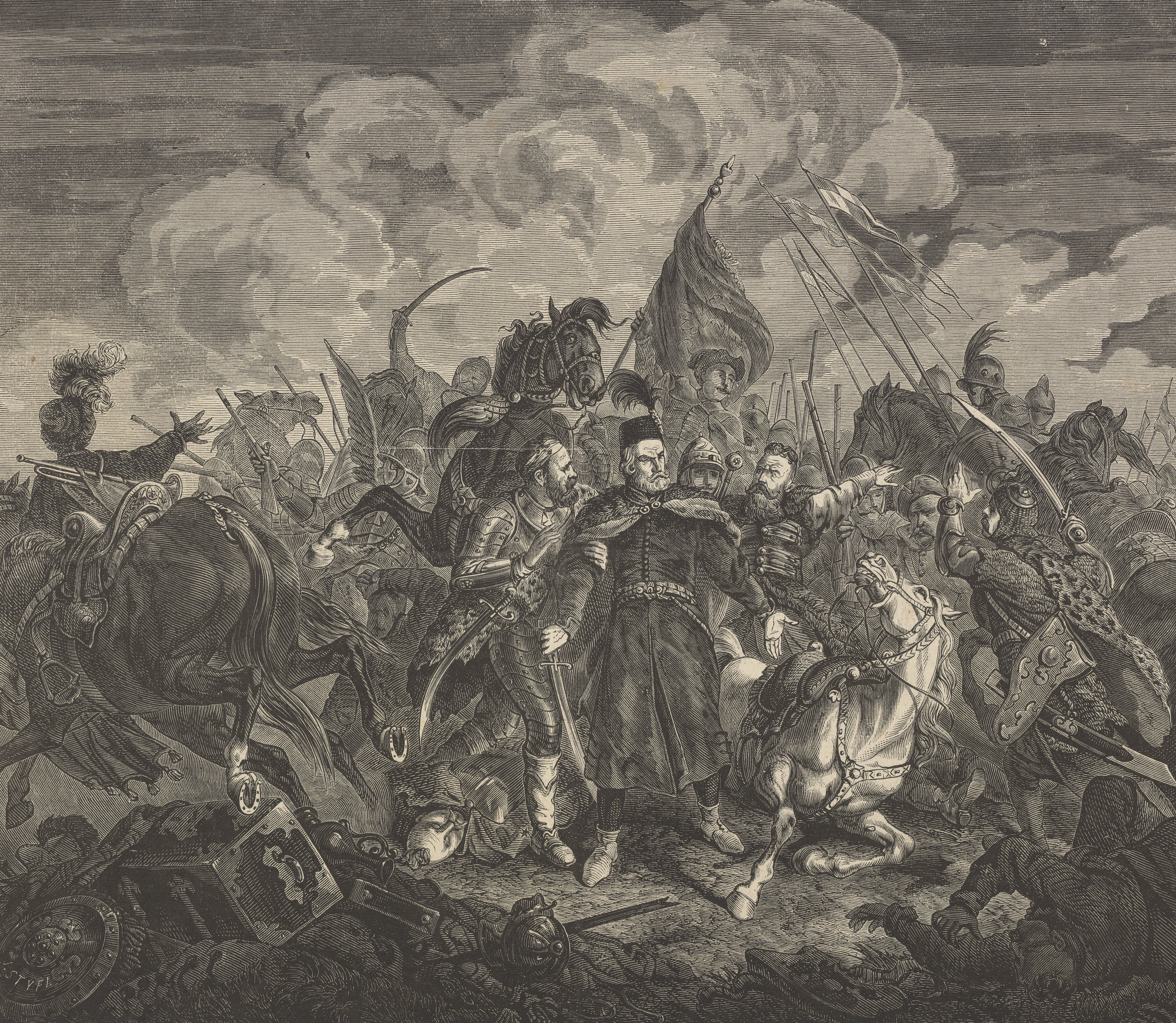
Battle of Cecora (1620) at which the Lipkas fought against the Ottoman Empire on the side of the Polish–Lithuanian Commonwealth

The Lipka Tatars were a group of Tatars who settled in the Grand Duchy of Lithuania in the 14th century, and later in the Polish–Lithuanian Commonwealth. They were given noble status and fought on the Polish–Lithuanian side in the Battle of Grunwald. They formed a military caste within the Commonwealth, while retaining their Muslim religion and Tatar traditions.

Prior to this rebellion the Lipka Tatars had dutifully served the Polish–Lithuanian Commonwealth and were considered to be some of its best and most loyal soldiers. At the beginning of the sixteenth century, emissaries of the Crimean Khanate tried to persuade them to betray the Commonwealth and received the reply:

Neither God nor the Prophet commands you to rob, nor do they command us to be ungrateful. In defeating you, we merely kill common bandits, and not brothers of ours.

Subsequently, the Lipkas fought on the Polish–Lithuanian side against the Ottomans and the Crimean Khanate at Battle of Cecora, the first Battle of Chocim and against the forces of Mehmed Abazy Pasha in the Polish–Ottoman War of 1633.

However, the situation of the Tatars within the Commonwealth worsened in the second half of the 17th century. The Chmielnicki Uprising and the Russian invasion of Lithuania destroyed much of the basis of Tatar livelihood. At the same time, in its wars against various invaders, the Commonwealth employed many foreign, non Lipka Tatar mercenaries, who often, in situations of chaos and lax discipline, pillaged local farms and landholdings. This, combined with the growing effects of the Counter-Reformation and the associated decrease in traditional religious freedom in the Commonwealth, led the Polish szlachta to increasingly view all Tatars, including the Lipkas, with hostility. This culminated in passage of several laws in 1667 which rescinded Tatar privileges and restricted their religious freedoms. In particular, the new laws limited the promotion of Tatars to posts of military command and also forbid the construction of new mosques within the Ruthenian voivodeships (in Ukraine) of the Commonwealth. Finally, the Sejm decided that only the fourth of the wages owed to the Tatar soldiers were to be paid out (this also applied to Wallachian units).

Simmering unrest among the Lipkas led the Polish King Jan Kazimierz in 1668, shortly before his abdication, to rescind the laws. But the insult had been made, and crucially, the wages were never paid out as promised.

== Rebellion ==
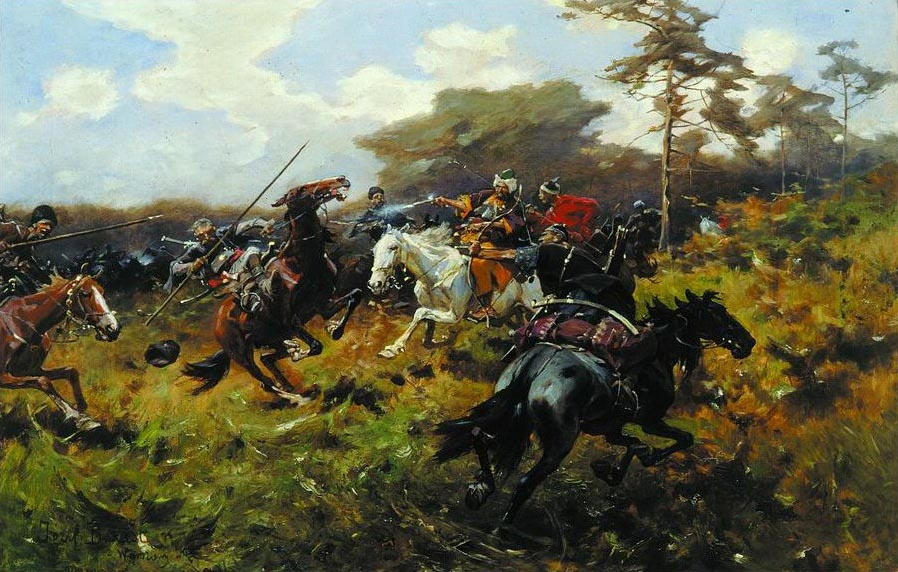
Józef Brandt, "Battle against Tatars", c. 1890

The rebellion involved between 2,000 and 3,000 Tatar soldiers although exact numbers have not been established. Notably, only those Tatar units serving in the army of the Crown rebelled, but not the units which served in the army of the Grand Duchy of Lithuania. Some sources also state that an unknown number of Chermis, who had been deprived of livelihood by the Khmelnytsky Uprising, also joined the rebellion.

As a result of the rebellion, the Lipkas became subjects of the Ottoman Sultan Mehmed IV. Initially, the mutinied units joined forces with Ottoman allied Cossack Hetman Petro Doroshenko and awaited for the anticipated invasion of the Commonwealth by the Sultan's army. During the campaign of the Polish–Ottoman War the rebels served as guides and scouts for the Sultan's main army as they were very familiar with the terrain, and as a result caused great harm to the Polish–Lithuanian war effort. The leader of the mutiny, rotmistrz (rotamaster) Aleksander Kryczyński, was made the Bey of Bar by the Sultan as a reward for his defection.

While the main Ottoman army besieged Kamieniec Podolski, the Tatar units pillaged and burnt the surrounding areas of Podole. On several occasions the Lipkas, dressed in Polish uniforms would ride into Polish villages as allies, then quickly attack and capture the surprised inhabitants. After the fall of Kamieniec, the Sultan settled some of the Lipkas around it and later, after the end of the rebellion, these tended to be the Tatars which did not return to the Commonwealth. The Kamieniec Lipkas still hold on to their separate traditions to this day.

However, soon, most rank and file Tatar soldiers under Kryczyński became dissatisfied with their lot under the Sultan. In the same month that Kamieniec fell, some of Kryczyński's captains sent a secret letter to the Polish Hetman Jan Sobieski which included ten conditions under which the Tatars were willing to come back to the side of the Polish–Lithuanian Commonwealth. At first, this offer was not accepted.

== Rejoining the Commonwealth ==
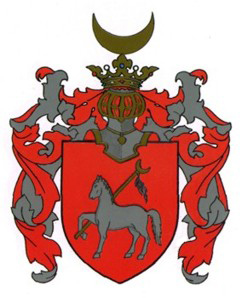
"Araz" Coat of Arms of Tatar nobility. Note the crescent at the top of the staff. Lipka Coat of Arms often included motifs related to Islam

In the end, the mutiny was short lived. The Lithuanian and Polish Tatars were used to holding privileged positions within the Polish–Lithuanian Commonwealth and exercising many personal freedoms. As a result, they found it hard to accept the strict and absolute rule of the Sultan. Furthermore, the area around Bar which, together with their commander, they had been given by the Ottomans, was poor and devastated by war and not of much value to ordinary soldiers. As early as 1673, Tatar privates rioted in Bar and seized and killed Kryczyński. At the same time, Polish and Lithuanian forces began to turn the tide of the war with the Turks and were scoring many successes (for example, at the second Battle of Chocim). In 1674 Hetman Jan Sobieski took Bar, which was defended by the Lipkas. Rather than punishing the mutineers however, he allowed them to return to their former service. During the Polish Swedish war, Sobieski had commanded a 2,000 strong regiment of Tatar cavalry and as a result the Tatars and Sobieski held each other in great esteem. Most of the Lipkas returned into the ranks of the Polish Lithuanian army and fought the remainder of the Polish–Ottoman War on the side of the Commonwealth. The last of the mutinous Lipka units were readmitted into the Commonwealth in 1691.

== Aftermath ==
In 1679, due to the efforts of Sobieski, now King of Poland, the Sejm restored the Tatars' privileges and religious freedoms, while overdue wages were paid in land (some of which came out of Sobieski's private holdings). Most of the bestowed holdings were in eastern Poland and were made in perpetuity in exchange for a guarantee of future military service (which was duly fulfilled in all subsequent wars). Regular soldiers received small farms, while the officers larger land holdings. One local legends tells that the King promised one particularly distinguished rotmistrz, Olejewski, as much land as he could ride around on a horse in one day.

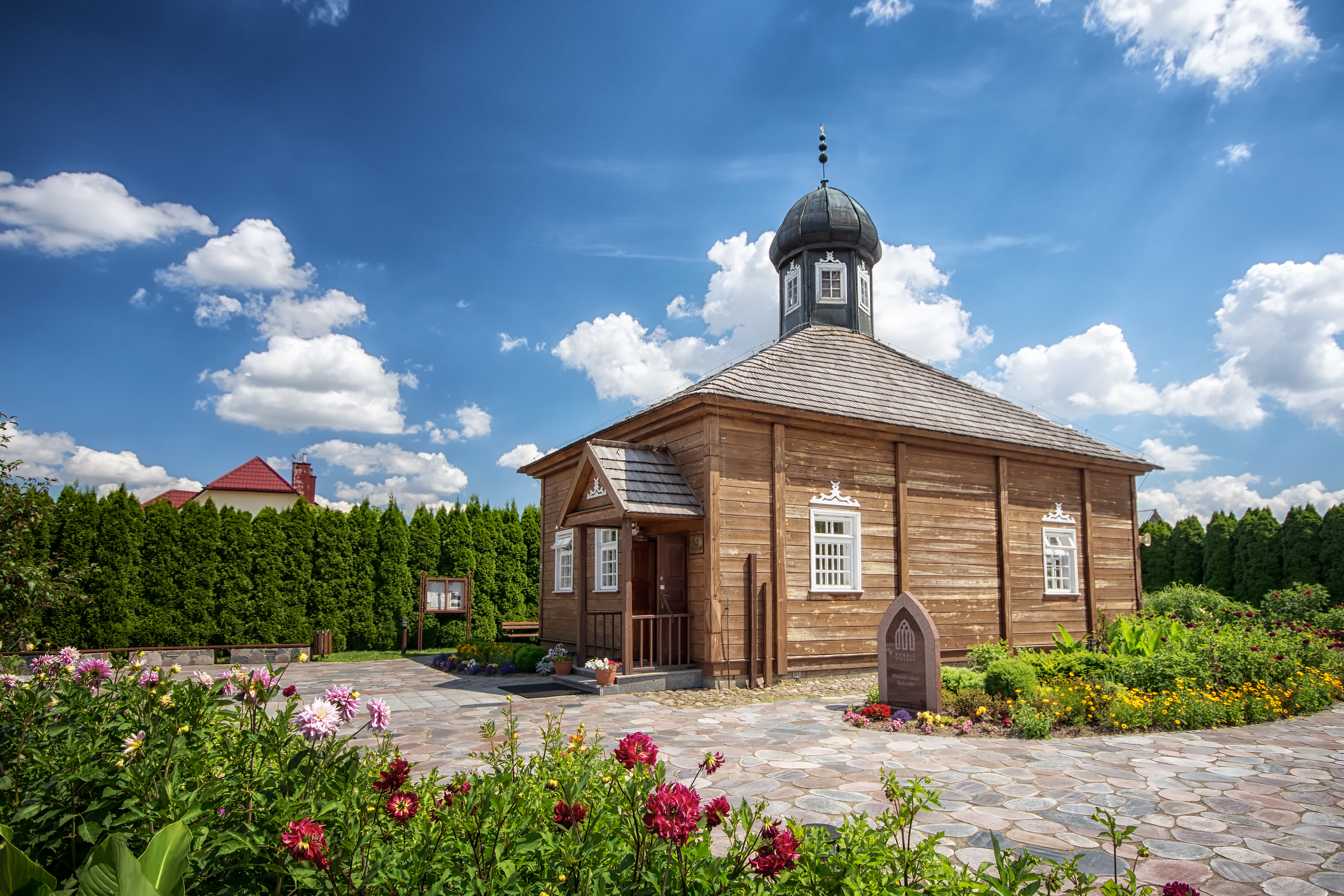
Mosque in Bohoniki, one of the villages given to the Tatars after the rebellion

In the subsequent years the Lipkas remained loyal to the Polish–Lithuanian Commonwealth. They fought with Sobieski in his rescue of Vienna in 1683 (where Tatar Colonel Samuel Mirza Krzeczowski saved the king's life in a follow-up battle at Párkány). The Lipka Tatars who fought at Vienna wore a sprig of straw in their helmets to distinguish themselves from the Tatars fighting under Kara Mustafa on the Turkish side. Lipkas visiting Vienna traditionally wear straw hats to commemorate their ancestors’ participation in the breaking of the Siege of Vienna.

During the period of the partitions of Poland they fought for Polish and Lithuanian independence in several insurrections. They also served in the Polish army after Poland regained its independence, and fought against Nazi Germany in World War II.

== In literature ==
- The rebellion and the associated Polish–Ottoman War form the backstory to the third part of Henryk Sienkiewicz's (who himself was of Lipka Tatar origin) historical trilogy, Fire in the Steppe.

== The Lipka Rebellion in the UK National Archives ==
UK National Archives, Papers of the Secretaries of State: State Papers Foreign. SP 82/12

"Polish thrust towards Kaminiec; large Turkish convoy, going from Walachia in direction of Kaminiec, attacked by Russian woiwode on orders of King of Poland who will next turn upon Barr, a strong town whose garrison includes many Lithuanians and Tartars rebelling against Polish crown." Folio 170, covering Nov.27th to Dec.7th, 1674.

"The Queen of Poland has visited Tarnow; at Barr, chief officers have unconditionally surrendered to King of Poland who sent nearly 12,000 Tartars to Lithuania, Turks to Kaminiec and the governor to the Khan; Mohilow and other towns having capitulated, Polish army going to their winter quarters, except that Kaminiec is to be kept `encompassed'. Folio 180, covering Dec.14th to Dec. 24th, 1674

== See also ==
- Lipka Tatars
- Islam in Poland
- Islam in Lithuania
