= Magdalena Zawadzka =

Polish actress (born 1944)

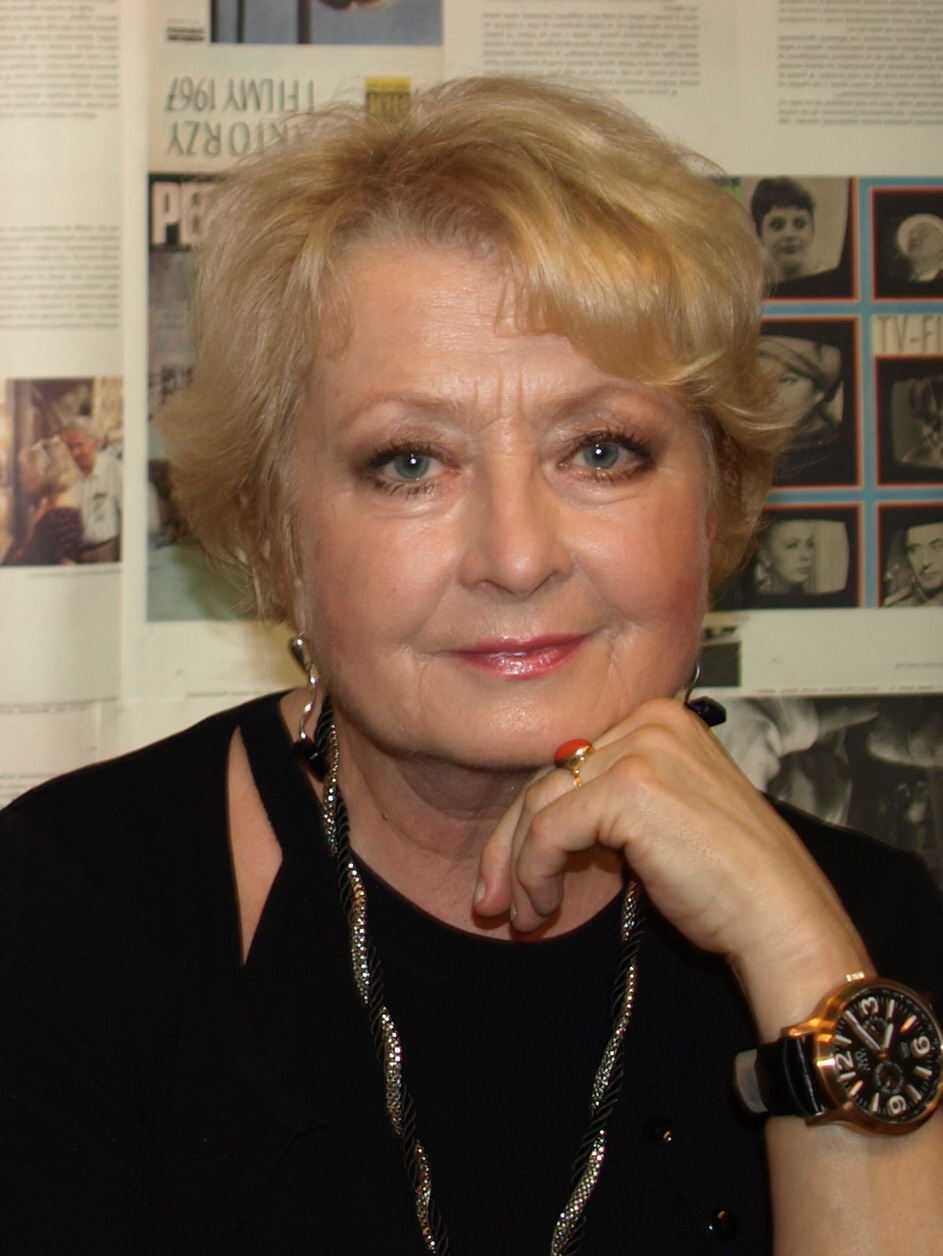
- Magdalena Zawadzka in 2011
- Born: 29 October 1944 (age 81); Filipowice, Poland
- Occupation: Actress
- Years active: 1962–present
- Spouse: Gustaw Holoubek (1973–2008)

Magdalena Zawadzka (born 29 October 1944) is a Polish stage and film actress. She is married to actor Gustaw Holoubek and the mother of cinematographer Jan Holoubek. She gained wide popularity after the 1968 film Colonel Wolodyjowski (Pan Wołodyjowski), in which she played the role of Basia Wołodyjowska.

Her cousin is Australian actress Magda Szubanski.

Notable film roles include Mazepa (1976), Na dobre i na złe TV series (2002), Ryś (2007), and Magda M. TV series (Season 4, 2007).
