= Pan Michael =

1887 novel by Henryk Sienkiewicz

Pan Wołodyjowski
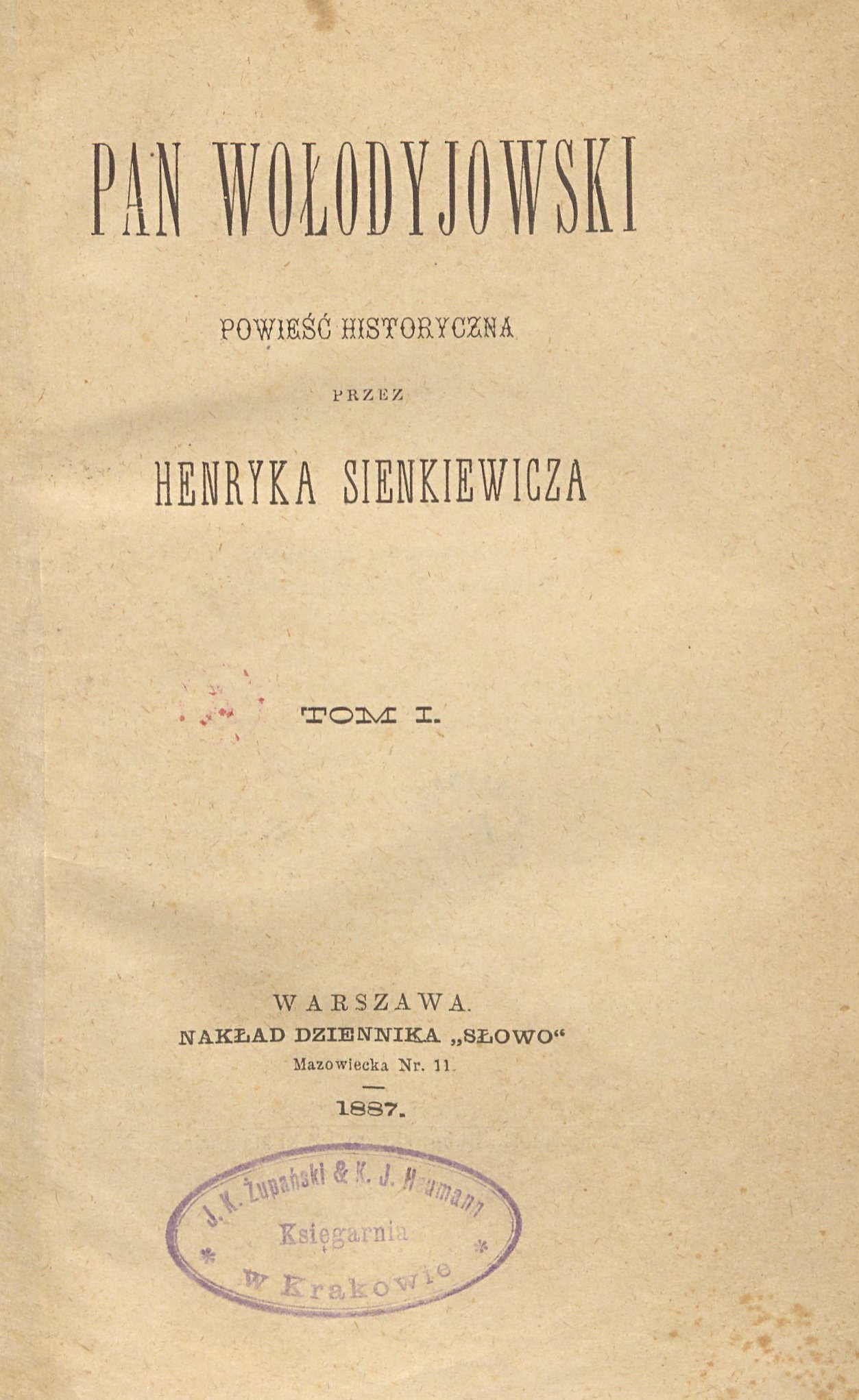
- Author: Henryk Sienkiewicz
- Original title: Pan Wołodyjowski
- Language: Polish
- Series: The Trilogy
- Genre: Historical novel
- Publication date: 1887
- Publication place: Poland
- Preceded by: The Deluge
- Followed by: On the Field of Glory

Pan Wołodyjowski (titled in English as Pan Michael, 1893, and Fire in the Steppe, 1992; other titles used in English discourse include Colonel Wołodyjowski, Sir Michael and Sir Wołodyjowski) is a historical novel by the Polish author Henryk Sienkiewicz, published in 1887. It is the third volume in a series known to Poles as "The Trilogy", being preceded by With Fire and Sword (Ogniem i mieczem, 1884) and The Deluge (Potop, 1886). The novel's protagonist is Michał Wołodyjowski.

== Plot summary ==
=== Chapters 1–5 ===
Michael Wołodyjowski has retired to a monastery after the death of his betrothed, Anna Borzobogati. At Częstochowa. Kharlamp, an acquaintance, goes to see Andrzej Kmicic to get his help in persuading him to leave it. He and Zagłoba make a journey to consult Yan, and it is finally Zagłoba who offers to speak to Wołodyjowski.

Making his way to Warsaw, Zagłoba meets his old friend, Hassling-Ketling, a Scot, who now resides in Warsaw after being adopted by a noble in Svyenta in Courland, who offers him a bed. Taking place is the Diet to elect a new King of which Prince Bogusław is a candidate and Zagłoba is determined to raise support against the traitor.

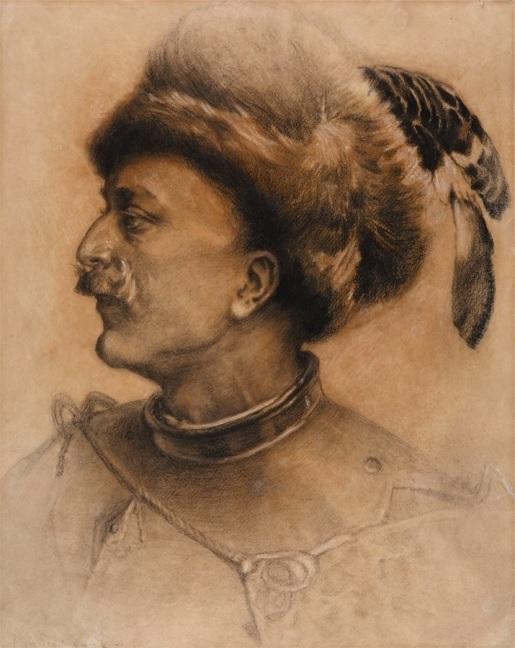
Michael Wołodyjowski by Piotr Stachiewicz

=== Chapters 6–16 ===
Zagłoba carries a letter from the primate to the monastery of Mons Regius. Michael is now known as Brother Yerzy and is persuaded to leave for the nation's sake and stays at Ketling's house. They are visited by Sobieski, the hetman, and a feast takes place and Michael receives a present of a cream-coloured steed.

Michael's sister, Mrs Makovetski, visits Warsaw and is invited to stay with Krystina Drohoyovski and Barbara Yezorkovski, of whom her husband is their guardian. Michael is immediately attracted by Krysia but Zagłoba intends that Basia, who delights him, should be the little knight's. He teaches her fencing and she is disconcerted and embarrassed by his adeptness with the sword for whom she develops a strong admiration. Adam Novoveski, a young cavalier, arrives on the scene and pays court to Basia but she has nothing of it and rejects his eventual marriage proposal.

Michael meets with Sobieski and is sent with letters to Rushchyts in Russia and the Wilderness beyond. He says farewell to Krysia and an unspoken pact is made between them. Michal leaves and Ketling of Elgin returns to his house from Courland and Krysia is immediately enchanted by his looks and manners. Zagłoba implements his stratagem to set Ketling at Krysia in order to save ‘his little haiduk’ Basia for Michael. Owing to her pact, Krysia resolves to enter a convent and Ketling vows to return to Scotland.

=== Chapters 17–22 ===
The Diet continues and on their way back from Warsaw one evening, Zagłoba and Basia encounter Wołodyjowski and his brother-in-law Makovetski. Over time Michael realizes that Krysia no longer loves him and agrees to give her up. However, on learning from Basia that it is Ketling for whom she feels affection, he falls into a rage and rushes off to kill him. Later, Ketling and Michael return having resolved their differences as old friends and Michael, encountering Basia once more, and she reveals her love for the worthy cavalier.

=== Chapters 23–28 ===
Summer of 1671 finds Michael in Sokol, Basia's paternal villages, happily married and running the estate as efficiently as he does his troops. He is commanded forward to build a stanitsa at Hreptyoff and Basia arrives with Zagłoba to a rousing welcome from the troops. In the evenings the officers discuss their experiences of the Turks and their periods of imprisonment. The time is spent crushing the independent detachments of robbers on both banks of the Dniester ravishing the Polish and Moldavian sides. A Cossack band, under Azba Bey, is wiped out and Basia, who observes the conflict, is chased by some fleeing Cossacks and is helped by the young Lithuanian Tartar, Mellehovich, who falls under her spell.

Mrs Boski arrives at Hreptyoff with her daughter, Zosia, journeying to the Khan to pay her husband's ransom and Michael offers to send letters to Pyotrovich to give to Rushchyts at Rashkoff. Mr Novoveski and his daughter, Eva, are also with the party going to Rashkoff to be reunited with Adam, who ran away from the family home to join the army. Eva immediately recognises Mellehovich and then Novoveski, who calls him Azya, and who raised him alongside his son. However, as the young Tartar is now an officer of the hetman and serving under Michael, his commandant, he is out of the old nobleman's clutches and an old officer, Nyenashinyets, now recognises him as Tugai Beyovich, Tugai Bey's son and so a prince.

=== Chapters 29–35 ===
Azya reveals his plan—a treacherous one—to Bogush to supposedly bring the Lithuanian Tatars over to the hetman's cause to fight against the Turk but in fact to use these troops to attack the unsuspecting Poles. Basia resolves to reunite Eva and Azya and, speaking to the handsome Tartar, leaves him with the impression that it is she herself who is in love with him. Halim, an old Tartar, brings news to Azya who reveals his plan to kidnap Basia.

Bogush travels swiftly from Hreptyoff to his hetman, Sobieski, to inform him of Azya's plan but it is rejected outright. It is now Christmas and old Novoveski is at last reunited with a repentant Adam and the latter is also enchanted by the blue-eyed Zosia Boski.

=== Chapters 36–50 ===
Adam leaves for Rashkoff after his betrothal to Zosia. Michael agrees to allow Basia to accompany Eva to Rashkoff under the protection of Azya and his Lithuanian Tartars. On the journey Azya commands Halim to occupy Roshkoff and attempts to seize Basia who strikes him in the face with the ivory butt of her pistol. Fleeing back to Hreptyoff as the Lithuanian Tartars slaughter the unsuspecting inhabitants of Roshkoff by the bands of Krychinski and Adurovich. Azya slits Novoveski's throat, keeps Zosia Boski for himself and grants Eva to Adurovich. Zosia, her mother and Eva all are sold off to harems in Turkey and are never seen or heard of again.

=== Chapters 51–55 ===
After a terrible journey through the wilderness, and losing her horses to wolves and an icy river, Basia makes it back to the fortalice. She collapses exhausted in a fever and Zagłoba sends for a doctor from Kamenyets who revives her from near death.

Gorzenski, the commandant at Mohiloff, intercepts Azya's orders to his Tartars and kills the Mazovian infantry as well as sending a message to Yampol, thus saving it from destruction. The Ketlings arrive at Hreptyoff—Sobieski has appointed him commander of the artillery at Kamenyets—and Basia resolves to remain with Michael at Kamenyets as well.

The Sultan is slowly gathering his army and Michael writes to the hetman to grant a pardon to all robbers if they join the infantry. Sobieski commands him to defend Kamenyets to the last.

=== Chapters 56–62 ===
The Turks finally march from Adrianople and Adam, now a much broken man, joins his friends at Hreptyoff, and then leads an advance guard against the enemy's chambuls, crossing the Danube and advancing as far as Pruth. Adam's dragoons assault Azya's chambul and, capturing him, give him an agonising death by drawing him on a sharpened stake.

Basia and Zagłoba join Michalel at Kamenyets which is seething with preparations for its defence against the Turkish invasion. A Council of War is held, joined by Bishop Lantskoronski, Mikolai Pototski, starosta of Podolia, Lantskoronski, chamberlain of Podolia, Revuski, secretary of Podolia and officers and Michael gives them the courage required to defend the town.

Vasilkovski's cavalry dragoons slaughter the leading janissaries at Jvanyets, the remnants fleeing back across the Dniester river.

=== Chapters 63–67 ===
Individual skirmishes now take place outside Kamenyets and Michael, riding on his Wallachian bay, kills Hamdi, a renowned pagan warrior. The Vizir, Sultan and Khan all arrive on the field of battle and Michael is infuriated by a letter sent via an envoy, Yuritsa, on behalf of the town council seeking an armistice. A meeting takes place outside the castle's walls and the dog-brothers’ arrogant demands are roundly rejected.

The main threat to the castle is from tunnels and mines. The town is also set on fire by Turkish cannon. Michael and Mushalski resolve to attack the Turkish tunnel being dug through the rock and the mission is successful, except for the loss of Mushalski, the brave bowman, but he returns the next day dressed as a janissary.

White flags are spotted from the old castle's battlements the next day and the town surrenders—a message is received that the troops must withdraw from the castle before evening and raise the white flag. The envoys—three commissioners—finally come and state that one of the conditions is for Kamenyets to go to the Sultan forever, who would turn it into the capital of his new province in Central Europe. As the Polish troops leave the castle, a mine explodes and kills Colonel Michael Wołodyjowski, the Hector of Kamenyets and first soldier of the Commonwealth. In the monastery of St. Stanislav, his body is interred in a lofty catafalque, with his lead and wooden coffins lying on top. Father Kaminski conducts the funeral service and Sobieski makes a grand entrance and kneels at the catafalque to pray for his soul.

=== Epilogue ===
Sobieski makes camp at Hotin, with grand hetman, Pats, and field hetman Michael Kazimir Radzivill, who take up position on the heights connecting Hotin with Jvanyets. A huge battle takes place after a bitterly freezing night of rain, storm and darkness. The two sides are evenly matched until the weight of the battle is transferred to the centre. The grand hetman, assisted by the voevode of Rus, sends in his hussars and the Tartar janissaries—led by Hussein, the white-bearded Kiaya, "Lion of God"—are finally vanquished on the Polish lances, many of them dying in a rugged ravine at the opposite side of their camp. Two old valiant knights—Motovidlo and the bowman Mushalski—are killed, along with Adam Novoveski who dies with a smile on his lips and calm serenity on his face. Cries of “Vivat Johannes victor!” ring out in the captured pagan camp of Hussein Pasha as a Thanksgiving Mass is celebrated by Sobieski and his victorious army.

== Major characters ==
=== Historical figures ===
- John III Sobieski
- Michał Korybut Wiśniowiecki
- Petro Doroshenko
- Mikołaj Potocki
- Kara Mustafa Pasha

=== Fictional characters ===
- Michał Wołodyjowski
- Ketling
- Onufry Zagłoba
- Adam Nowowiejski
- Azja
- Barbara Jeziorkowska
- Krystyna Drohojowska
- Ewa Nowowiejska

== Film ==
Pan Michael was adapted to the screen by Polish director Jerzy Hoffman in 1968, as Colonel Wolodyjowski. The film was also serialised on Polish television under the title The Adventures of Sir Michael (Polish: Przygody pana Michała).

The film is the third part of Sienkiewicz Trilogy of Hoffman (DVD edition), 2004.

== English translation ==
The novel was first translated to English by Jeremiah Curtin as Pan Michael in 1893. It was translated again in 1992 by W. S. Kuniczak as Fire in the Steppe.

- Henryk Sienkiewicz, Pan Michael, translation from the Polish by Jeremiah Curtin, Little, Brown and Company, Boston, 1895 (copyright 1893). Digital book at HathiTrust Digital Library
- Henryk Sienkiewicz, Fire in the Steppe, authorized and unabridged translation from the Polish by Jeremiah Curtin, Little, Brown and Company, Boston, 1917 (copyright 1893, 1898).
- Henryk Sienkiewicz, Fire in the Steppe, Hippocrene Books, 1992, ISBN 0-7818-0025-0.
- Jerzy R. Krzyżanowski, The Trilogy Companion: A Reader's Guide to the Trilogy of Henryk Sienkiewicz, Hippocrene Books, 1992, ISBN 0-87052-221-3.

== See also ==
- Lipka rebellion
