= Lanckoroński =

Polish aristocratic family

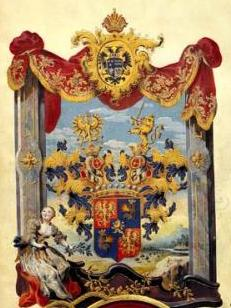
Coat of Arms of the Lanckoroński family, confirmed on 18 November 1783 by Joseph II, Holy Roman Emperor

Coat of Arms of Counts Lanckoroński

The House of Lanckoroński (plural: Lanckorońscy) was an old and wealthy Polish aristocratic family. Its representatives held power and influence in the Kingdom of Poland from the times of the late Piast dynasty (14th century) to the end of the Polish–Lithuanian Commonwealth (18th century).

== History ==
The Lanckoroński name derives from the village of Lanckorona in Lesser Poland, a site of a castle. The family had previously hailed from Brzezie (today part of the town of Wodzisław). The Lanckorońskis were based in Kraków and Sandomierz and used the Zadora coat of arms.

Emperor Joseph II’s confirmed the validity of the title of Count granted to the Lanckoroński family (18 November 1783). In the late 19th century, Count Karol Lanckoroński built the Palais Lanckoroński in Vienna.

== Notable representatives ==
- Mikołaj z Brzezia (Mikołaj of Brzezie), 14th century Grand Crown Marshal
- Zbigniew z Brzezia (Zbigniew of Brzezie), 15th century Grand Crown Marshal, (c. 1360–c. 1425)
- Przecław Lanckoroński, knight, rumored to be the first Cossack hetman, (?-1531)
- Stanisław Lanckoroński, voivode of Sandomierz, (?-1535)
- Samuel Lanckoroński, castellan of Wiślica and Nowy Sącz, starosta of Małogoszcz (?-1638),
- Stanisław Lanckoroński, Field Crown Hetman (c. 1597–1657),
- Wespazjan Lanckoroński, bishop of Kamieniec
- Maciej Lanckoroński, castellan of Kiev, voivode of Bracław (1723–1789),
- Maria Lanckorońska ze Świdzińskich, castellan of Połaniec (1737–1826),
- Eleonora Fihauser née Lanckorońska patron of Church in Gdów and Polish independence movement (1777–1850),
- Karol Lanckoroński, count, (1848–1933)
- Karolina Lanckorońska, countess, founder of the Lanckoroński Foundation, (1898–2002)

== Gallery ==
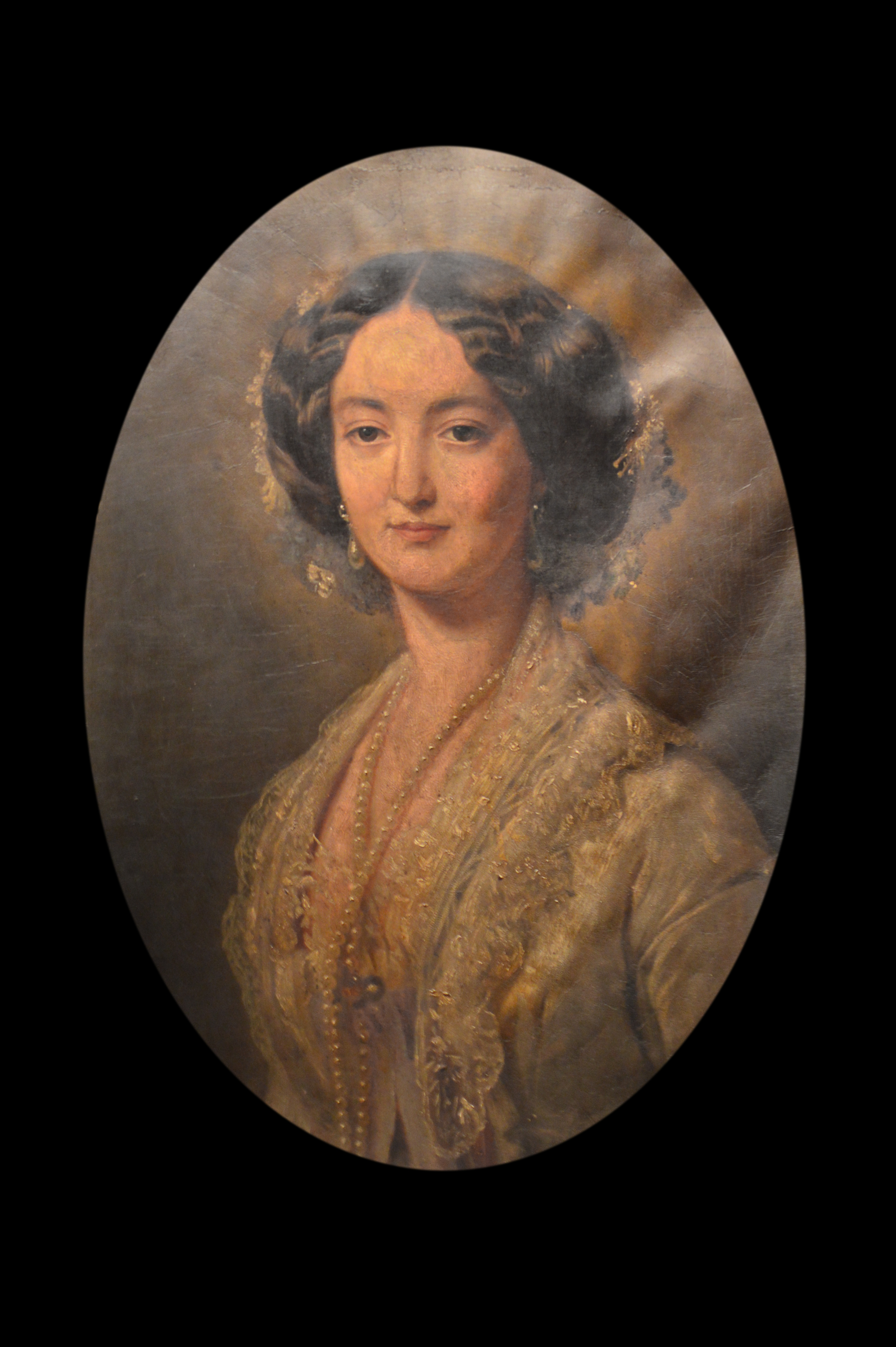
Portrait reputedly of Eleonora Fihauser née Countess Lanckorońska

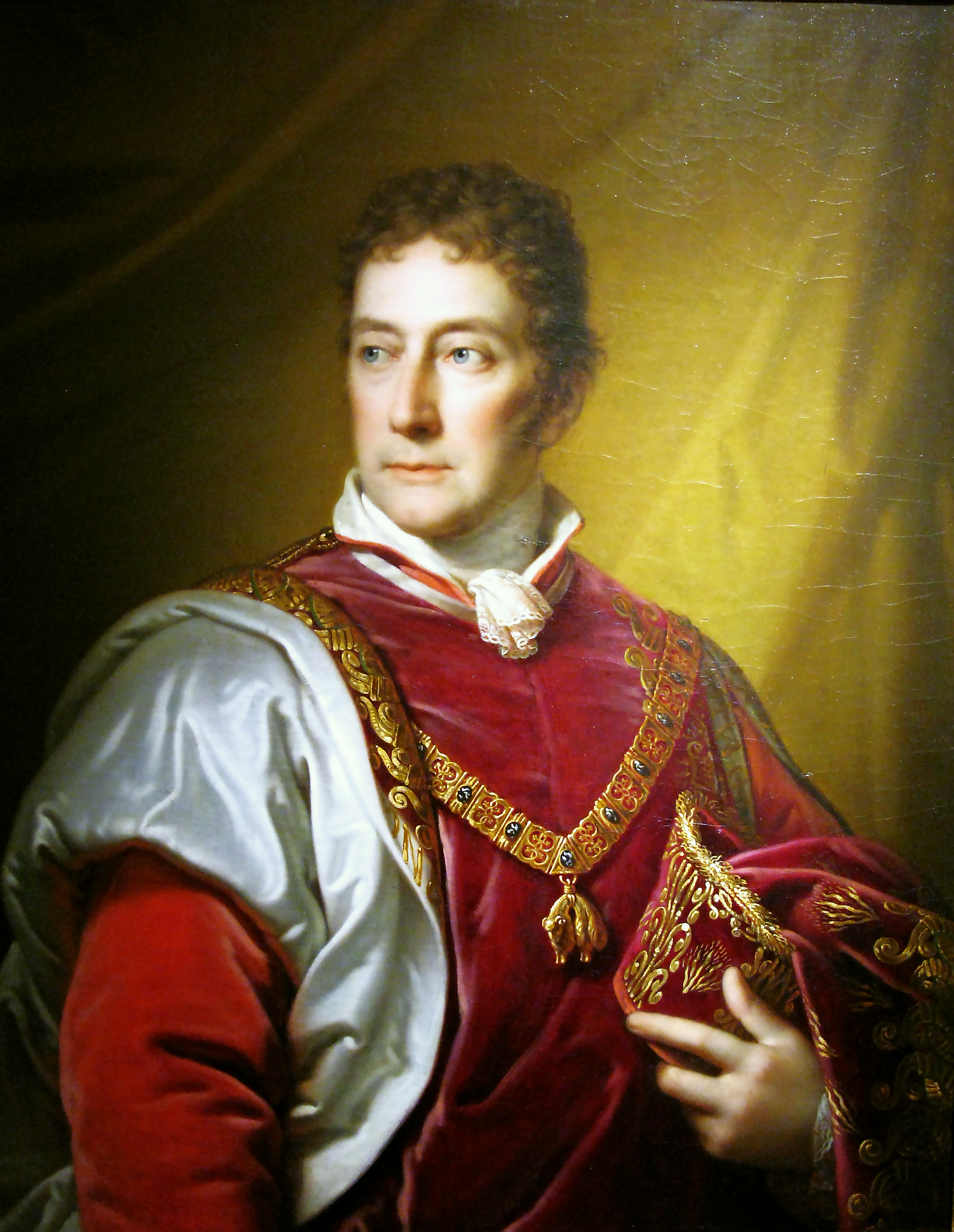
Count Anton Lanckoroński (1760–1830)

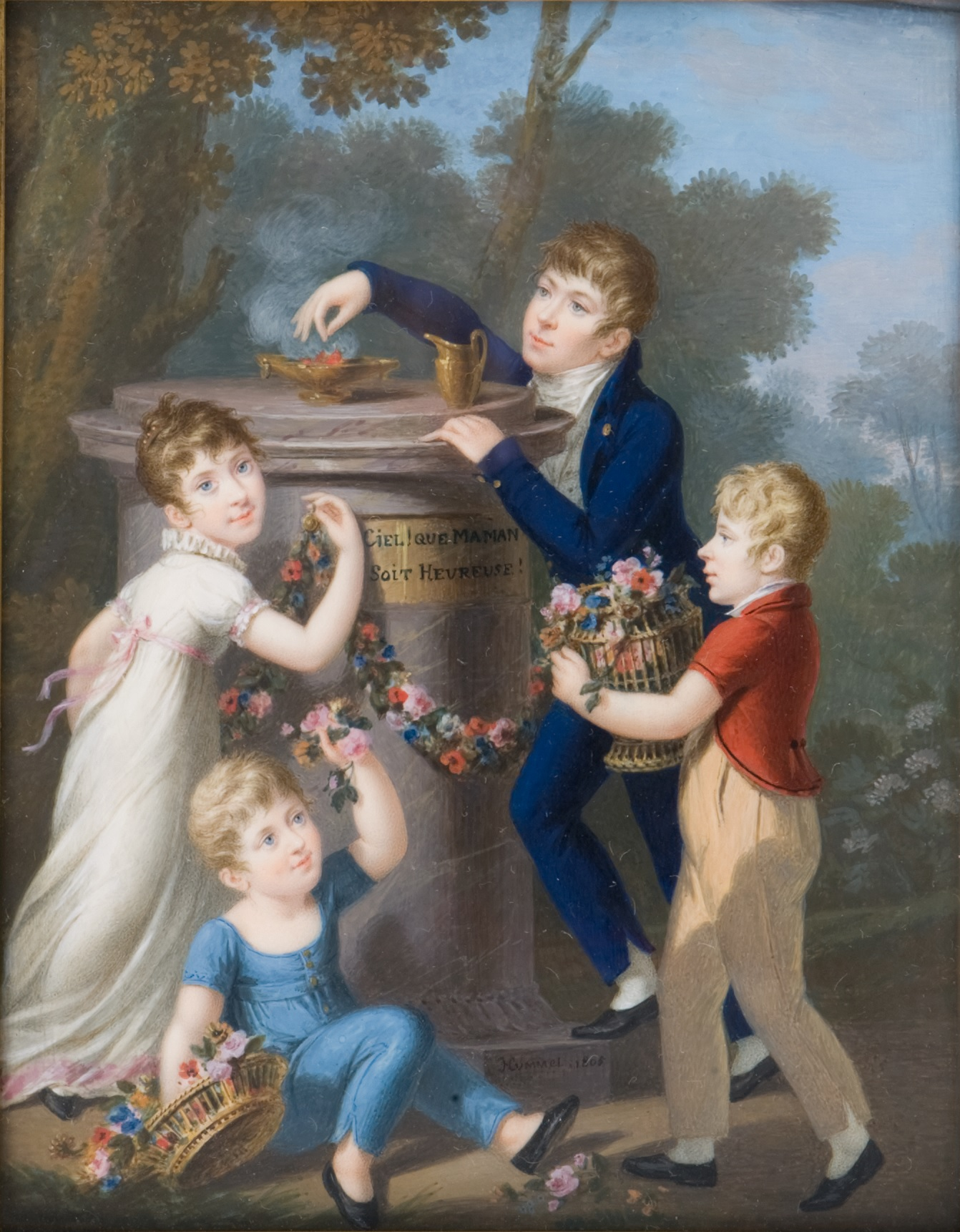
Children of Count Anton Lanckoroński (1805)

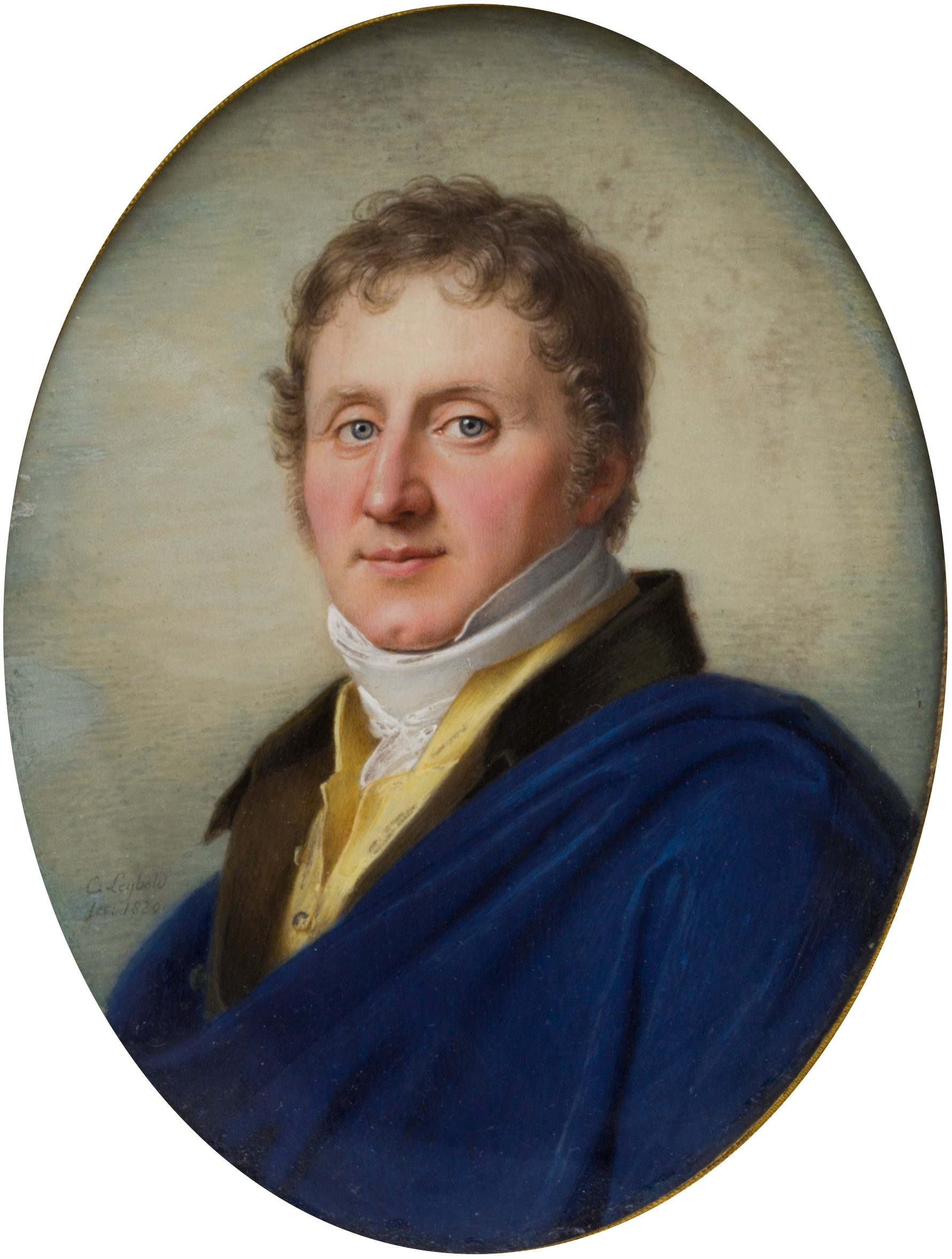
Count Kazimierz Lanckoroński (1802–1874)

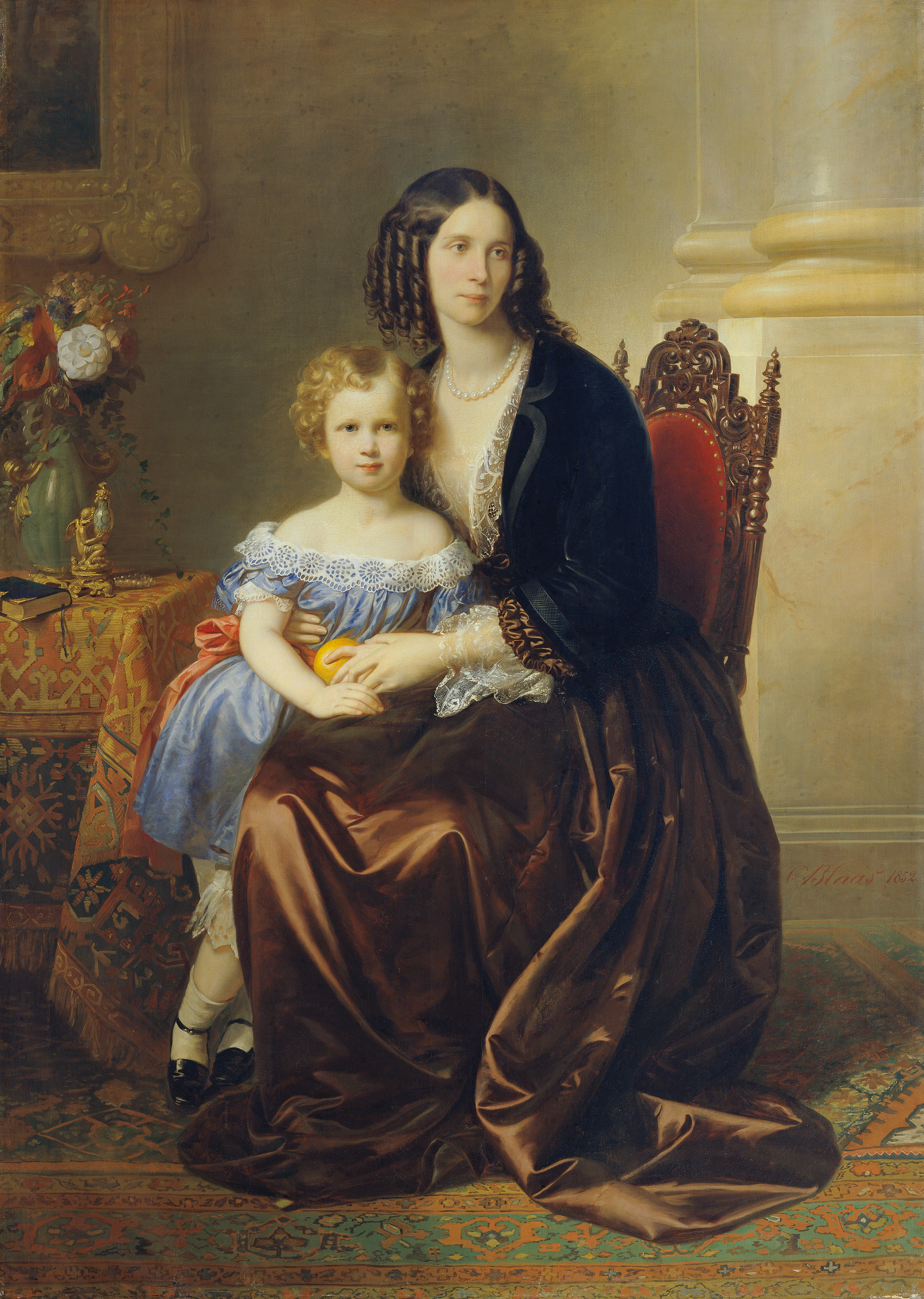
Countess Leonie Lanckorońska, née Countess Potocka (1821–1893)

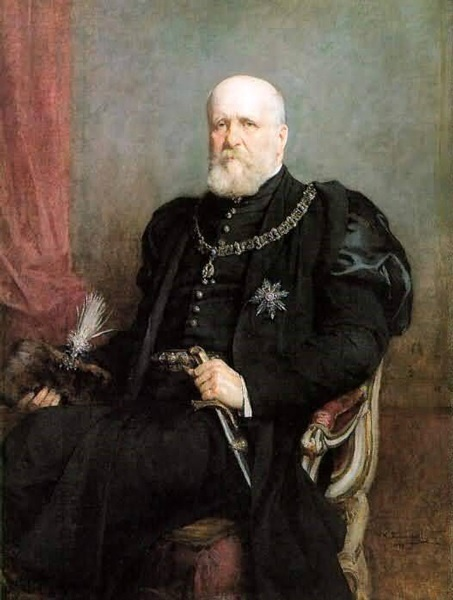
Count Karol Lanckoroński (1848–1933)

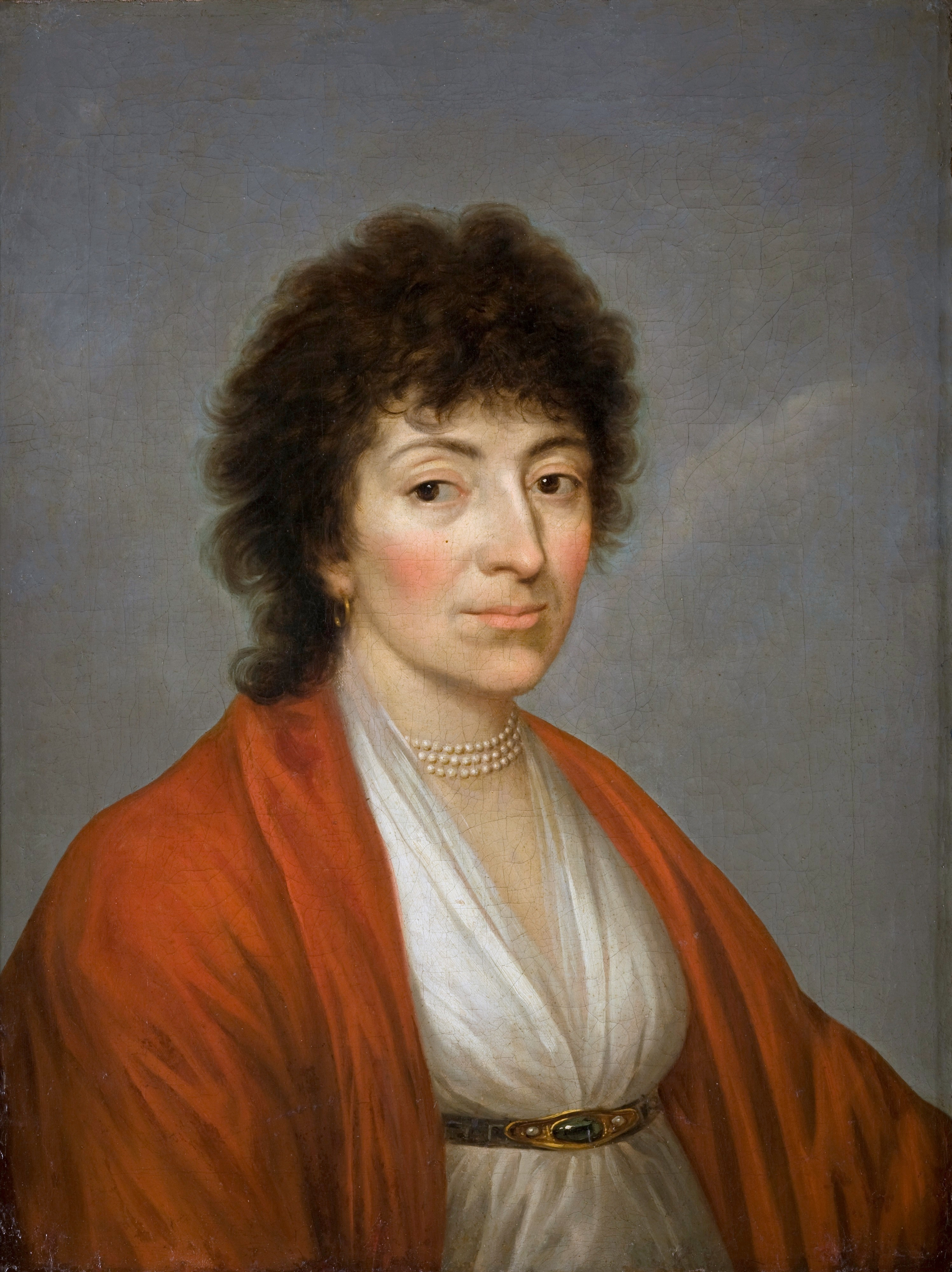
Countess Justyna Lanckorońska (d. 1829)

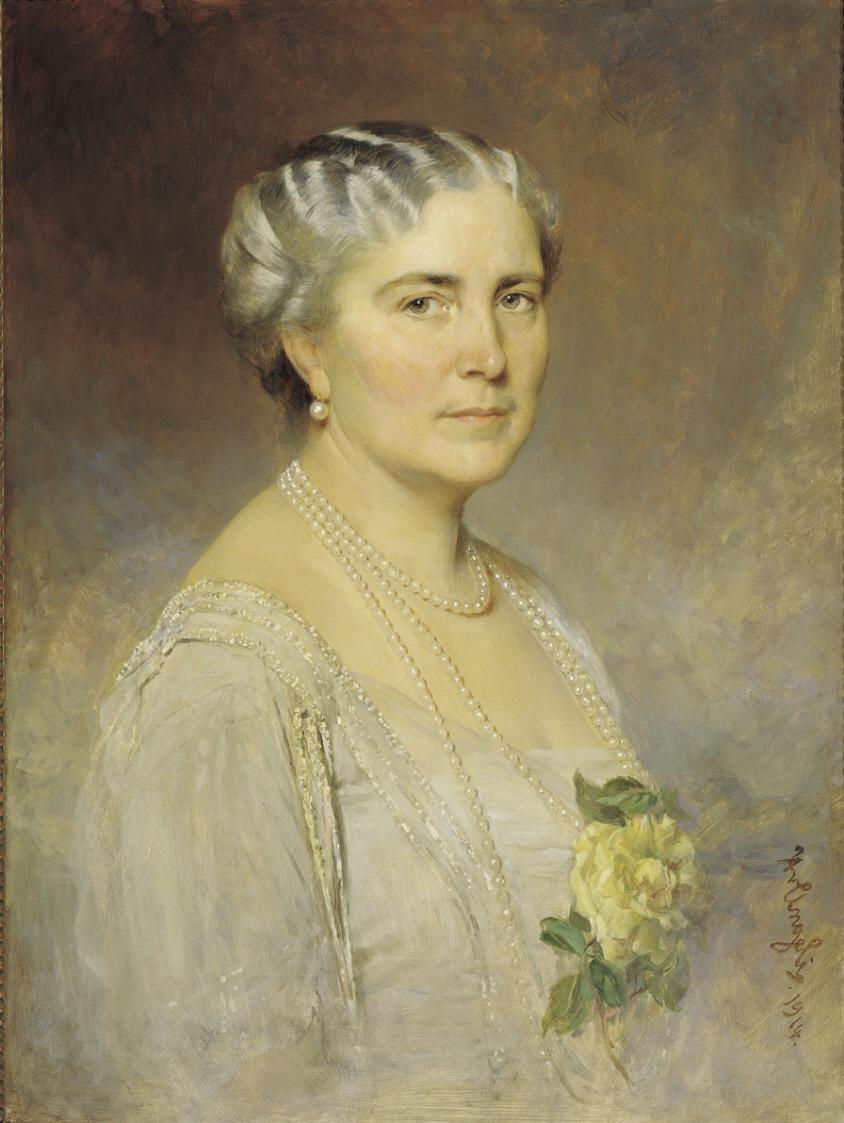
Countess Margarethe Lanckorońska, née Countess Lichnowska (1863–1957)

== See also ==
- Polish magnates
- szlachta
