= Krzysztof Kąkolewski =

Polish author, scholar, and investigative journalist (1930–2015)

- Born: 16 March 1930; Suchedniów near Warsaw
- Died: 24 May 2015 (aged 85); Warsaw, Poland
- Education: Warsaw University
- Occupation: Writer
- Writing career
- Language: Polish
- Genres: Non-fiction, mystery
- Subjects: History, current events
- Notable work: Umarły cmentarz (about the Kielce pogrom)
- Notable awards: Order of Polonia Restituta

Krzysztof Kąkolewski (16 March 1930 – 24 May 2015) was a Polish book author, life-long scholar and investigative journalist considered the pillar of the Polish school of reportage, as well as a dramatist and screenwriter. He graduated from the Faculty of Journalism in the Warsaw University in 1954 and continued his studies at the University of Strasbourg in 1961. For some 40 years afterwards, he served as a lecturer at his alma mater in the Faculty of Journalism and Political Science between 1964 and 2004. Kąkolewski himself, became the subject of a TV documentary produced by Telewizja Polska as well as biography written by Marta Sieciechowicz and published in 2009 by Von Borowiecky publishing house as Potwór z Saskiej Kępy (Hellion of Saska Kępa), ISBN 9788360748121. He was the author of over 30 non-fiction books with the total circulation of 1.5 million copies, and the recipient of numerous national awards and honours.

== Life ==
Kąkolewski was born in Suchedniów near Warsaw, nine years before invasion of Poland by Nazi Germany and the Soviet Union. His father was a lawyer, killed during the Siege of Warsaw in 1939. Kąkolewski published his first novella at the age of 48, after nearly three decades of often controversial (from the communist standpoint), but highly popular non-fiction works about events in Poland's postwar history. He interviewed former Nazi criminals living safely in Western Germany, e.g. Hans Fleischhacker, Heinz Reinefarth, subsequently described in his book Co u pana słychać? published in 1975, 1978, and 1981. His criminal novel based on authentic MO police records Zbrodniarz, który ukradł zbrodnię was filmed in 1969, as one of the best Polish movies of the time, starring Zygmunt Hübner and Barbara Brylska. Kąkolewski wrote an entire book about the seminal postwar novel Ashes and Diamonds written by Jerzy Andrzejewski and filmed by Andrzej Wajda. He also wrote a monograph about Stalin-induced terror in the Kielce region, leading to Kielce pogrom of 1946 in postwar Poland.

== Books by Krzysztof Kąkolewski ==
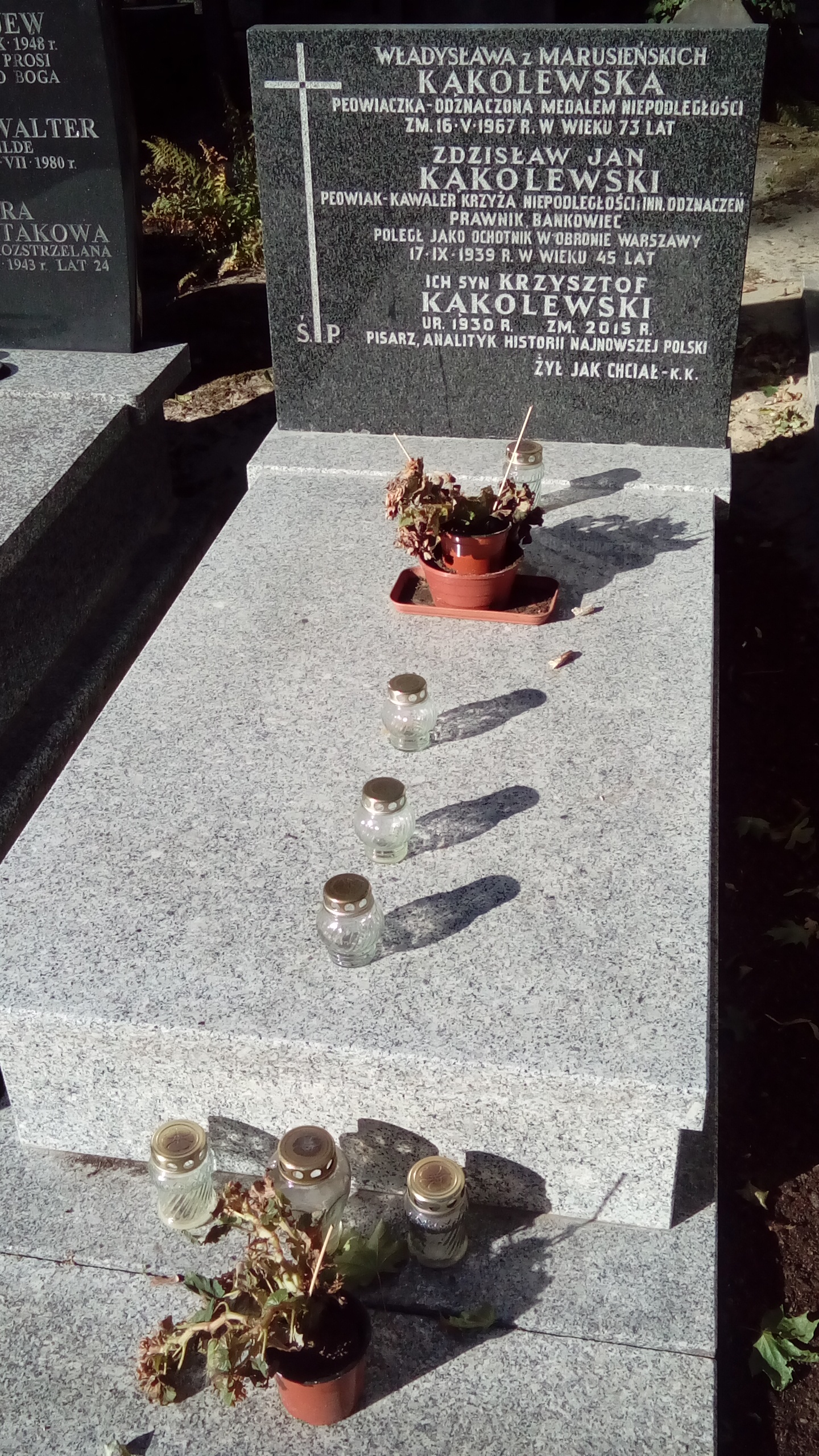

- Książę oszustów, Iskry, Warszawa 1959
- Zbawiciel świata porwany, Iskry, Warszawa 1960
- Sześciu niewidzialnych, MON, Warszawa 1960
- Trzy złote za słowo, Iskry, Warszawa 1964
- Umarli jeżdżą bez biletu, Iskry, Warszawa 1965
- Ku początkowi świata, Iskry, Warszawa 1966
- Dwadzieścia dwie historie, które napisało życie, Iskry, Warszawa 1967
- Zbrodniarz, który ukradł zbrodnię, Iskry, Warszawa 1969
- Uderzenie, Biuro Wyd. Ruch, Warszawa 1971
- Jak umierają nieśmiertelni (about Sharon Tate and Roman Polański), Iskry, Warszawa 1973
- Wańkowicz krzepi (wywiad – rzeka), Czytelnik, Warszawa 1973
- Co u pana słychać?, Czytelnik, Warszawa 1975
- Baśnie udokumentowane, Iskry, Warszawa 1976
- Na sto czterdziestym kilometrze w lewo, Wydawnictwo Literackie, Kraków 1978
- Biała Księga. Sprawa Dolezalka (cd. tzw. "nazistowskiej serii"), Czytelnik, Warszawa 1981
- Notatka, KiW, Warszawa 1982
- W złą godzinę, Wydawnictwo Literackie, Kraków 1983
- Dziennik tematów, cz.1 – 1984, cz.2 – 1985, Iskry, Warszawa
- Sądy i sondy, cz.1 – 1985
- Lato bez wakacji, Wydawnictwo Literackie, Kraków 1987
- Sygnet z jastrzębiem, KiW, Warszawa 1988
- Wydanie św. Maksymiliana w ręce oprawców, Polonia, Warszawa 1989
- Sądy i sądy cz. 2 – 1991
- Szukanie Beegera. Opowiadania gojowskie, Słowo, Warszawa 1993
- Diament odnaleziony w popiele, Trio, Warszawa 1995
- Umarły cmentarz (about the Kielce pogrom), von borowiecky, Warszawa 1996
- Mięso papugi, von borowiecky, Warszawa 1997
- Najpiękniejsze i najskromniejsze, von borowiecky, Warszawa 2000
- Generałowie giną w czasie pokoju, cz. 1, von borowiecky, Warszawa 2000
- Ksiądz Jerzy w rękach oprawców (about the murder of Jerzy Popiełuszko), von borowiecky, Warszawa 2004
- Ukradli im czterysta lat, von borowiecky, Warszawa 2004
- Aforyzmy zebrane, Miniatura, Kraków 2004
- Generałowie giną w czasie pokoju. cz.2, von borowiecky, Warszawa 2005
- Widzę śmierć, Zysk i S-ka, Warszawa 2012
