= Jerzy Wójcik =

Jerzy Wójcik may refer to:

- Jerzy Wójcik (fencer)
- Jerzy Wójcik (cinematographer) (1930–2019), Polish cinematographer
