= Ewa Krzyżewska =

Polish actress

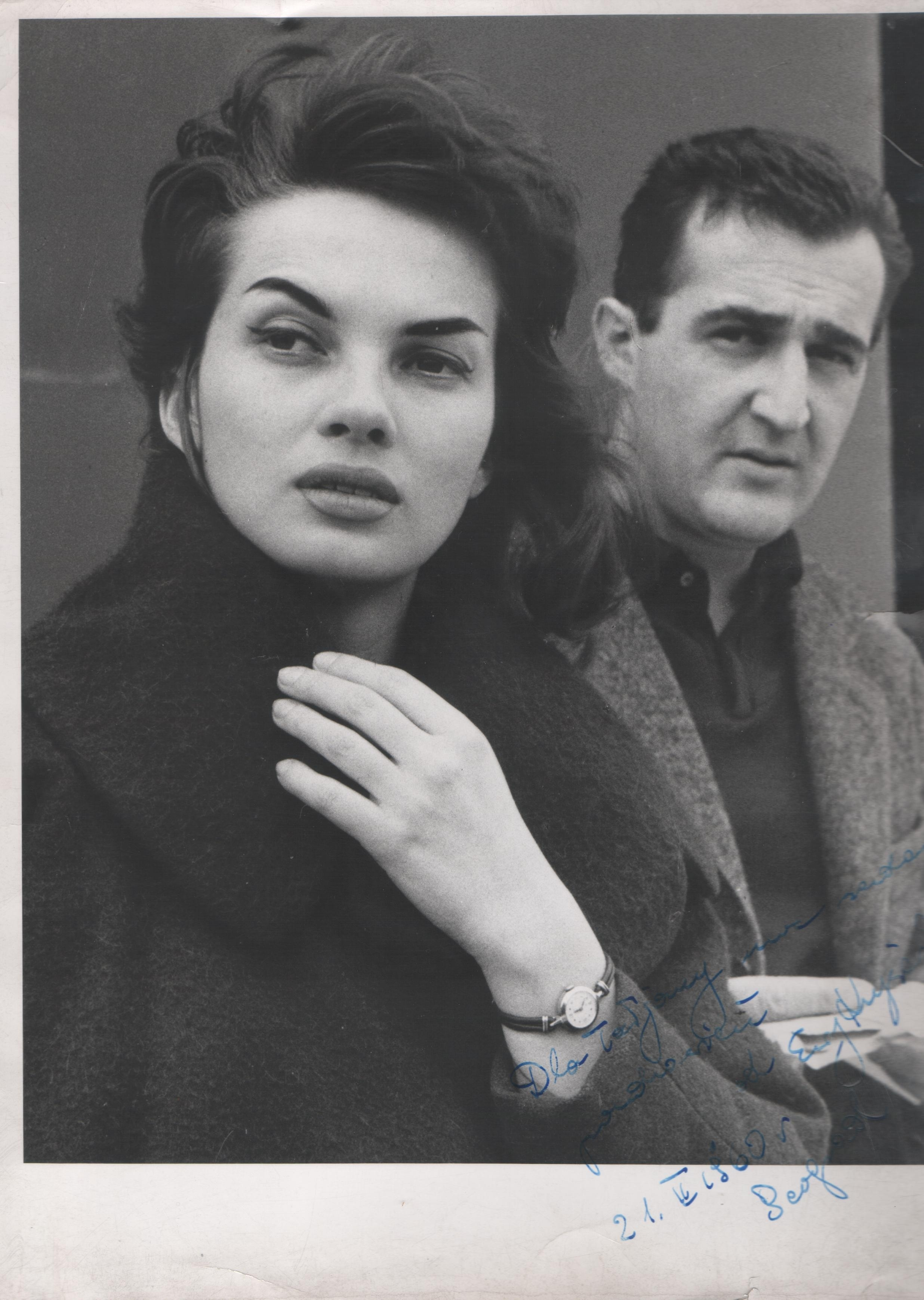
- Krzyżewska with Veljko Bulajić in 1960 on the set of Atomic War Bride
- Born: 7 February 1939; Kraków, Poland
- Died: 30 July 2003 (aged 64); Spain
- Occupation: Actress
- Years active: 1958–1973

Ewa Krzyżewska (7 February 1939 – 30 July 2003) was a Polish actress. She appeared in twenty films between 1958 and 1973.

== Selected filmography ==
- Ashes and Diamonds (1958)
- Atomic War Bride (1960)
- All Souls' Day (1962)
- Pharaoh (1966)
- The Woodpecker (1971)
