= Jerzy Wójcik (cinematographer) =

Polish cinematographer (1930–2019)

- Born: 12 September 1930; Nowy Sącz, Poland
- Died: 3 April 2019 (aged 88); Warsaw
- Occupations: Cinematographer, author of screenplays and film director

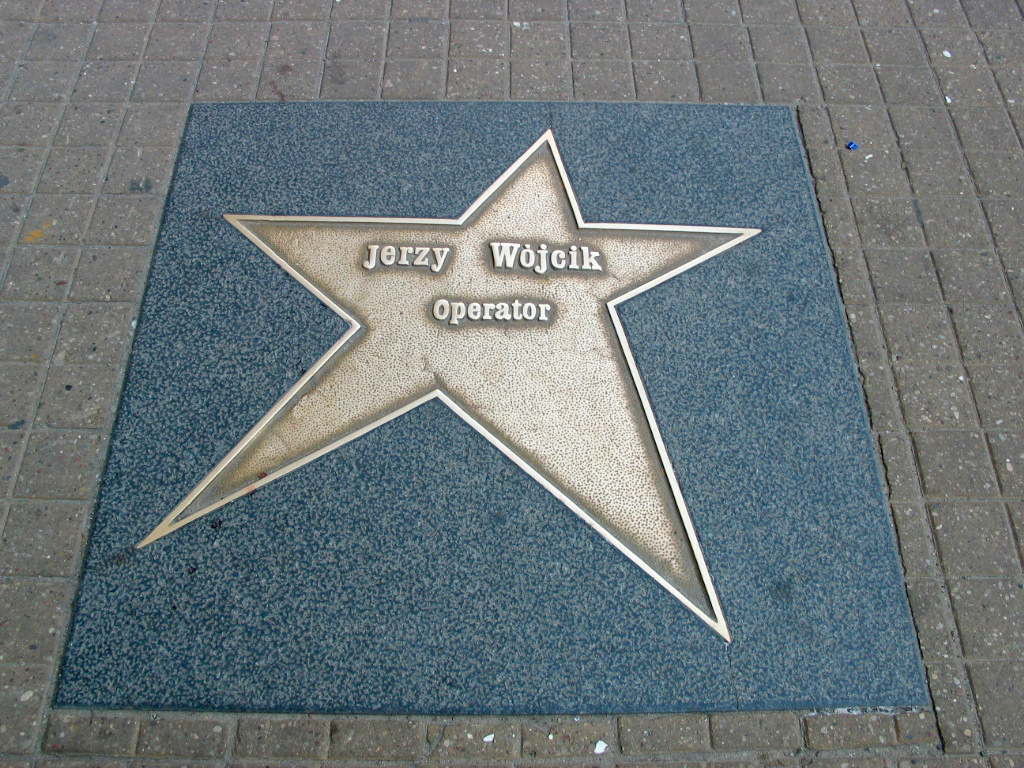
Jerzy Wojcik's star on the Łódź Walk of Fame

Jerzy Wójcik (12 September 1930 – 3 April 2019) was a Polish cinematographer, author of screenplays and film and television director, professor of University of Silesia in Katowice and Leon Schiller National Higher School of Film, Theatre and Television in Łódź.

== Biography ==
He was born the son of an officer in the 1st Regiment of Podhale Rifles, major Andrzej Wójcik. At the beginning of Second World War, in September 1939, together with his mother and brother Marian, he was evacuated to Lwów and then returned to Nowy Sącz. After the war, the Wójcik family lived in Boguszów in the Sudeten Mountains.

In 1955 he graduated from the Cinematography Department at the National Film School in Łódź and began working in the "Kadr" film team. He received his diploma in 1964. In 1956 he worked as a second cameraman under the direction of Jerzy Lipman on the pictures for Andrzej Wajda's "Kanał".

He made his debut as an independent cameraman in Andrzej Munk's "Eroica" (1958). Then he carried out, among others cinematography for Andrzej Wajda's "Ashes and Diamonds" (1958), "Mother Joan of the Angels" (1961) and "Pharaoh" (1966) by Jerzy Kawalerowicz, "Westerplatte" (1967) by Stanisław Różewicz and "The Deluge" (1973) by Jerzy Hoffman, and finally "Angel in the Closet" (1987) by Stanisław Różewicz.

In the years 1968-1970 he collaborated with Yugoslavian directors. He directed two feature films - "The Complaint" (1991) and "The Gateway of Europe", (1999) - to which he also wrote scripts. In the years 1976-1985 he also worked as a television director - he created several performances of the TV theater, among others "Joan of Arc" (1976) and "Report" (1977). He was the author of scripts for the TV theater and the "Adequate Theater".

He was a professor of film art. In the years 1981-1982 he lectured in cinematography at the Faculty of Radio and Television of the University of Silesia in Katowice, and from 1982 he lectured at the Cinematography Department of the National Film School in Łódź, initially as an associate professor, from 1988 as ordinary professor.

He was awarded many times for his work, including Officer's Cross (1998) and Commander's Cross (2005) of the Order of Polonia Restituta, the "Vitae Valor" prize for lifetime achievement at the 3rd Film Festival "Vitae Valor" in Tarnów (2003), Lifetime Achievement Award for "Golden Camera 300" at the International Manaki brothers Film Festival in Bitola in Macedonia (1999).

He was the honorary chairman of the Association of Film Image Designers.

In 2006, he published the book 'Labyrinth of Light", containing his thoughts and professional memories, in 2017. "The Art of Film" - a collection of lectures delivered in the years 2000-2003 at the University of Warsaw.

His wife was the actress Magda Teresa Wójcik, his son is a physicist, set designer and poster artist Tomasz Wójcik.

== Filmography (selection) ==
- The Gateway of Europe (1999)
- Woman in a Hat (1985)
- The Deluge (1974)
- Pharaoh (1966)
- Samson (1961)
- Mother Joan of the Angels (1961)
- Ashes and Diamonds (1958)
- Eroica (1958)

== Other works ==
- Jerzy Wójcik: Labirynt Światła (The Labyrinth of Light) : Canonia, Warszawa, 2006, ISBN 83-923967-0-7
- Jerzy Wójcik: Sztuka filmowa (The art of the film) : Canonia, Warszawa, 2017, ISBN 978-83-946851-0-2
