= Tomasz Wójcik =

Polish graphic designer, stage designer and theater director

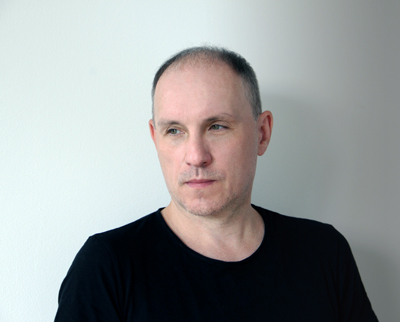
Tomasz Wójcik (2016)

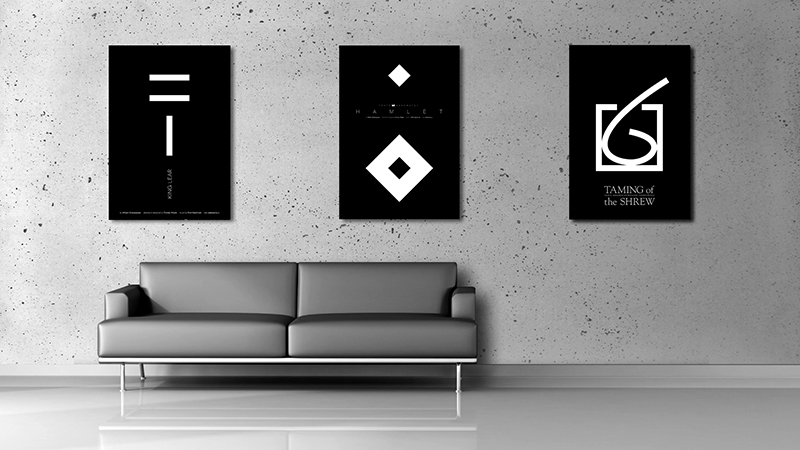
Posters for Shakespeare's plays (from left side:): King Lear, Hamlet and The Taming of the Shrew

Tomasz Wójcik (born 6 June 1963 in Warsaw) is a Polish graphic designer, stage designer, theater director and doctor of physical sciences. Creates posters for plays, films, festivals and cultural events and promoting public awareness campaigns.

== Early life ==
Tomasz Wójcik was born as son of the cinematographer, professor of the National Film School in Łódź, Jerzy Wójcik and the film and theater actress Magda Teresa Wójcik. He studied physics on the Warsaw University of Technology and received his doctorate under professor Jan Petykiewicz in 1996.

== Works ==
His posters were exhibited at numerous exhibitions including International Poster Biennial in Wilanów, Lahti Poster Biennial, International Biennial of the Poster in Mexico City, Trnava Poster Triennial. Poster for the Polish film The complaint (Skarga) was named the best poster on Human Rights Watch International Film Festival in Strasbourg, France (1992)

Since 1986, Tomasz Wójcik designs stage sets and theatrical costumes. He is the author of 50 projects, both for performances of classical works, such as Antigone by Sophocles, Bhagavad Gita based on the Mahabharata, Richard III by William Shakespeare, as well as modern texts, such as: The Process by Franz Kafka, The Plague by Albert Camus, The Emperor by Ryszard Kapuściński.

In 1991 he made his debut as a theater director carrying out spectacle of Die Panne by Friedrich Dürrenmatt (Teatr Adekwatny, Warsaw). He also directed the original spectacle Glare (1993, Teatr Adekwatny, Warsaw) and Macbeth by William Shakespeare (2003, Teatr Na Woli, Warsaw).

Tomasz Wójcik is member of the authorities of the Teatr Adekwatny Association and was the artistic director of their projects: Festival of Contemporary Art – Four Elements, cycles of concerts and performances Lenten Triptych, cycles of screenings and meetings with the filmmakers Animagic. He was the artistic manager of the Warsaw artistic club Lokal Użytkowy.

He is the author of several graphic projects implemented in Poland and abroad, such as: visual identification of international cooperation project of art universities Inter-artes, projects of books and magazines, among others. Labyrinth of Light (Labirynt światła) by Jerzy Wójcik (2006), Hero's expedition (Wyprawa bohatera) by Seweryn Kuśmierczyk (2014).

He designed also record covers, among others: Air by Jerzy Malek (2011), Komeda-Chopin-Komeda by Lena Ledoff (2011), As sung by Billie Holiday by Ida Zalewska (2012),

Tomasz Wójcik has also designed the exhibition to celebrate the 100th anniversary of the Warsaw School of Economics in Chicago and the exhibition Reconstitution of the Memory of Poland in the European Parliament in Brussels.

He cooperated with the TV channel Kino Polska and created a brand image of digitization project of Polish cinema masterpieces Kino RP. Wójcik collaborates with the Copernicus Science Centre in Warsaw, and Warsaw University of Technology contributing to educational projects.

== Selected exhibitions ==
- 1992: Human Rights Watch International Film Festival, Strasbourg, France
- 1995: International Biennial of Stage Posters, Rzeszów, Poland
- 1996: 4th International Biennial of the Poster in Mexico City, Mexico
- 1997: 8th Poster Salon in Polish Poster Museum, Warsaw – Wilanów, Poland
- 1997: 12th Lahti Poster Biennial, Lahti, Finland
- 1997: 6th International Biennial of Theatre Poster, Rzeszów, Poland
- 1997: Contemporary Polish Poster, Chicago, USA
- 1997: 3rd Trnava Poster Triennial, Trnava, Slovakia
- 1999: 7th International Biennial of Theatre Poster, Rzeszów, Poland
- 2000: 4th Trnava Poster Triennial, Trnava, Slovakia
- 2008: 21st International Poster Biennial, Warsaw – Wilanow, Poland
- 2009: 17th Lahti Poster Biennial, Lahti, Finland
- 2012: 15th Poster Salon in Polish Poster Museum, Warsaw – Wilanów, Poland
- 2013: 16th Poster Salon in Polish Poster Museum, Warsaw – Wilanów, Poland
- 2014: Pathless Roads – Holocaust Memorial Event, Budapest

== Stage Designs ==
- 1986: The Trial by Franz Kafka, directed by Henryk Boukołowski, Teatr Adekwatny, Warsaw, Poland
- 1986: Advice to the Players by Bruce Bonafede, directed by Wojciech Feliksiak, Teatr Adekwatny, Warsaw, Poland
- 1987: Peer Gynt by Henrik Ibsen, directed by Henryk Czyż & Henryk Boukołowski, Teatr Adekwatny, Warsaw, Poland
- 1987: The Little Prince by Antoine de Saint - Exupéry, directed by Magda Teresa Wójcik, Teatr Bagatela, Cracov, Poland
- 1987: Anhelli Family (Ród Anchellich) by Juliusz Słowacki, directed by Wojciech Feliksiak, Teatr Adekwatny, Warsaw, Poland
- 1988: Bhagavad - Gita on the basis of Mahabharata, directed by Magda Teresa Wójcik, Teatr Adekwatny, Warsaw, Poland
- 1990: Christmas Eve1956 by Istvan Eörsi, directed by Magda Teresa Wójcik & Henryk Boukołowski, Hungarian Culture Centre, Warsaw, Poland
- 1990: Robots Tales (Bajki Robotów) by Stanisław Lem, directed by Magda Teresa Wójcik, Teatr Adekwatny, Warsaw, Poland
- 1991: A Dangerous Game (Die Panne) by Friedrich Dürrenmatt, directed by Tomasz Wójcik, Teatr Adekwatny, Warsaw, Poland
- 1991: Enjoy your youth (Ciesz się swoją młodością) on the basis of mercenaries relations, directed by Wojciech Feliksiak, Teatr Adekwatny, Warsaw, Poland
- 1992: The Little Prince by Antoine de Saint - Exupéry, directed by Magda Teresa Wójcik, Teatr im. Wilama Horzycy, Toruń, Poland
- 1992: Antigone by Sophocles, directed by Henryk Boukołowski & Magda Teresa Wójcik, Teatr Adekwatny, Warsaw, Poland
- 1992: The Little Prince by Antoine de Saint - Exupèry, directed by Magda Teresa Wójcik, Haarlems Toneel, Haarlem, The Netherlands
- 1993: Pinocchio by Carlo Collodi, directed by Magda Teresa Wójcik, Teatr Adekwatny, Warsaw, Poland
- 1993: The Little Prince by Antoine de Saint - Exupèry, directed by Magda Teresa Wójcik, Teatr Współczesny, Szczecin, Poland
- 1993: Sindbad the Sailor (Sindbad Żeglarz) by Bolesław Leśmian, directed by Joanna Cichoń, Teatr Adekwatny, Warsaw, Poland
- 1993: The Defence of Warsaw - Tale about Stefan Starzyński (Obrona Warszawy – rzecz o Stefanie Starzyńskim), directed by Henryk Boukołowski, Teatr Adekwatny, Warsaw, Poland
- 1994: The Trial by Franz Kafka, directed by Henryk Boukołowski, Teatr Adekwatny, Warsaw, Poland
- 1994: Germans (Niemcy) by Leon Kruczkowski, directed by Magda Teresa Wójcik, Teatr Adekwatny, Warsaw, Poland
- 1994: Kordian by Juliusz Słowacki, directed by Henryk Boukołowski, Teatr Adekwatny, Warsaw, Poland
- 1996: Cyd (Le Cid) by Pierre Corneille, directed by Tomasz Konieczny, Teatr Na Woli, Warsaw, Poland
- 1996: Legends of Warsaw Old Town (Legendy Warszawskiej Starówki) by Or - Ot, directed by Magda Teresa Wójcik & Henryk Boukołowski, Old Town (the open air), Warsaw, Poland
- 1996: Gelsomino by Gianni Rodari, directed by Henryk Boukołowski, Teatr Dramatyczny, Warsaw, Poland
- 1997: Mister Thaddeus (Pan Tadeusz) by Adam Mickiewicz, directed by Magda Teresa Wójcik, Teatr Kameralny, Warsaw, Poland
- 1997: Richard III by William Shakespeare, directed by Henryk Boukołowski, Teatr Kameralny, Warsaw, Poland
- 1997: The Greek Myths by Robert Graves, directed by Magda Teresa Wójcik & Tomasz Konieczny, Teatr Kameralny, Warsaw, Poland
- 1998: Mickiewicz’s fables (Bajki Mickiewicza) by Adam Mickiewicz, directed by Henryk Boukołowski, Teatr Dramatyczny, Warsaw, Poland
- 1998: Talking with an oppressor (Rozmowy z katem) by Kazimierz Moczarski, directed by Magda Teresa Wójcik, Teatr Kameralny, Warsaw, Poland
- 1998: National Nights (Noce Narodowe) by Roman Braendstetter, directed by Włodzimierz Szpak, Jarosław Iwaszkewicz Museum, Podkowa Leśna, Poland
- 1999: Kordian by Juliusz Słowacki, directed by Henryk Boukołowski, Teatr Kameralny, Warsaw, Poland
- 1999: The Miser (L'Avare) by Moliere, directed by Magda Teresa Wójcik, Teatr Kameralny, Warsaw, Poland
- 2000: Plague (La Peste) by Albert Camus, directed by Magda Teresa Wójcik, Teatr Kameralny, Warsaw, Poland
- 2001: Fircyk in advances (Fircyk w zalotach) by Franciszek Zabłocki, directed by Joanna Cichoń, Teatr Kameralny, Warsaw, Poland
- 2001: Laments (Treny) by Jan Kochanowski, directed by Henryk Boukołowski, Teatr Dramatyczny, Warsaw, Poland
- 2001: Promethidion by Cyprian Kamil Norwid, directed by Henryk Boukołowski, ?
- 2002: The Emperor (Cesarz) by Ryszard Kapuściński, directed by Magda Teresa Wójcik, Teatr Dramatyczny, Warsaw, Poland
- 2002: Cinderella (Kopciuszek) by Jan Brzechwa, directed by Magda Teresa Wójcik, Łazienki Królewskie – Teatr na Wodzie, Warsaw, Poland
- 2002: The Dismissal of the Greek Envoys (Odprawa posłów greckich) by Jan Kochanowski, directed by Henryk Boukołowski, Teatr Dramatyczny, Warsaw, Poland
- 2003: Macbeth by William Shakespeare, directed by Tomasz Wójcik, Teatr Na Woli, Warsaw, Poland
- 2003: The Trial by Franz Kafka, directed by Henryk Boukołowski, Teatr Adekwatny, Warsaw, Poland
- 2004: Candlestick (Le chandelier) by Alfred de Musset, directed by Henryk Boukołowski, Jarosław Iwaszkewicz Museum, Podkowa Leśna, Poland
- 2004: Improvisations (Improwizacje) by Adam Mickiewicz, directed by Henryk Boukołowski, Teatr Na Woli, Warsaw, Poland
- 2005: Faceting death (In articulo mortis) on the basis of works of Baczyński, Gajcy, Wierzyński, Trzebiński, directed by Magda Teresa Wójcik, Teatr na Woli, Warsaw, Poland
- 2006: Wait full of light (Świetliste oczekiwanie) by Jan Lechoń, directed by Magda Teresa Wójcik, Teatr Na Woli, Warsaw, Poland

== Selected Scientific Publications ==
- 1997: T. Wójcik, B. Rubinowicz, Influence of the cross-modulation effect on intensity of waves transmitted through a non-linear Fabry-Perot cavity, Opt. App. Vol. XXVII, No. 1
- 1997: T. Wójcik, B. Rubinowicz, Influence of the cross-modulation effect on the polarization states of waves transmitted through a non-linear Fabry-Perot cavity, Opt. Quant. Elect. 29 725–737
- 1998: B. Rubinowicz, T. Wójcik, Influence of the Kerr medium type on the wave’s reflection states at nonlinear interface for different angles of incidence, J. Opt. Soc. Am. A Vol.15 Iss.5 1436–1449
- 1998: T. Wójcik, B. Rubinowicz, Two-wave reflection at nonlinear interface, J. Opt. Soc. Am B Vol.15 Iss.7 1856–1864

== Theatre posters ==
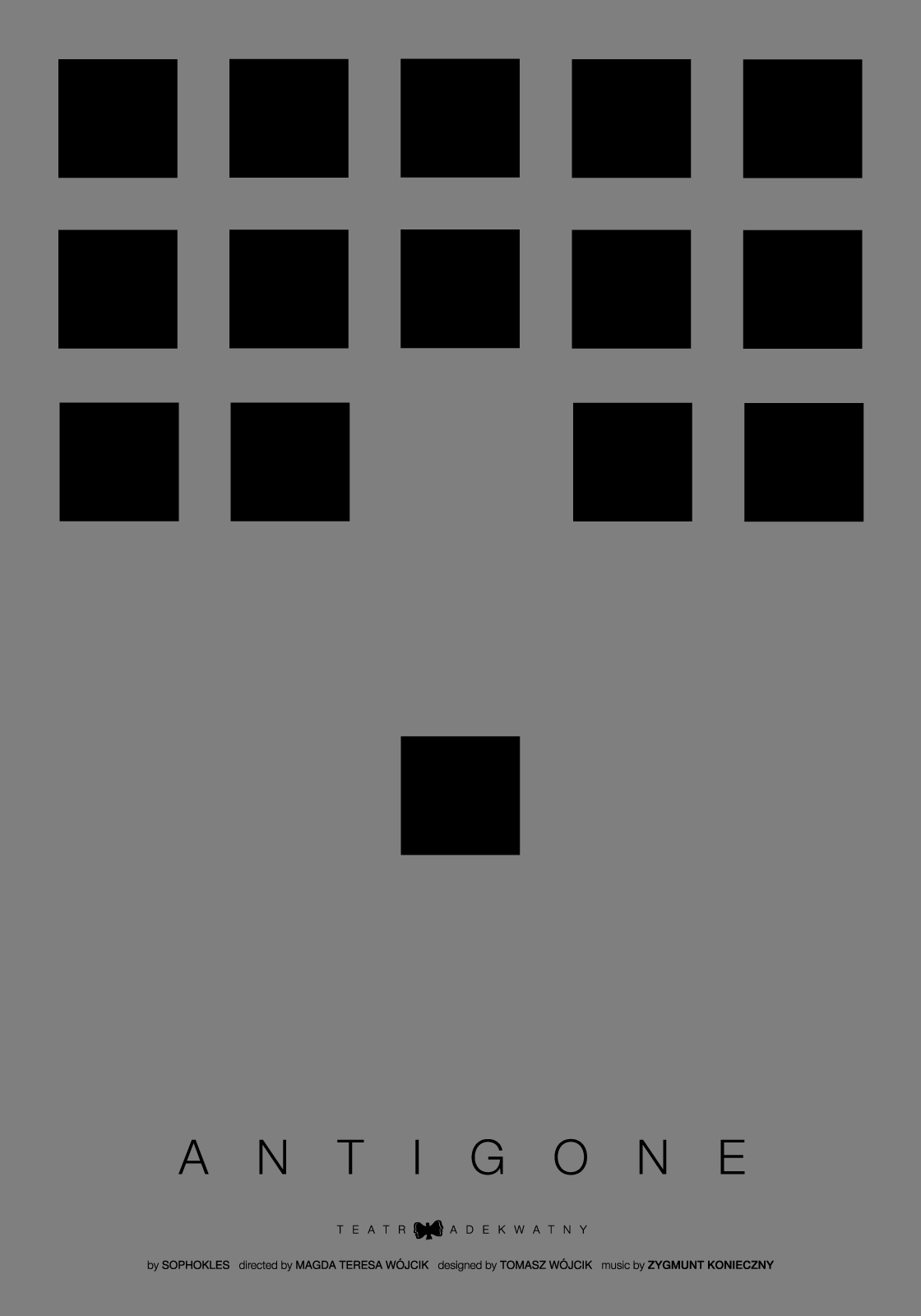
Antigone

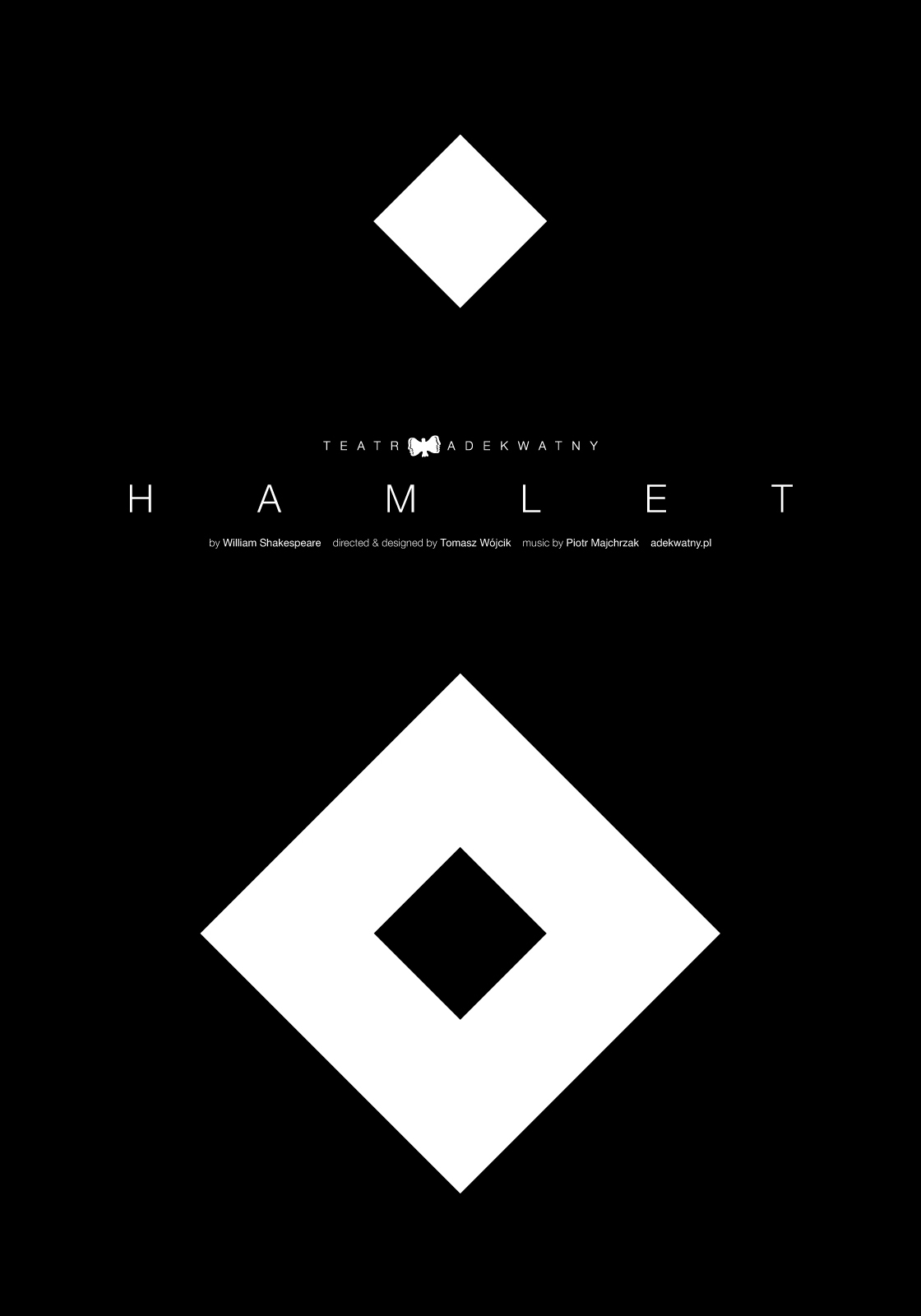
Hamlet

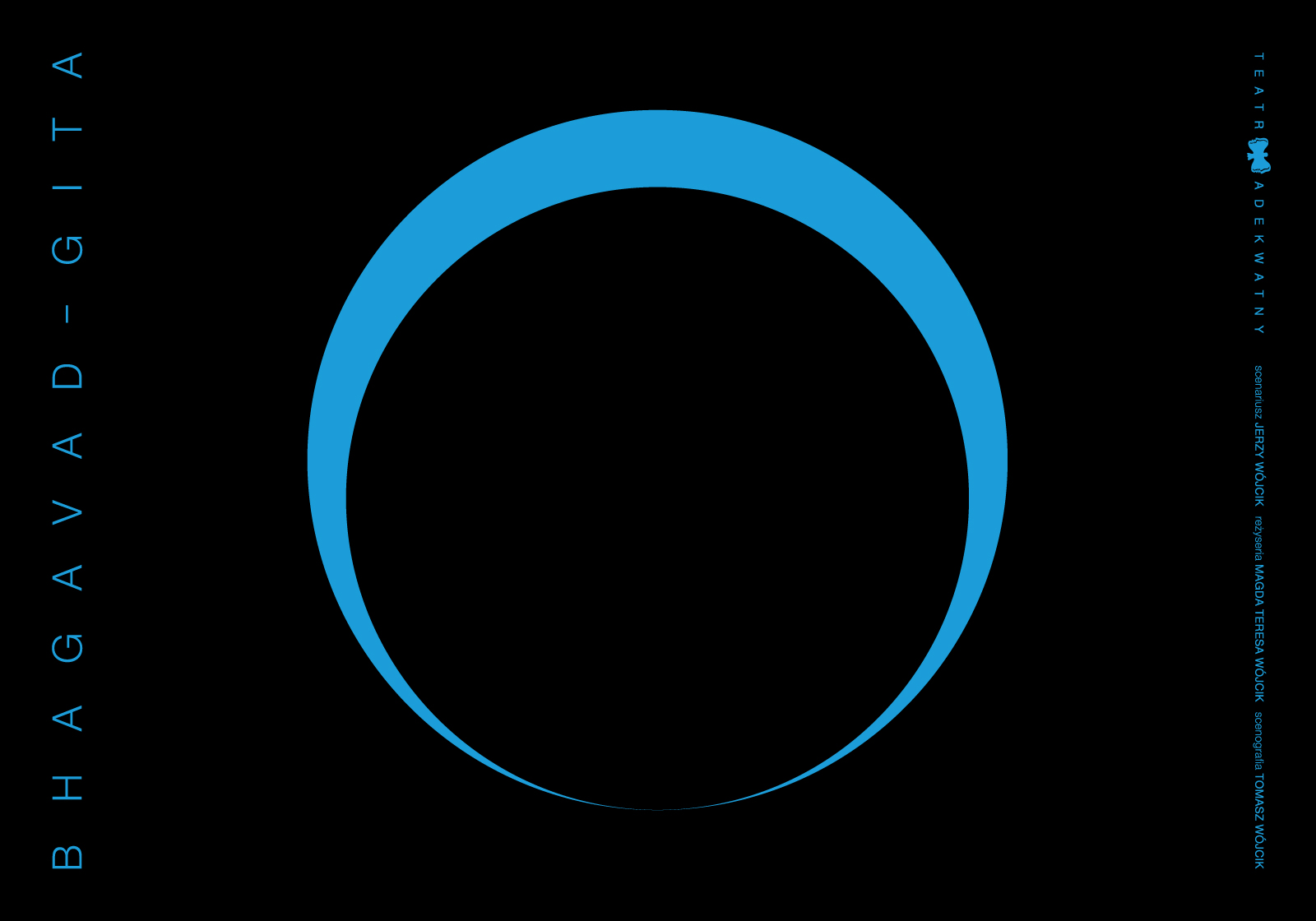
Bhagavad Gita

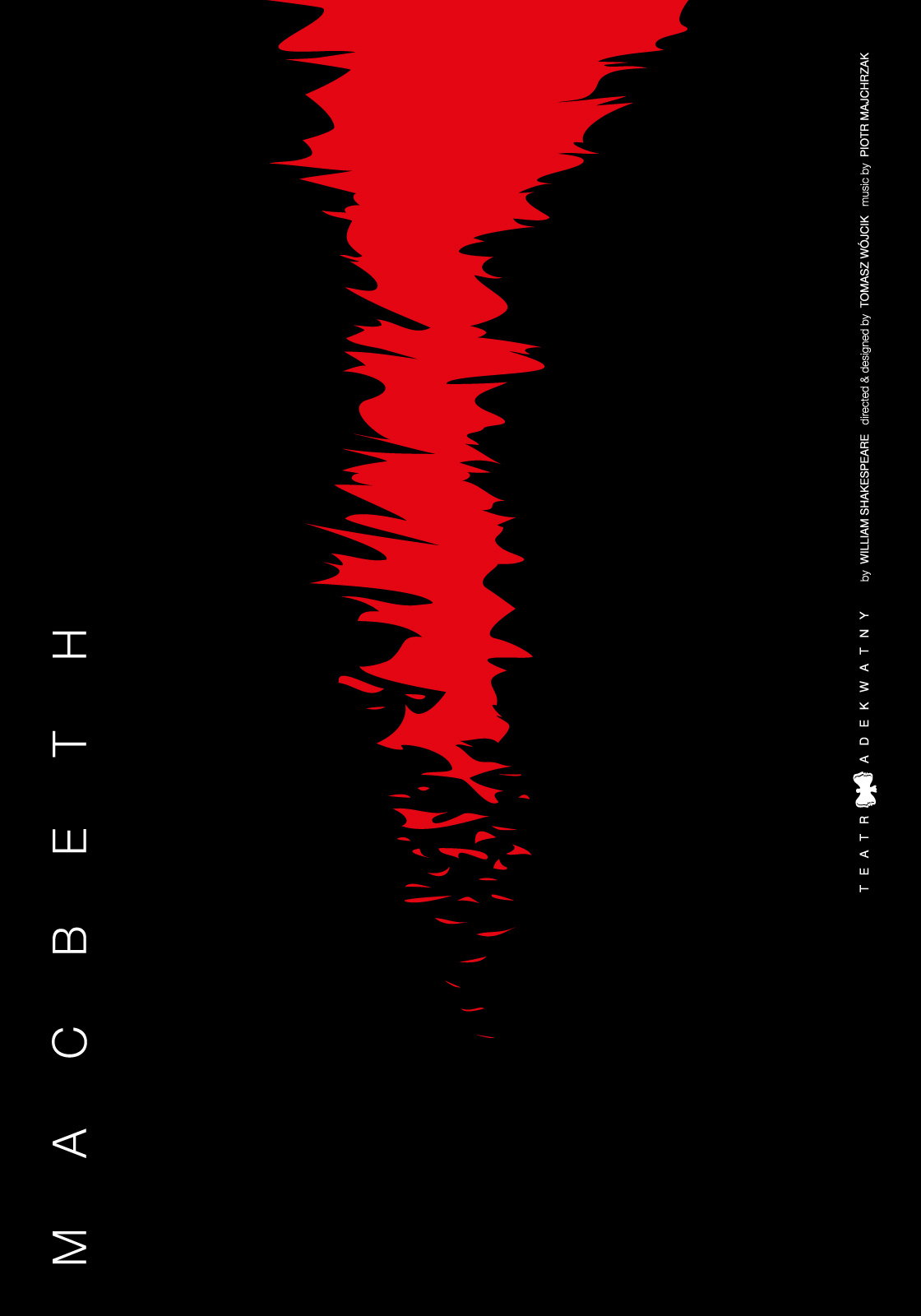
Macbeth

== Film posters ==
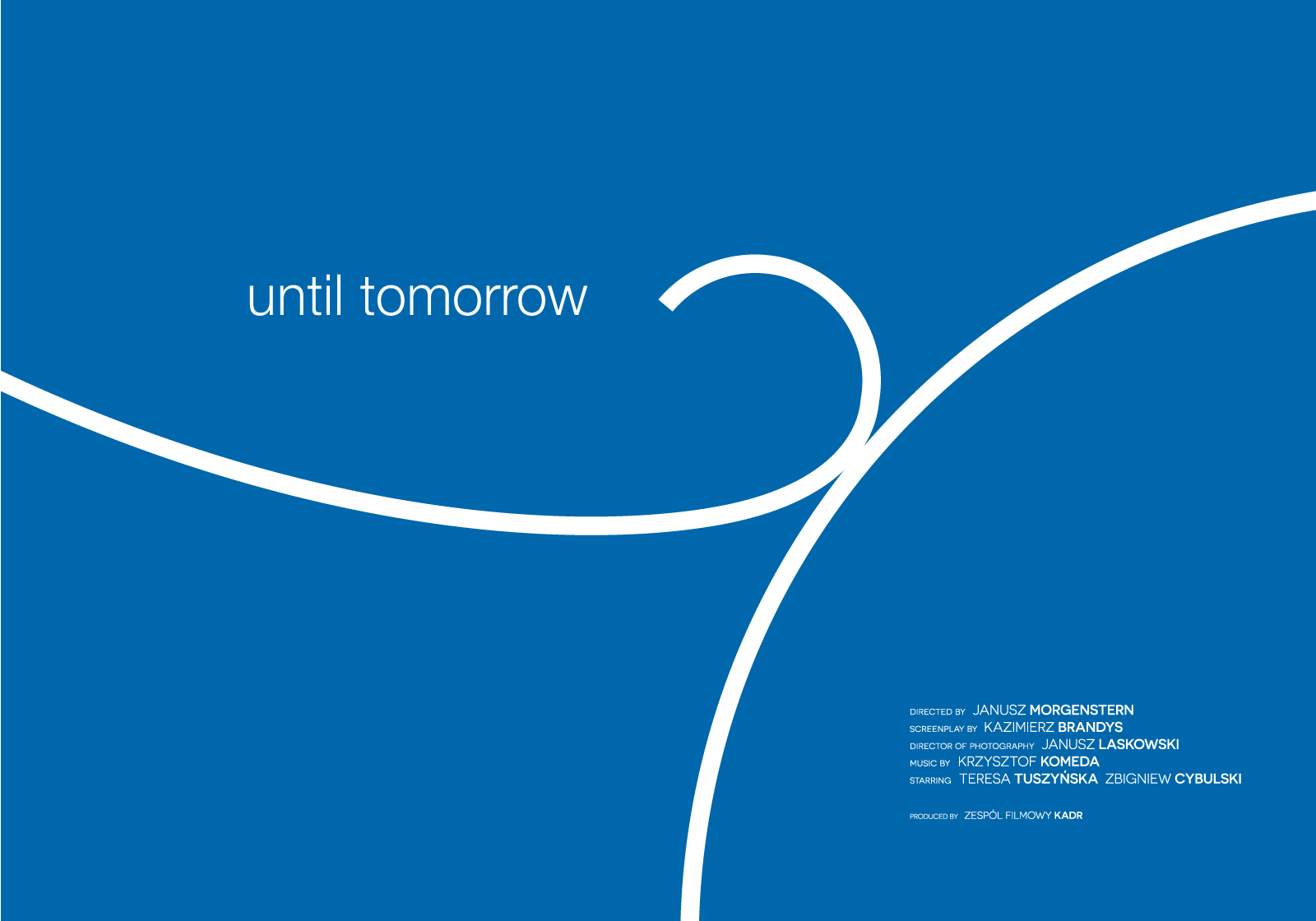
Until Tomorrow

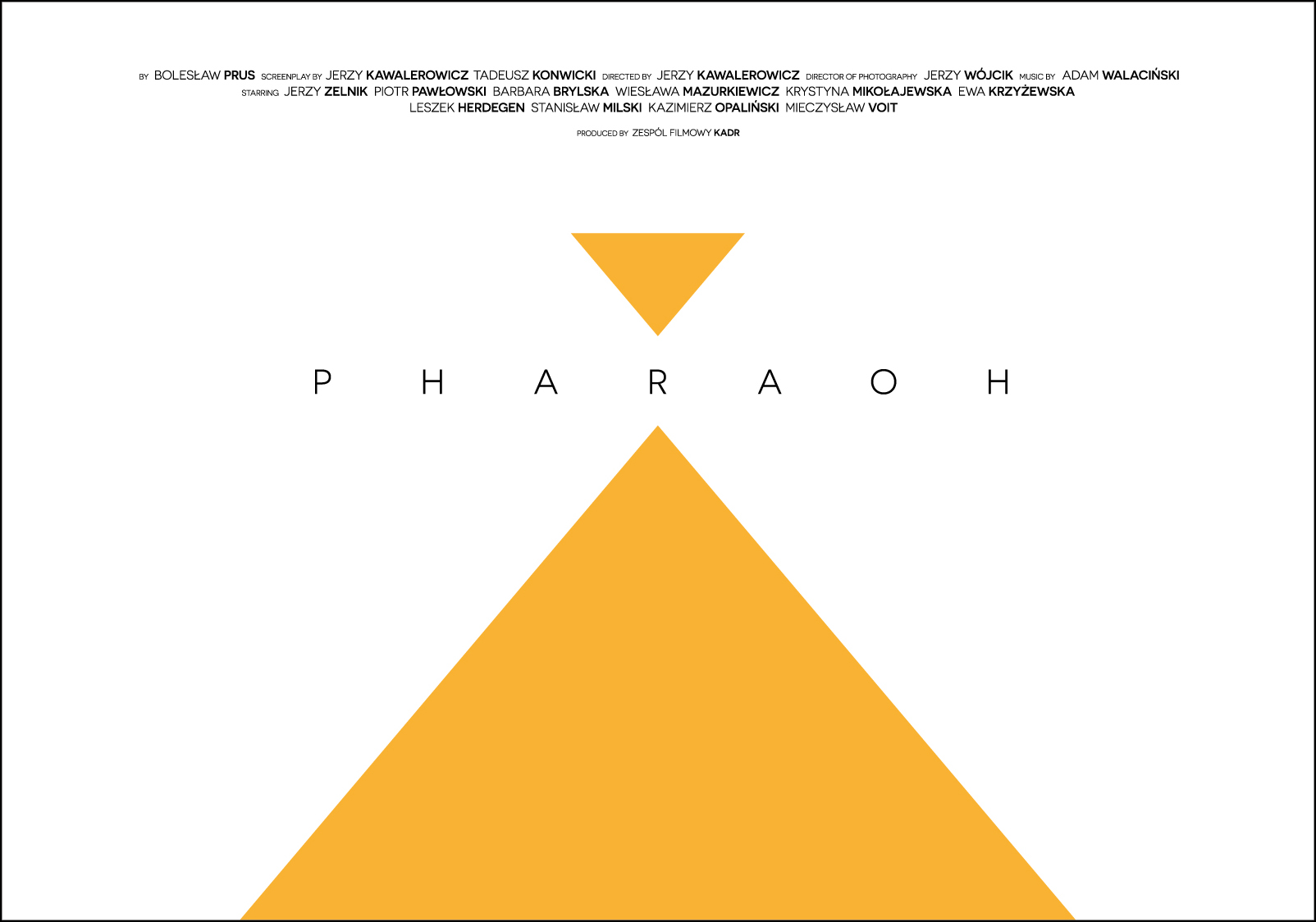
Pharaoh

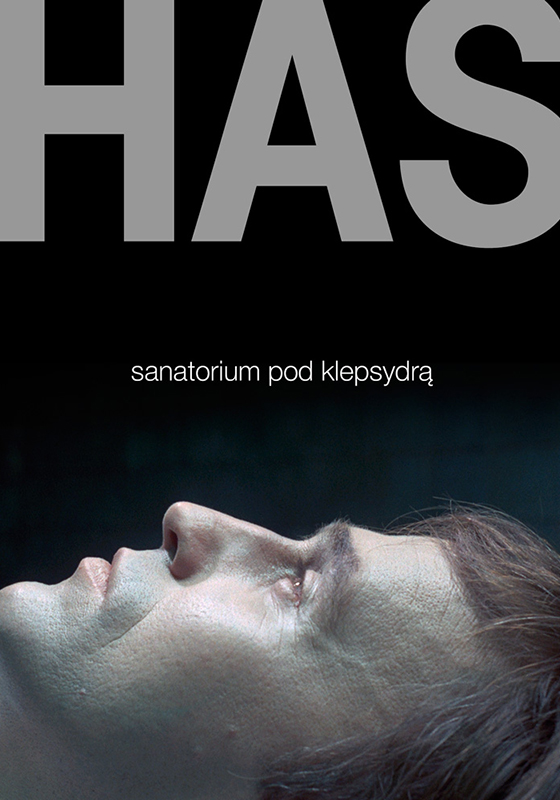
Has

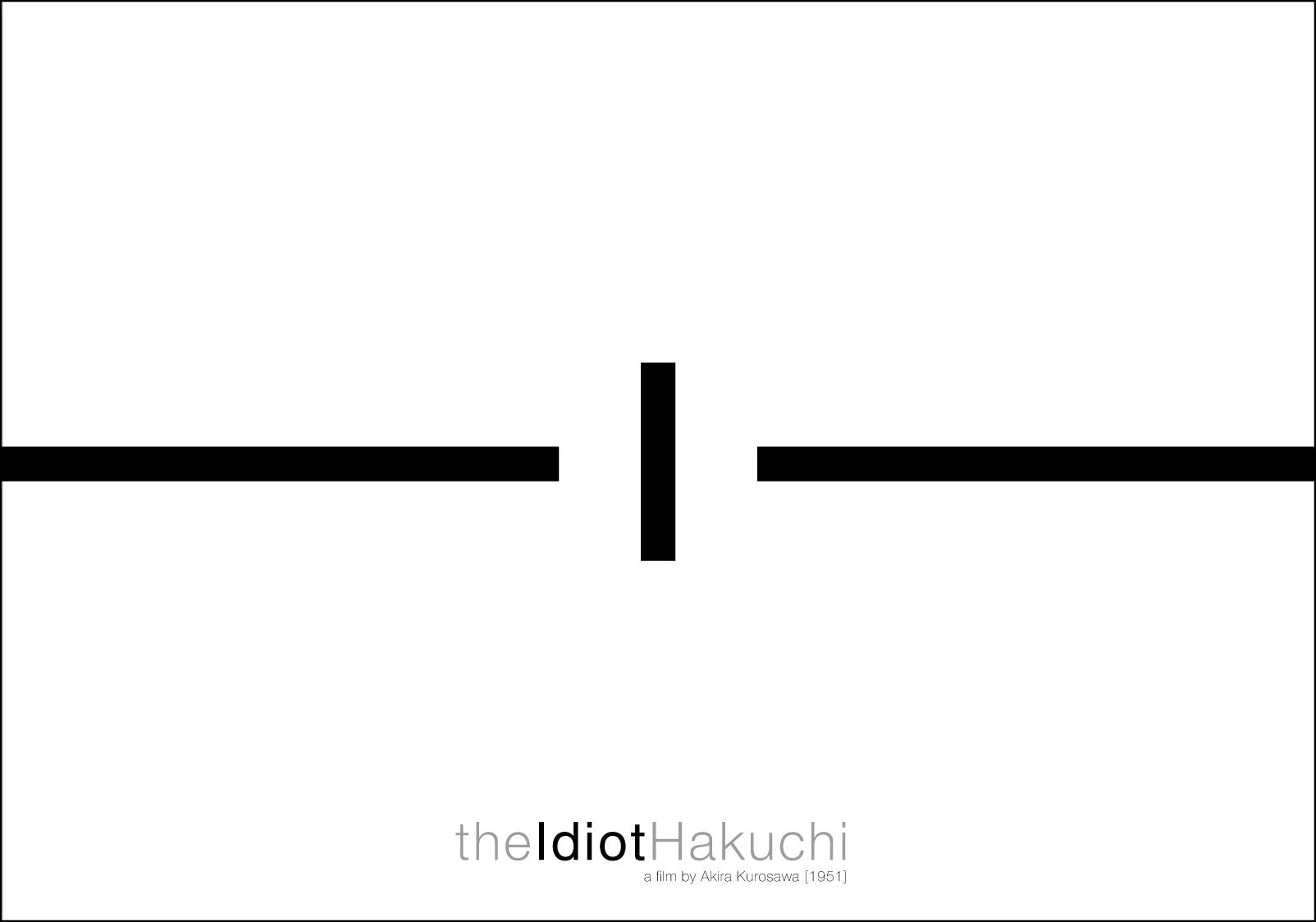
The Idiot

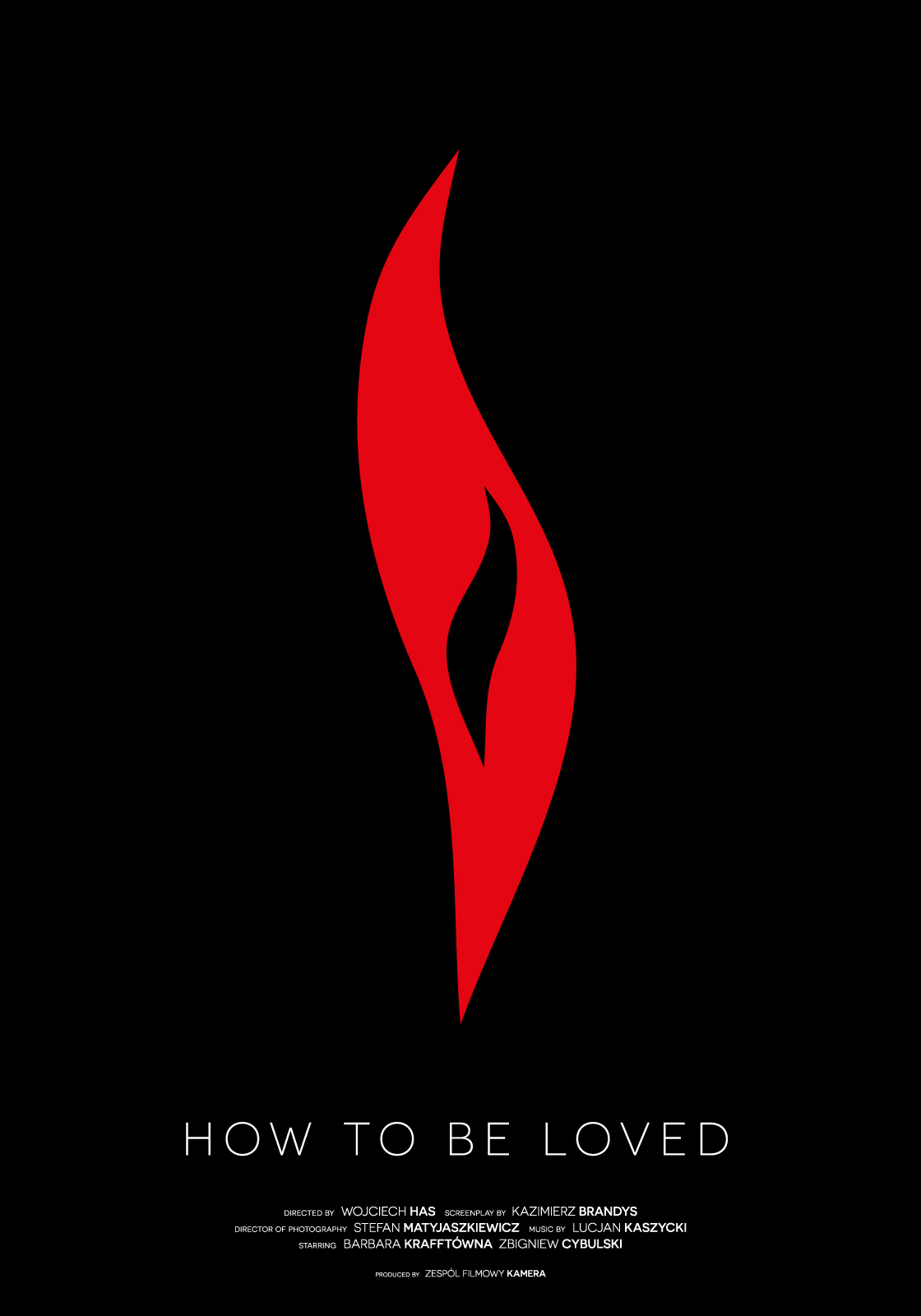
How to be loved

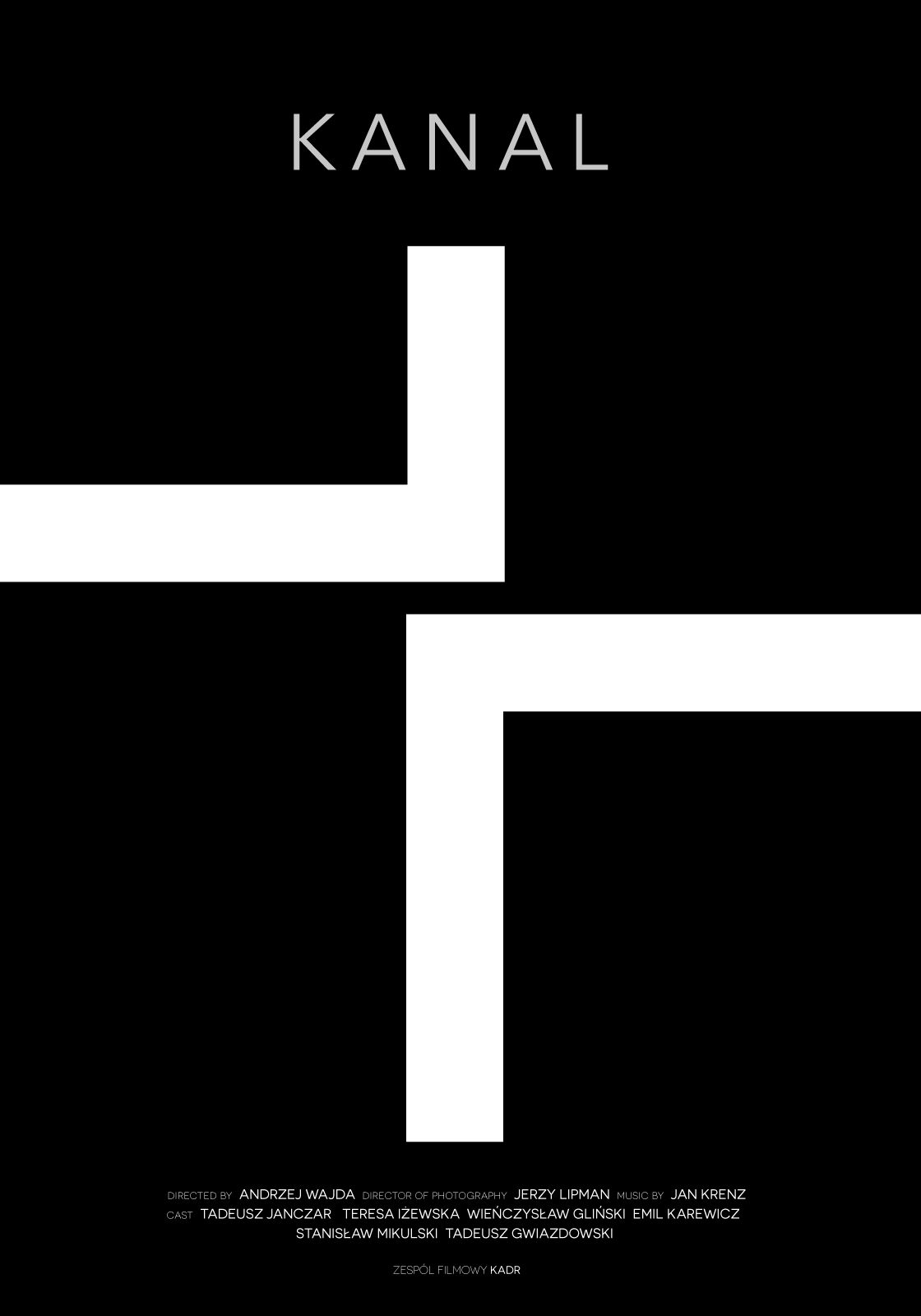
The Sewer

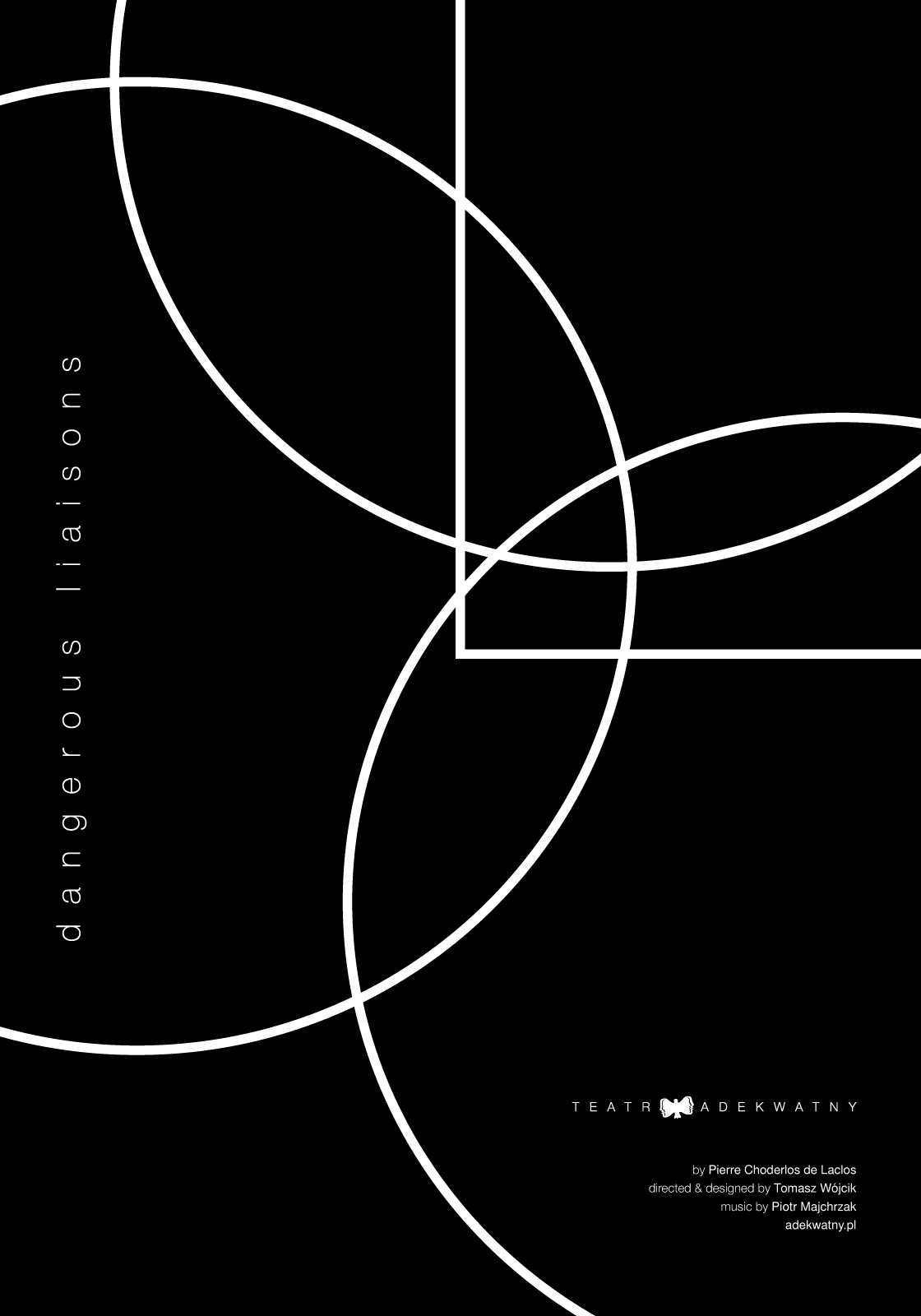
Dangerous Liaisons

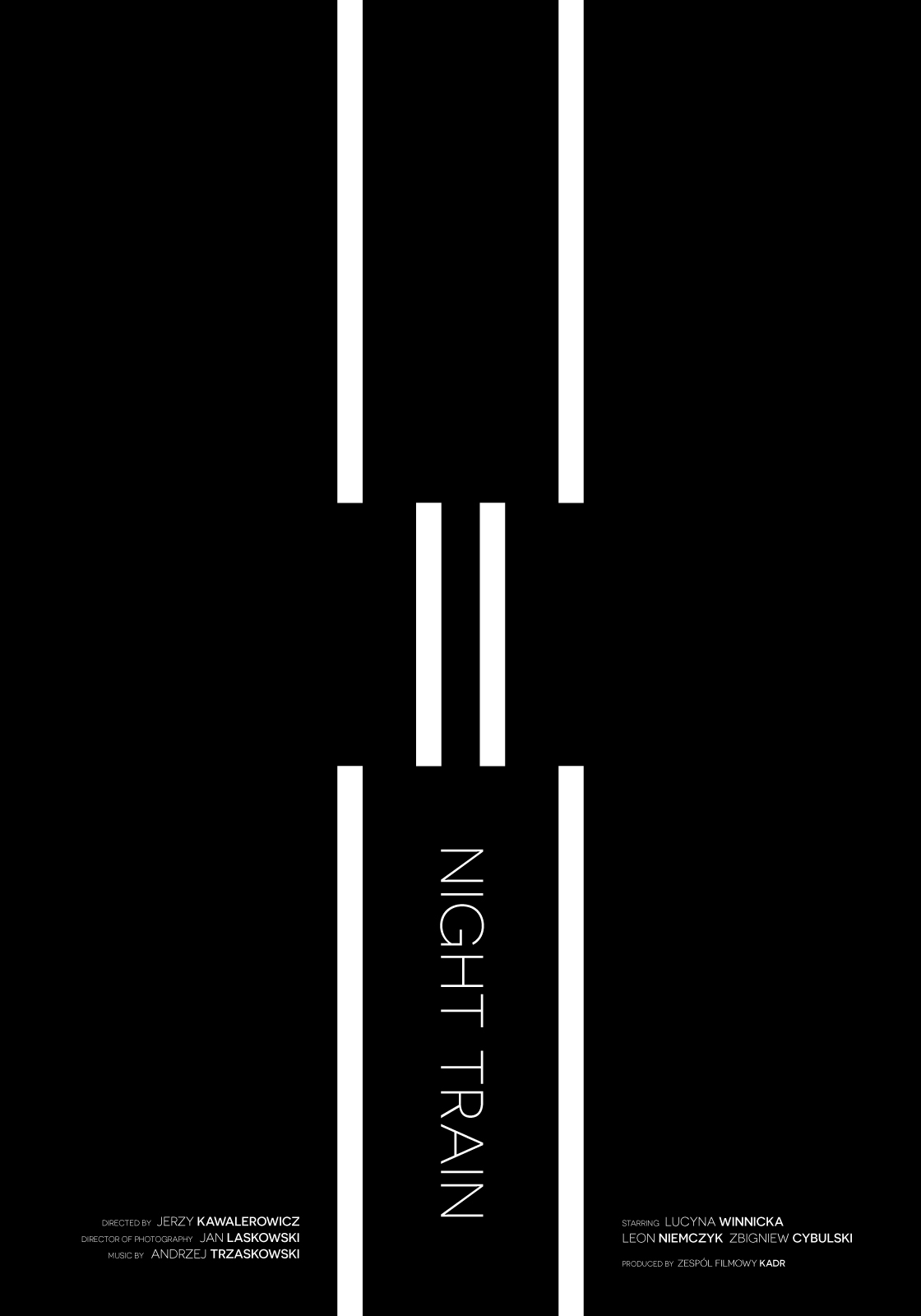
Night Train

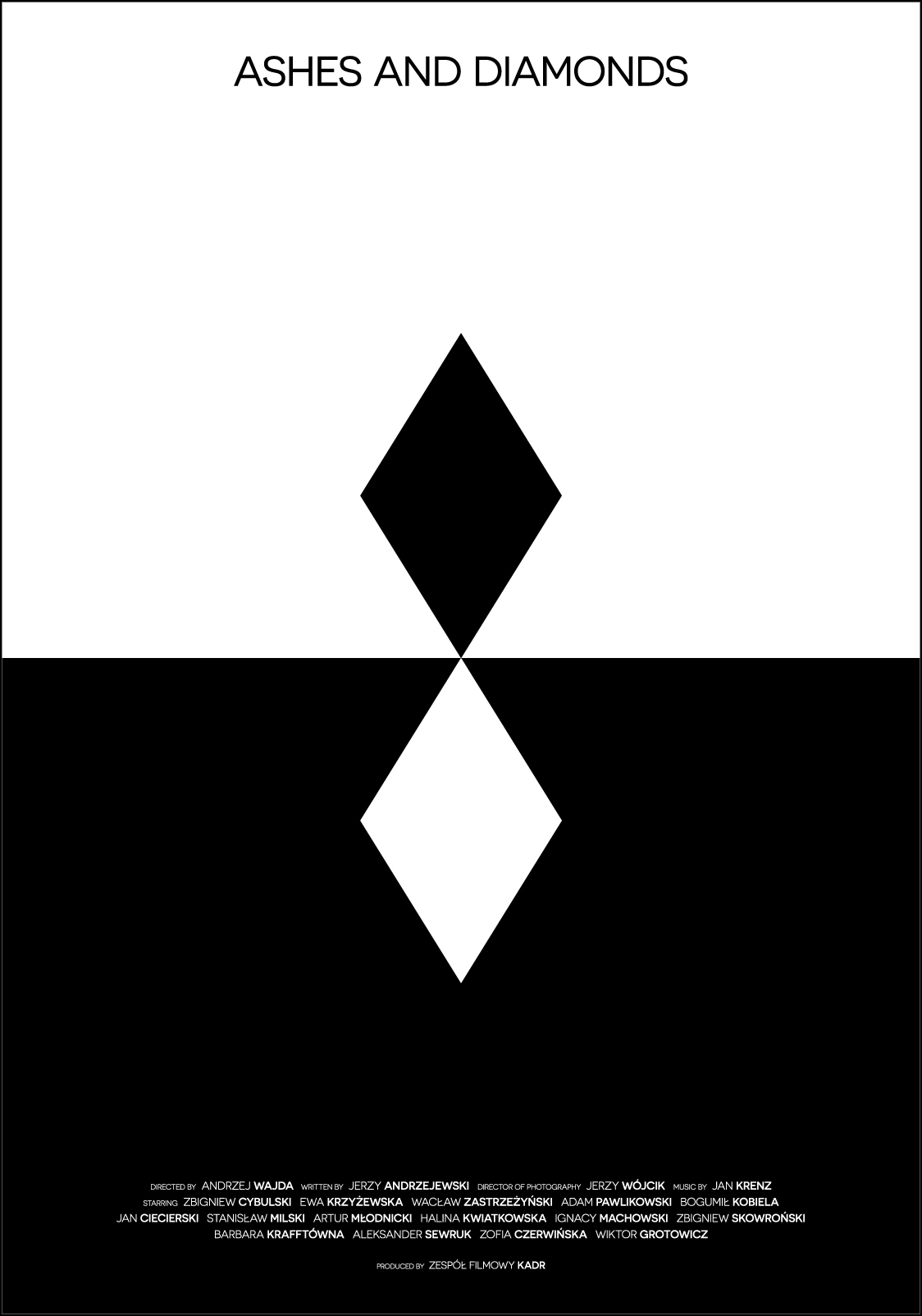
Ashes and Diamonds

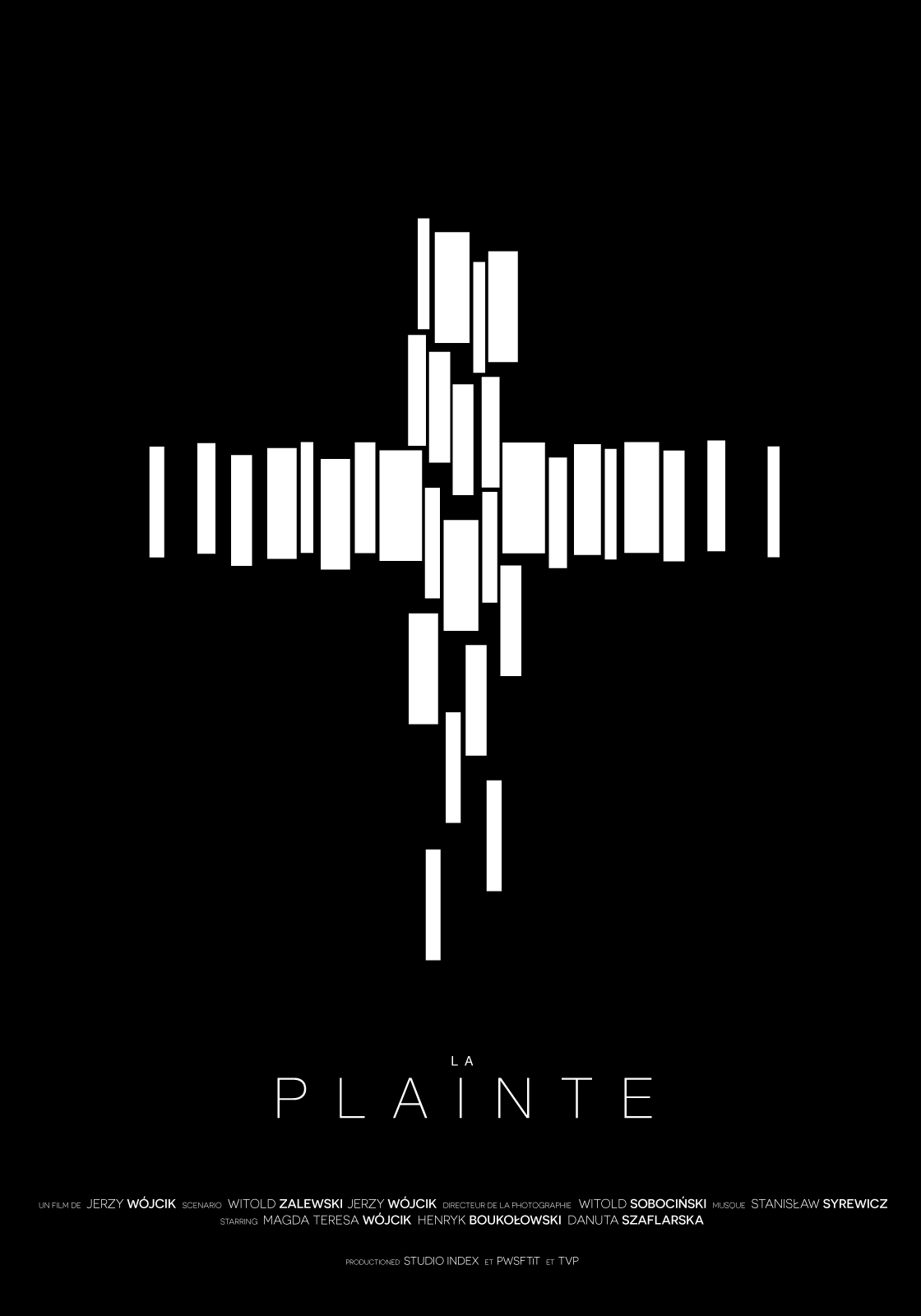
The Complaint

== Other posters ==
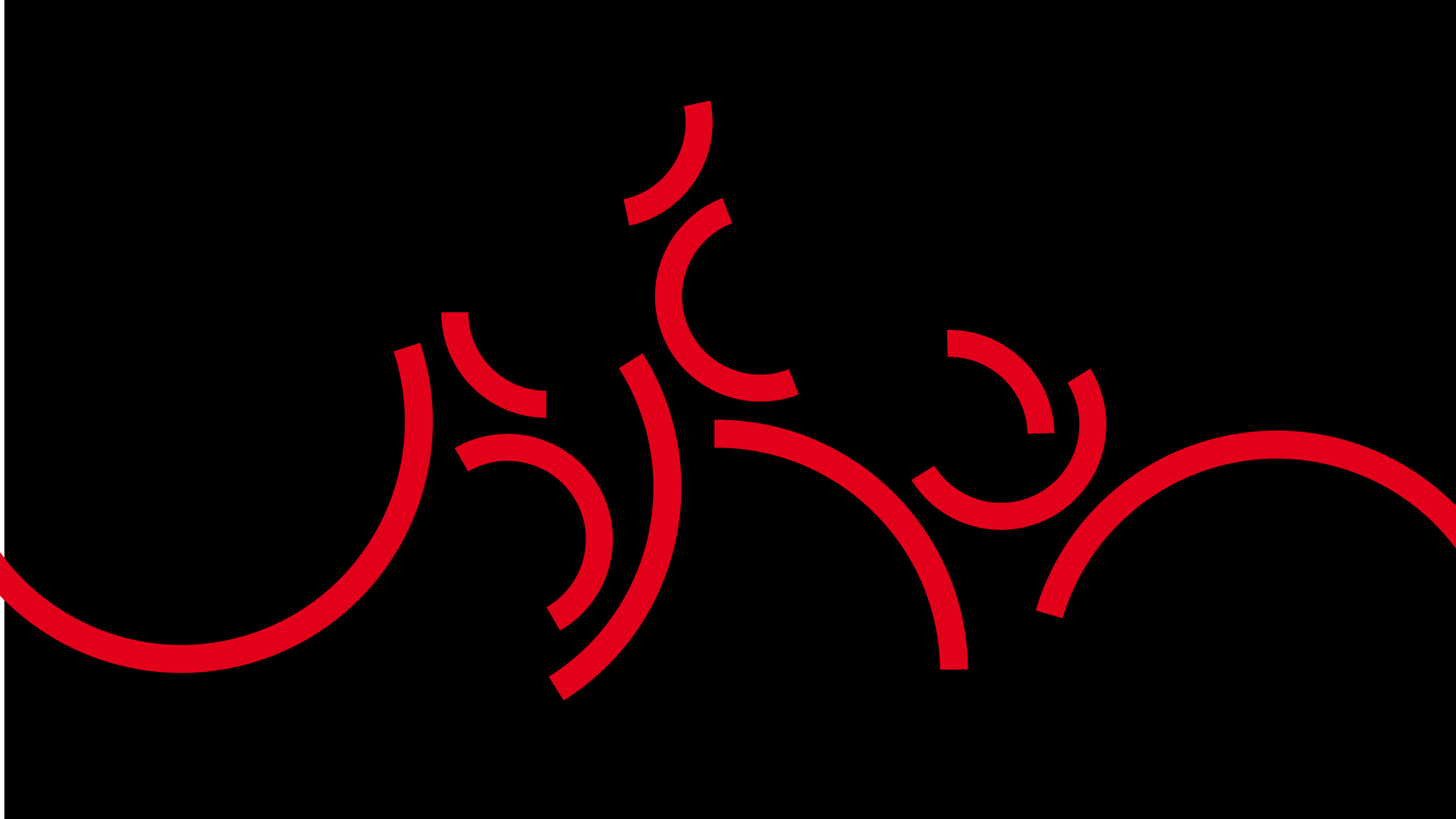
Bolero HD

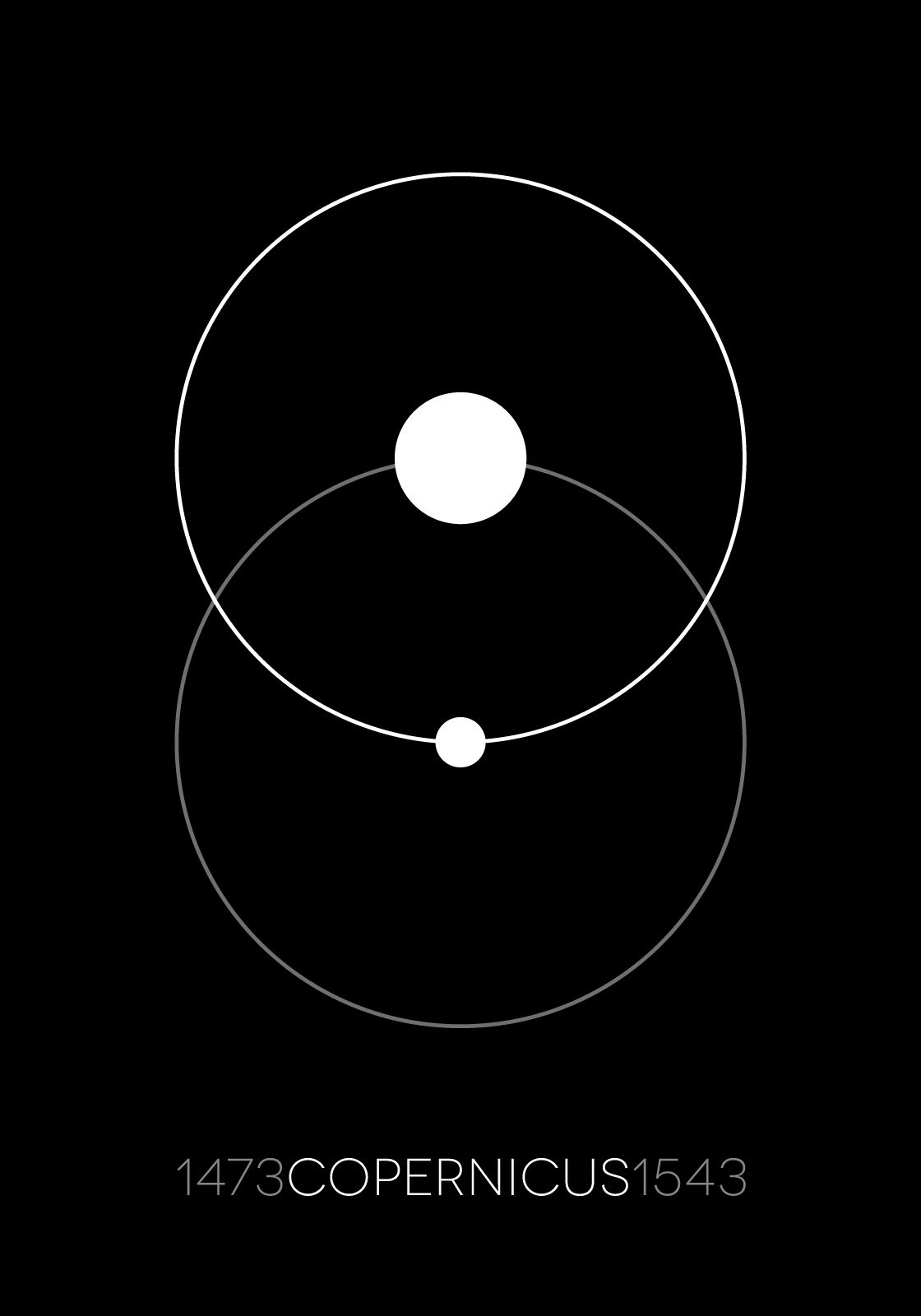
Copernicus

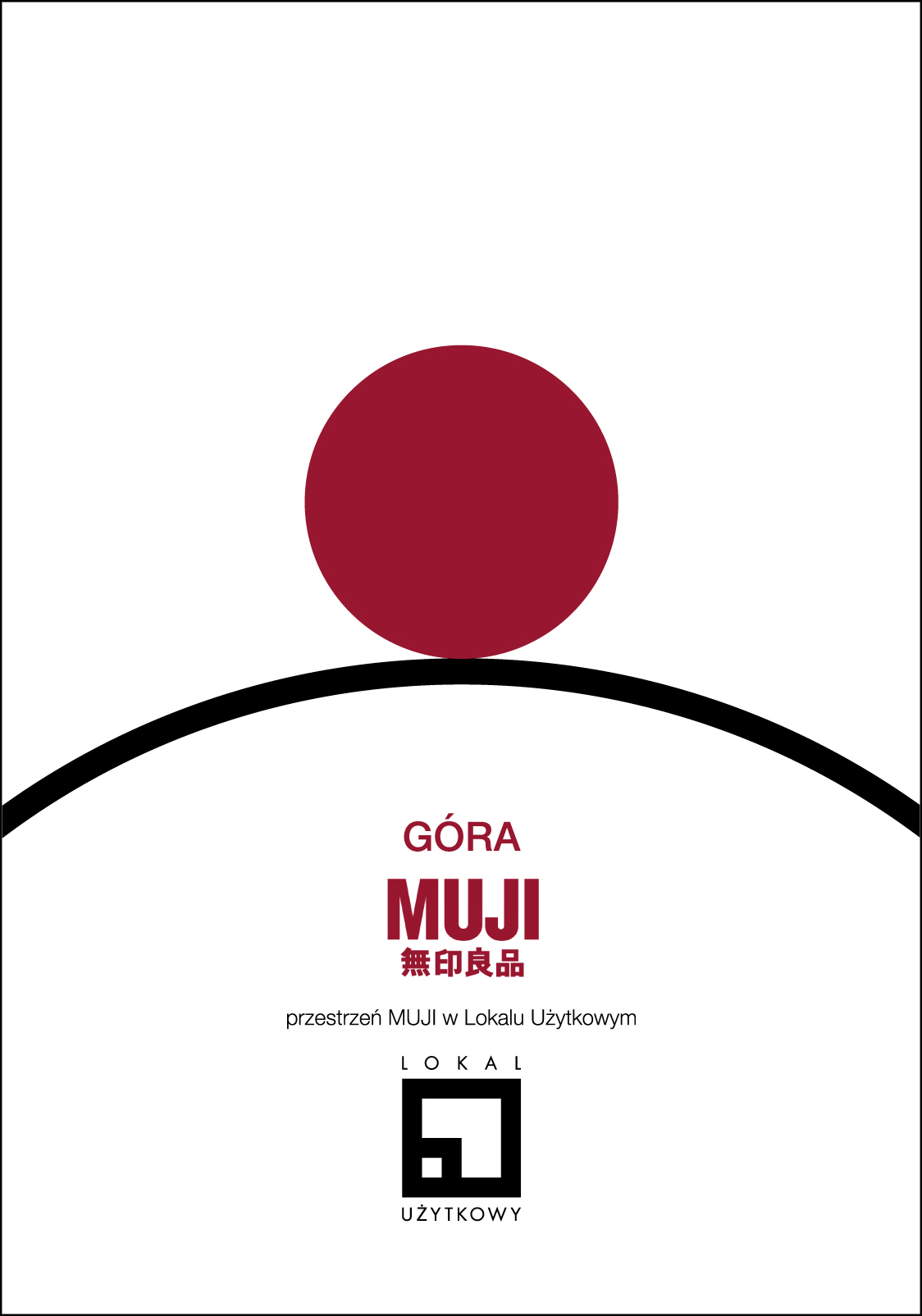
Mount Muji

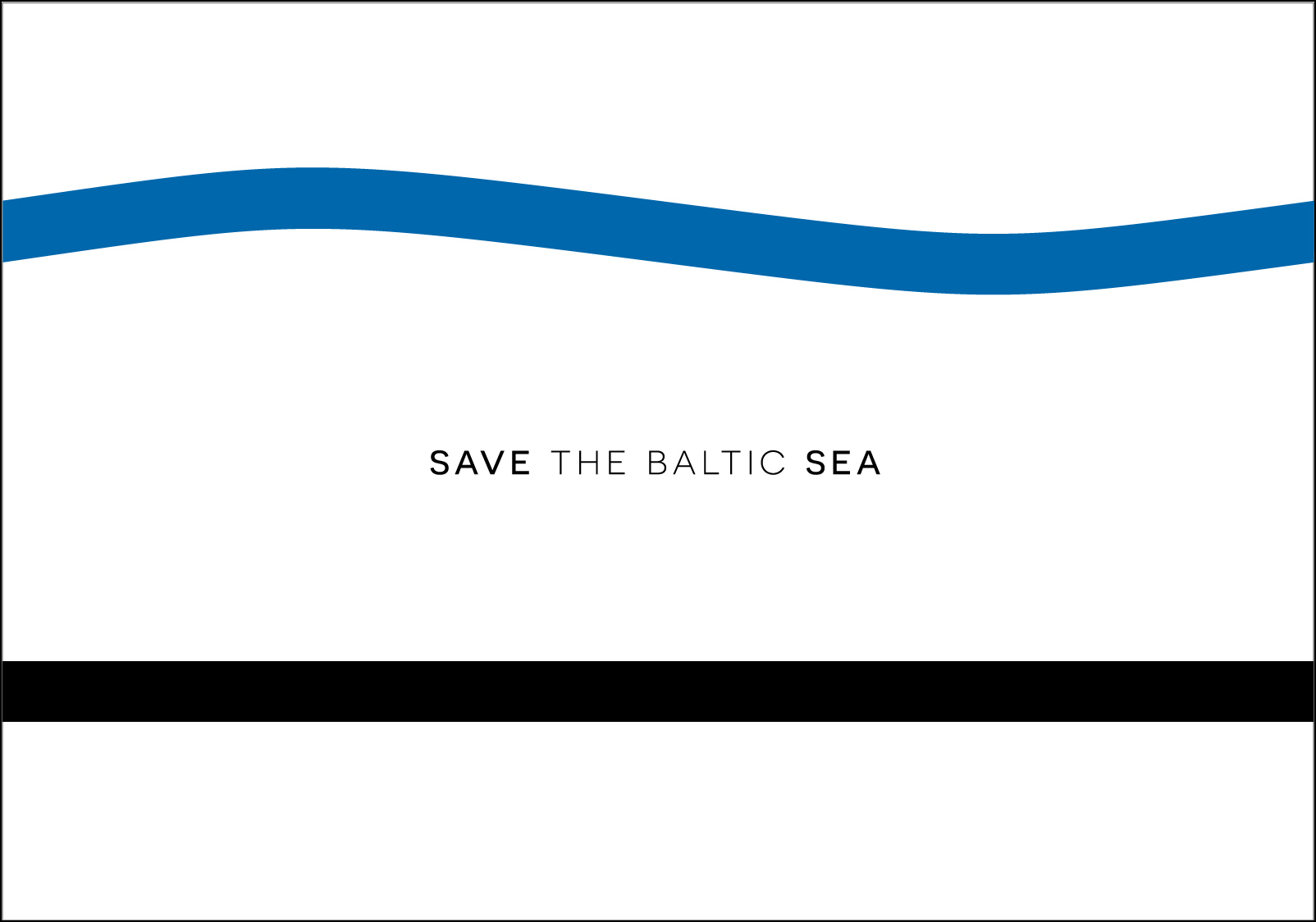
Save the Baltic sea

== Photographs ==
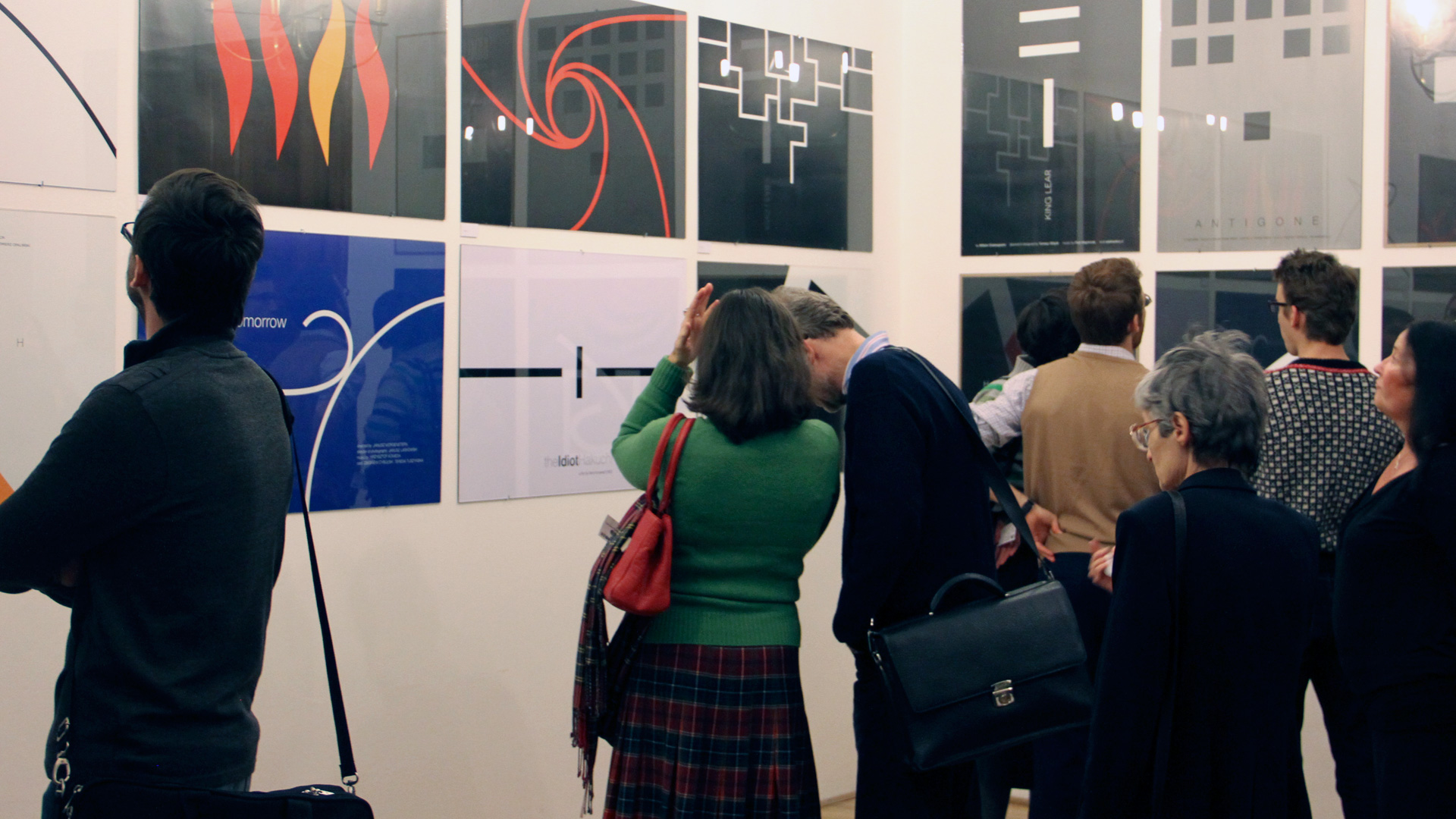
Budapest exhibition 2014

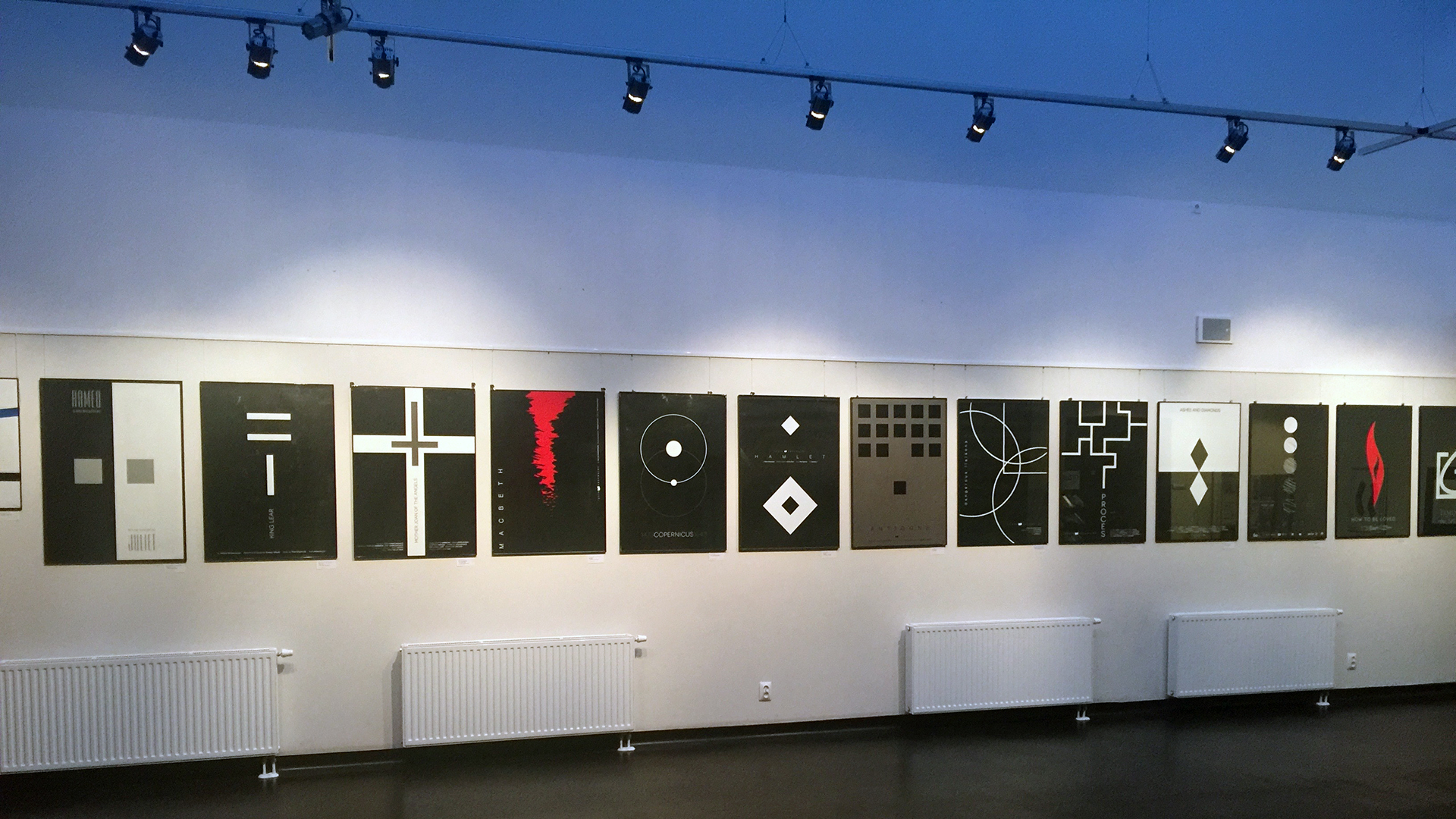
Suwałki exhibition 2016

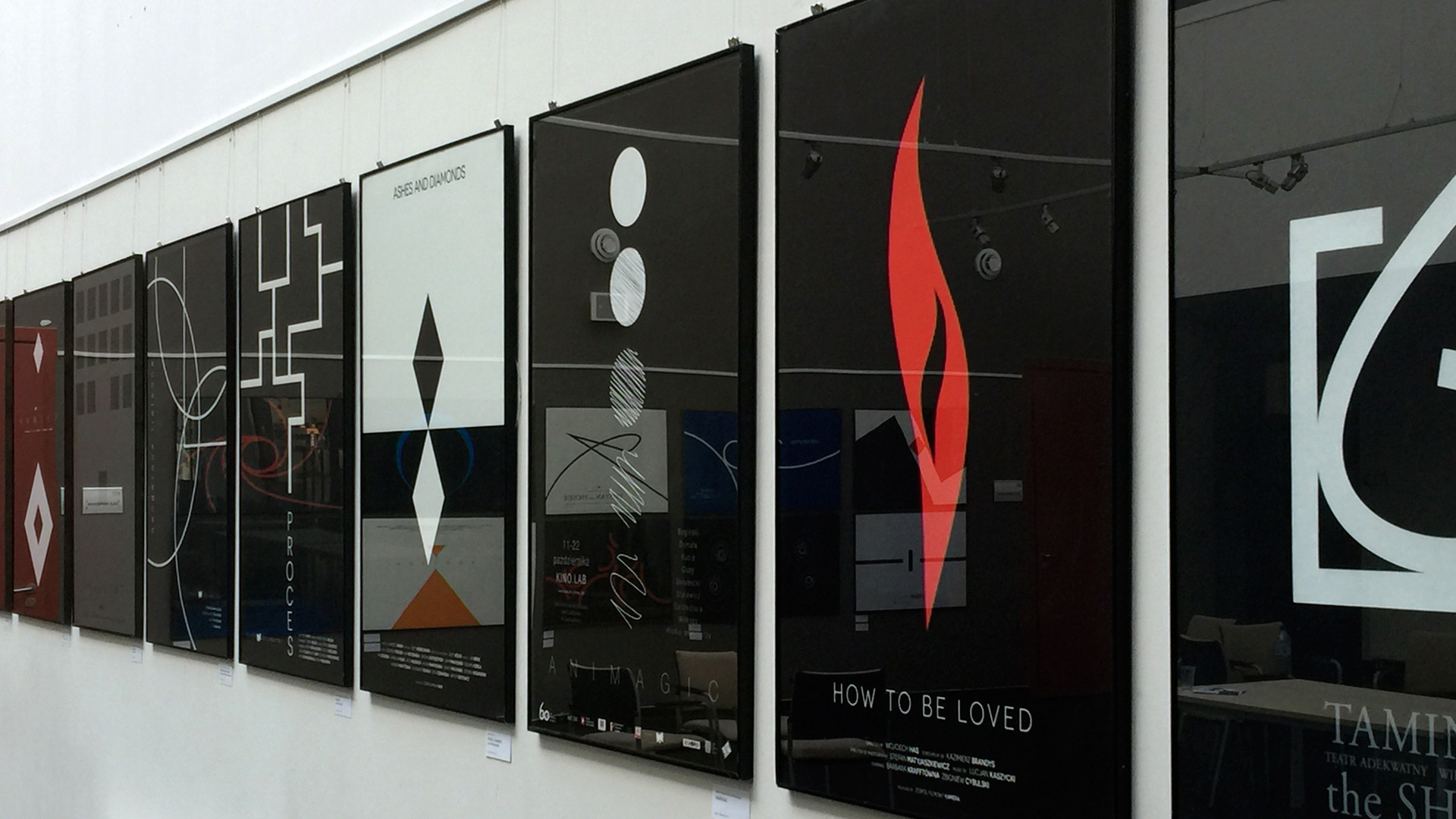
Suwałki exhibition 2016
