= Jerzy Andrzejewski =

Polish author (1909–1983)

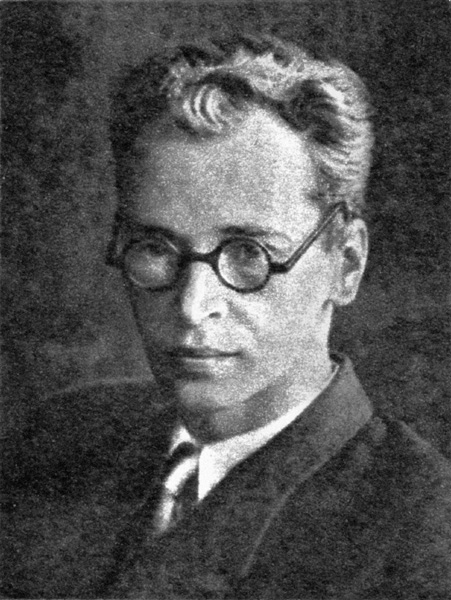
- Jerzy Andrzejewski in 1949
- Born: 19 August 1909; Warsaw, Vistula Land, Russian Empire
- Died: 19 April 1983 (aged 73); Warsaw, Poland
- Citizenship: Russian, Polish
- Known for: Ashes and Diamonds

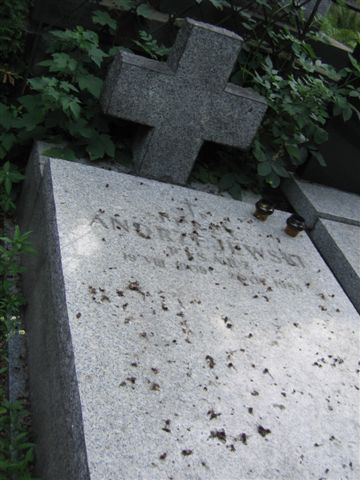
Grave of Jerzy Andrzejewski at Powązki Cemetery in Warsaw

Jerzy Andrzejewski (Polish pronunciation: [ˈjɛʐɨ andʐɛˈjɛfskʲi]; 19 August 1909 – 19 April 1983) was a prolific Polish writer. His works confront controversial moral issues such as betrayal, the Jews and Auschwitz in the wartime. His novels, Ashes and Diamonds (about the immediate post-war situation in Poland), and Holy Week (treating the Warsaw Ghetto Uprising), have been made into film adaptations by the Oscar-winning Polish director Andrzej Wajda. Holy Week and Ashes and Diamonds have both been translated into English. His novel The Gates of Paradise was translated into English by James Kirkup and published by Panther Books with the anglicised spelling "George Andrzeyevski".

== Life and career ==
Born in Warsaw in 1909, Andrzejewski studied philology at the University of Warsaw in the Second Polish Republic. In 1932 he debuted in ABC Magazine with his first short story entitled Wobec czyjegoś życia. In 1936 he published a full collection of short stories called Drogi nieuniknione, in Biblioteka Prosto z mostu, and soon received broad recognition for his new, Catholic-inspired novel Ład serca from 1938.

During World War II he was involved in efforts to aid the Jewish refugees. His short novel Holy Week (1945) has been described as "arguably the first literary attempt to examine the behavior of Poles facing the Holocaust".

Immediately after World War II, Andrzejewski published the volume Night (Noc, 1945) and his most famous novel so far, Ashes and Diamonds (Popiół i diament, 1948). Having joined the Polish United Workers' Party (PZPR) in 1950, he left the party after the 1956 Polish October protests and riots. After the suppression of the Prague Spring, in which Polish troops participated, Andrzejewski wrote a letter of apology to Eduard Goldstücker, the chairman of the Czechoslovak Writers Union. In 1964 he was one of the signatories of the so-called Letter of 34 to Prime Minister Józef Cyrankiewicz regarding freedom of culture. In 1976 Andrzejewski was one of the founding members of the intellectual opposition group KOR (Workers' Defence Committee). Later, Andrzejewski was a strong supporter of Poland's anti-Communist Solidarity movement.

Andrzejewski was gay.

Although he was frequently considered a front-runner for the Nobel Prize for Literature, he never received the honor. His purported alcoholism in his later years may have hindered his literary output, thus preventing him from ever becoming a true moral authority.

He died of a heart attack in Warsaw in 1983.

== Legacy ==
Andrzejewski's wartime writings, which inspired the Anti-Nazi Home Army, and in turn his post-war work as a propagandist for Stalinism in Poland are analyzed in Czesław Miłosz's The Captive Mind. In that book, Miłosz refers to Andrzejewski only as "Alpha." According to Miłosz, Andrzejewski's writing is "sainted and supercilious," and other poets and writers in postwar Poland considered him a "respectable prostitute."

On 23 September 2006, Jerzy Andrzejewski was posthumously awarded the Commander's Cross of the Order of Polonia Restituta by Polish President Lech Kaczyński.

== List of works ==
- Unavoidable Roads (Drogi nieuniknione, 1936), a collection of short stories
- Mode of the Heart (Ład serca, 1938), first novel, winner of the Polish Academy of Literature award
- Night (Noc, 1945) featuring Holy Week
- Ashes and Diamonds (Popiół i diament, 1948), film version won Critics' Prize at 1959 Venice Film Festival
- The Inquisitors (Ciemności kryją ziemię, 1957, tr. 1960)
- An Effective War (Wojna skuteczna, czyli Opis bitew i potyczek z Zadufkami, 1953), stalinist feel-good story
- The Gates of Paradise (Bramy raju, 1960), novel notable for being written almost without punctuation, in two sentences
- A Sitter for a Satyr (Idzie skacząc po górach, 1963) published in the United Kingdom as He Cometh Leaping upon the Mountain

(and others)
