= Statue of Halina Mikołajska =

Monument in Warsaw, Poland

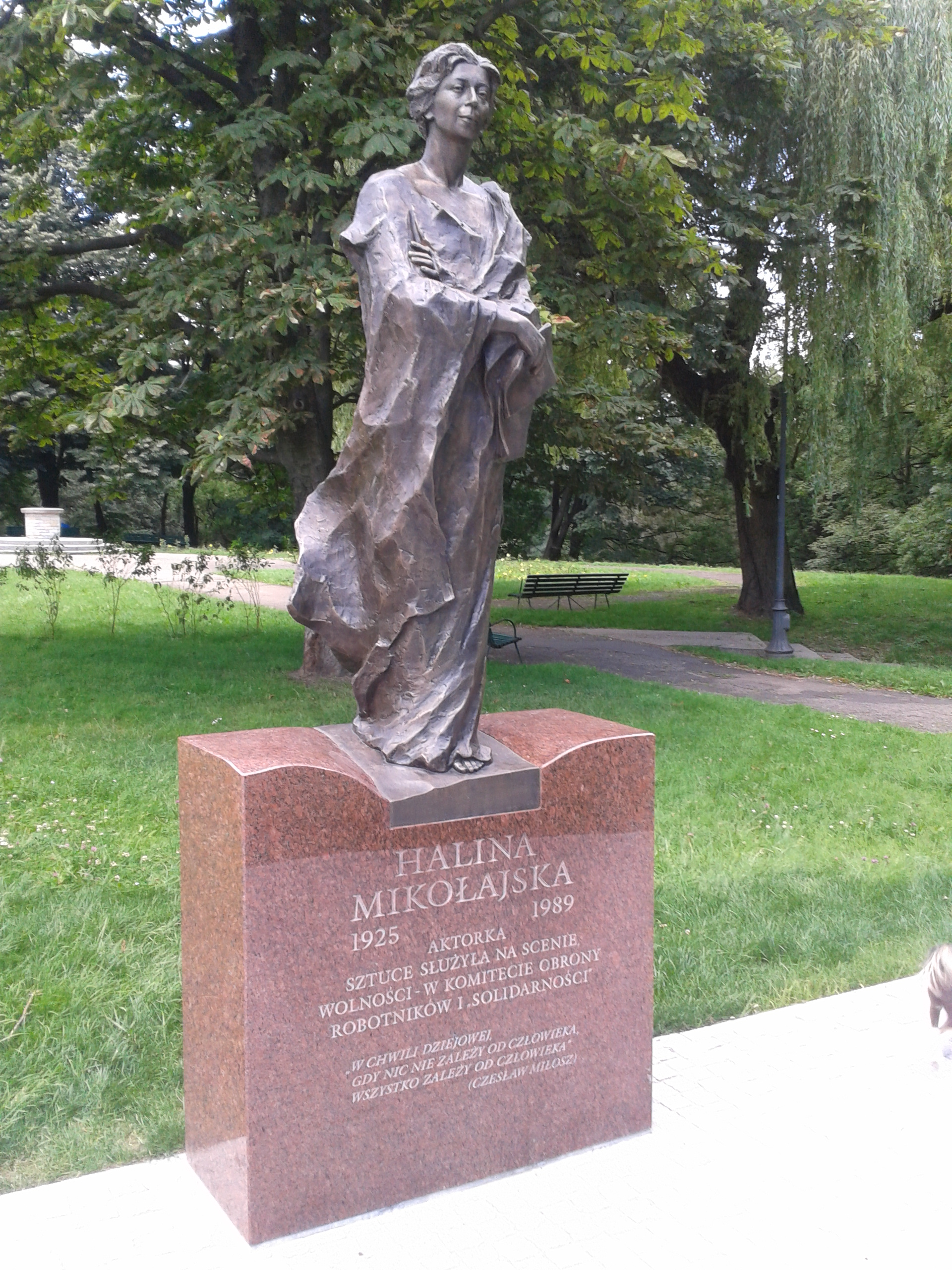
- The monument in 2012.
- Interactive map of Statue of Halina Mikołajska
- Location: Marshal Edward Rydz-Śmigły Park, Warsaw, Poland
- Coordinates: 52°13′35.12″N 21°01′49.24″E
- Designer: Krystyna Fałdyga-Solska
- Type: Statue
- Material: Bronze
- Completion date: 4 June 2012
- Dedicated to: Halina Mikołajska

The statue of Halina Mikołajska (Polish pronunciation: [xaˈli.na mi.kɔˈwaj.ska]; Polish: Pomnik Haliny Mikołajskiej) is a monument in Warsaw, Poland, in the Downtown district, located in the Marshal Edward Rydz-Śmigły Park near the building of the Senate of Poland. It consists of a bronze statue of Halina Mikołajska (1925–1989), actress and activist of the pro-democratic movement in the Polish People's Republic. The monument was designed by Krystyna Fałdyga-Solska, and unveiled on 4 June 2012.

== History ==
The moment was designed by sculptor Krystyna Fałdyga-Solska. It was dedicated to Halina Mikołajska (1925–1989), actress and activist of the pro-democratic movement in the Polish People's Republic. She was one of the signatories of the Letter of 59, and the member of the Workers' Defence Committee, and the KOR Committee for Social Self-Defense.

The monument was unveiled on 4 June 2012, in the 23rd anniversary of the 1989 Polish parliamentary election. The ceremony was held by Bronisław Komorowski, President of Poland, and Danuta Szaflarska, actress and veteran of the Warsaw Uprising. It was also attended, among others, by Tadeusz Mazowiecki, former Prime Minister or Poland, Bogdan Borusewicz, Marshal of the Senate, Hanna Gronkiewicz-Waltz, mayor of Warsaw, and Władysław Bartoszewski, chairperson of the Council for the Protection of Struggle and Martyrdom Sites. There was also read a letter written by Donald Tusk, Prime Minister of Poland.

== Characteristics ==
The monument is located in the Marshal Edward Rydz-Śmigły Park near the building of the Senate of Poland. It consists of a bronze statue of Halina Mikołajska in a dress flowing in the wind, and holding a pile of papers in her left hand. It is placed on a pedestal, with an inscription as transcribed below.

Polish inscription

Halina Mikołajska
1925 1989

Aktorka
sztuce służyła na scenie
wolności – w Komitecie Obrony
Robotników i „Solidarności”

„W chwili dziejowej,
gdy nic nie zależy od człowieka,
wszystko zależy od człowieka”
(Czesław Miłosz)

Translation:
English translation

Halina Mikołajska
1925 1989

An actress
who served the arts on the stage of freedom,
in the Workers' Defence Committee
and "Solidarity"

"At this historic moment,
when nothing depends on man,
everything depends on man"
(Czesław Miłosz)
