= Halina Mikołajska =

Polish actress (1925–1989)

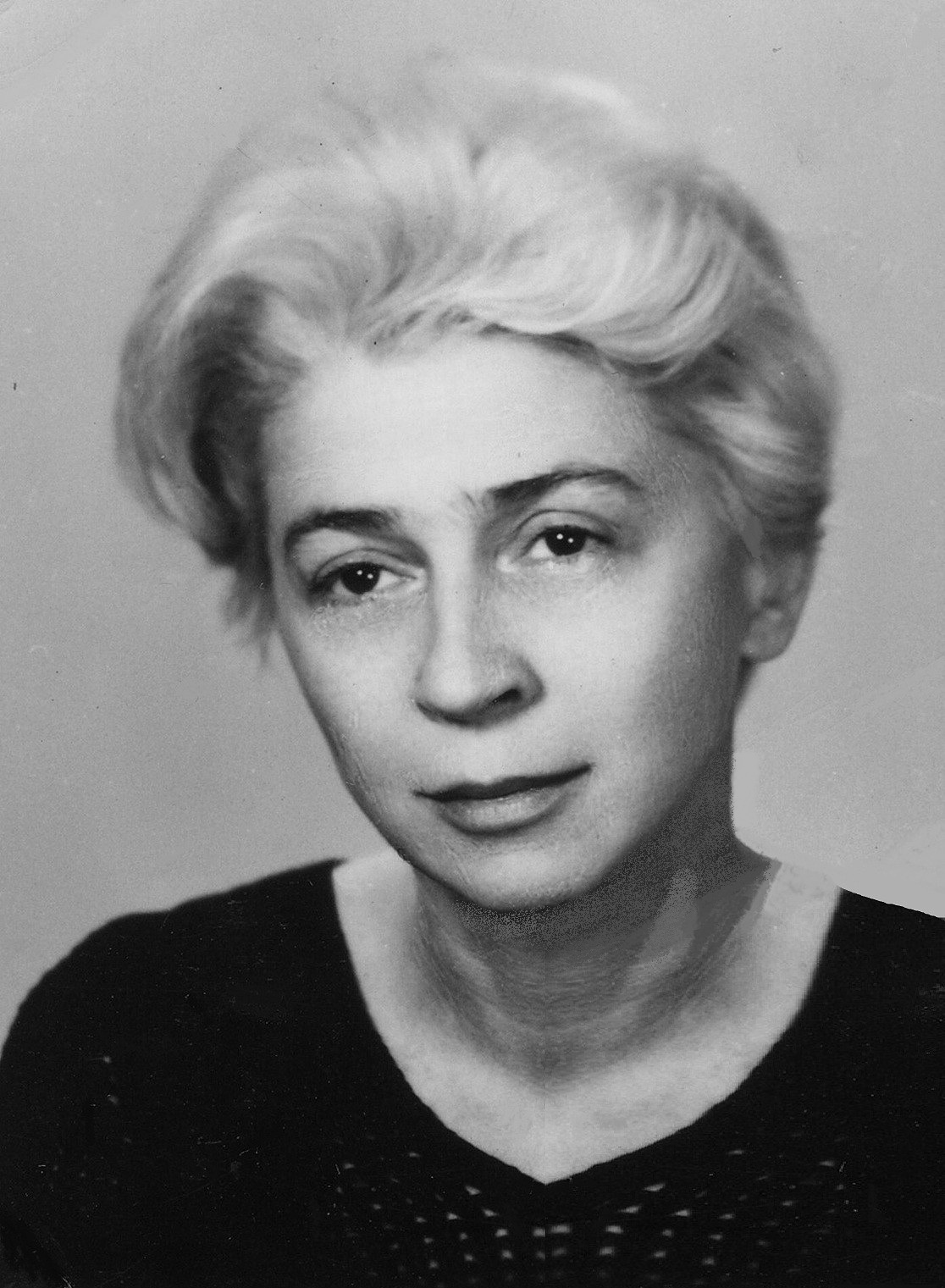
- Mikołajska in 1965
- Born: 22 March 1925; Kraków, Poland
- Died: 22 June 1989 (aged 64); Warsaw, Poland
- Education: National Academy of Theatre Arts
- Occupations: Actress, director
- Years active: 1946–1983

Halina Mikołajska-Brandys (Note: Polish pronunciation: [xaˈli.na mi.kɔˈwaj.ska ˈbran.dɘ̟s]) (22 March 1925 – 22 June 1989; Polish: [mi.kɔˈwaj.ska]) was a Polish actress, director, and pro-democracy activist.

== Biography ==
Halina Mikołajska was born on 22 March 1925 in Kraków, Poland.

During the Second World War, while under the German occupation, she performed in the Adam Mularczyk's underground theatre in Kraków. After the conflict, Mikołajska studied chemistry at the Jagiellonian University from 1945 to 1946, as well as acting at the National Academy of Theatre Arts, which she graduated in 1947. She performed in the National Dramatic Theatres in Kraków from 1946 to 1949, the Dramatic Theatres in Wrocław until 1950, as well as numerous theatres in Warsaw, including the Polish Theatre from 1950 to 1954 and 1982 to 1983, the Contemporary Theatre from 1955 to 1962 and 1967 to 1980, and the National Theatre from 1962 to 1966. Mikołajska also performed in numerous feature films, including Adventure in Marienstadt (1953), Nobody's Calling (1960), Another Shore (1962), Family Life (1971), Awards and Decorations (1973), A Woman's Decision (1975), Camouflage (1977), and Postcard from the Journey (1984), as well as in numerous radio shows.

From 1953 to 1962, Mikołajska was taught acting at the Aleksander Zelwerowicz National Academy of Dramatic Art in Warsaw.

In the 1970s, she began being active in the dissident movement opposing the communist authoritarian government of the Polish People's Republic. In 1975, Mikołajska was one of the signatories of the Letter of 59, protesting against the changes of the state constitution. In 1976 she joined the Workers' Defence Committee, and in 1977, the KOR Committee for Social Self-Defense. In January 1978, she was one of the signatories of the founding declaration of the Society for Academic Courses. Mikołajska was repeatedly harassed by the Security Service, and, beginning in 1976, she was blacklisted from performing in film, television, radio, and later, also in theatre. In 1976, she has survived a suicidal attempt.

During the period of the martial law in Poland, she was placed in the internment camps in Darłówko, Gołdap, and Jaworze between 1981 and 1982.

On 4 June 1989, shortly prior to her death, Mikołajska voted in the first partially free parliamentary election in the country. She died on 22 June 1989 in Warsaw, and was buried in the nearby village of Laski.

== Private life ==
She was married to architect Janusz Ballenstedt from 1944 to 1948, and to painter Aleksander Stefanowski, whom she also divorced. In 1955, she married writer Marian Brandys. She was an aunt of singer and songwriter Antonina Krzysztoń.

== Commemorations ==
On 4 June 2012, in the Marshal Edward Rydz-Śmigły Park in Warsaw, near the senate building, was unveiled a monument dedicated to her, designed by Krystyna Fałdyga-Solska.

== Filmography ==
Year	Title	Role	Notes
1954	Adventure in Marienstadt	Bricklayer	Feature film; uncredited
1955	Wesele	Rachela	Television play
1956	Było 10 murzynów		Television play
1956	Lato		Television play
1958	Eroica		Feature film; uncredited
1959	Freuda teoria snów	Her	Television play
1959	Powiem wam kto zabił	Sara Drummond	Television play
1960	Mizantrop		Television play
1960	Nobody's Calling	Olga Stareńska	Feature film
1960	Podróż do zielonych cieni		Television play
1960	Troja, miasto otwarte	Beata	Television play
1961	Arlekinada	Edna	Television play
1961	Lata nauki Wilhelma Meistra	Aurelia	Television play
1961	Makowskie bajki		Television play
1961	Noc tysiączna druga	Lady Claudia	Television play
1961	Zapis	Countess	Television play
1962	Another Shore	Woman with a child	Feature film
1962	Dwa teatry		Television play
1962	Homer I Orchidea		Television play
1962	Jestem dorosły		Television play
1963	By the Railway Track	Jewish woman	Short film
1963	Prometeusz w okowach	Io	Television play
1963	Aktorki. Parias	Mrs. X	Television play
1964	Tonio Kruger	Lizaweta	Television play
1964	Lubow Jarowaja		Television play
1964	Zapiski majora Pycia	Hanna Drwęska	Television play
1964	Śmierć gubernatora	Anna Maria	Television play
1964	Księga Hioba	Mary Herup	Television play
1964	Drzwi muszą być albo otwarte albo zamknięte	Markiza	Television play
1964	Adwokat i róże	Dorota	Television play
1966	Oczekiwanie	Freda	Television play
1966	Żeglarz	Doktorowa	Television play
1967	O długim czekaniu		Television play
1967	Listy panny de Lespinasse		Television play
1967	Krzyk w próżni świata	Dr. Renata W.	Television play
1967	Fedra	Fedra	Television play
1969	Niemcy	Liesel	Television play
1970	W małym dworku	Anastazja Nibek	Television play
1970	Duża sala		Television play
1970	Cudzoziemka	Róża	Television play
1970	Andromacha	Tetyda	Television play
1971	Bogumił I Barbara	Narrator	Television play
1971	Family Life	Jadwiga	Feature film
1971	Lalka z łóżka nr 21	Wilma Jelinek	Television play
1972	Dama Pikowa	Anna Fiedotown	Television play
1972	Lato w Nohant	George Sand	Television play
1973	Awards and Decorations	National Armed Forces employee	Feature film
1973	Krystyna I Erland	Lady Aashild	Television play
1974	Niemcy	Berta	Television play
1975	A Woman's Decision	Róża	Feature film
1975	Żywa maska	Margravine	Television play
1975	Zagrożenie	Zofia	Television play
1975	Rok Polski		Television play
1976	Camouflage	Actress reading poems	Feature film
1981	Molier, czyli perfidna zmowa świętoszków	Magdalena Bejart	Television play
1983	Postcard from the Journey	Grandmother Grossmanowa	Feature film
2009	Revisited	Jadwiga	Feature film; archival footage

== Decorations ==
- Knight's Cross of the Order of Polonia Restituta (1954)
- Officer's Cross of the Order of Polonia Restituta (1963)
- Badge of the 1000th Anniversary of the Polish State (1967)
- Commander's Cross of the Order of Polonia Restituta (2006; posthumously)

== Awards ==
- 1951: 2nd-degree State Award for the role of Anna in Stefan Żeromski's play Grzech, directed by Bohdan Korzeniewski in Polish Theatre in Warsaw;
- 1955: 2nd-degree State Award for the role of Ethel in Leon Kruczkowski's play Juliusz i Ethel, directed by Aleksander Bardini in Polish Theatre in Warsaw;
- 1958: Polish Radio and Television Committee Award for the role of Warwara in audioplay Biedni ludzie, based on Fyodor Dostoevsky script;
- 1970: distinction by magazine Kobieta i życie;
- 1971: Golden Screen (Złoty Ekran) for the best women's performance for the role of Tetyda in the television play Andromacha, directed by Jan Maciejowski;
- 1971: Golden Screen (Złoty Ekran) for the best women's performance for the role of Róża in Cudzoziemce, directed by Jan Kulczyński;
- 1971: Golden Screen (Złoty Ekran) for the best women's performance in Duża sala, directed by Aleksander Bardini;
- 1971: Golden Screen (Złoty Ekran) for the best women's performance for the role of Anastazja in W małym dworku directed by Zygmunt Hübner;
- 1971: Polish Radio and Television Committee Award for the overall performance of the year 1970 in the Polish Television plays;
