= Nikt nie woła =

1960 Polish narrative film

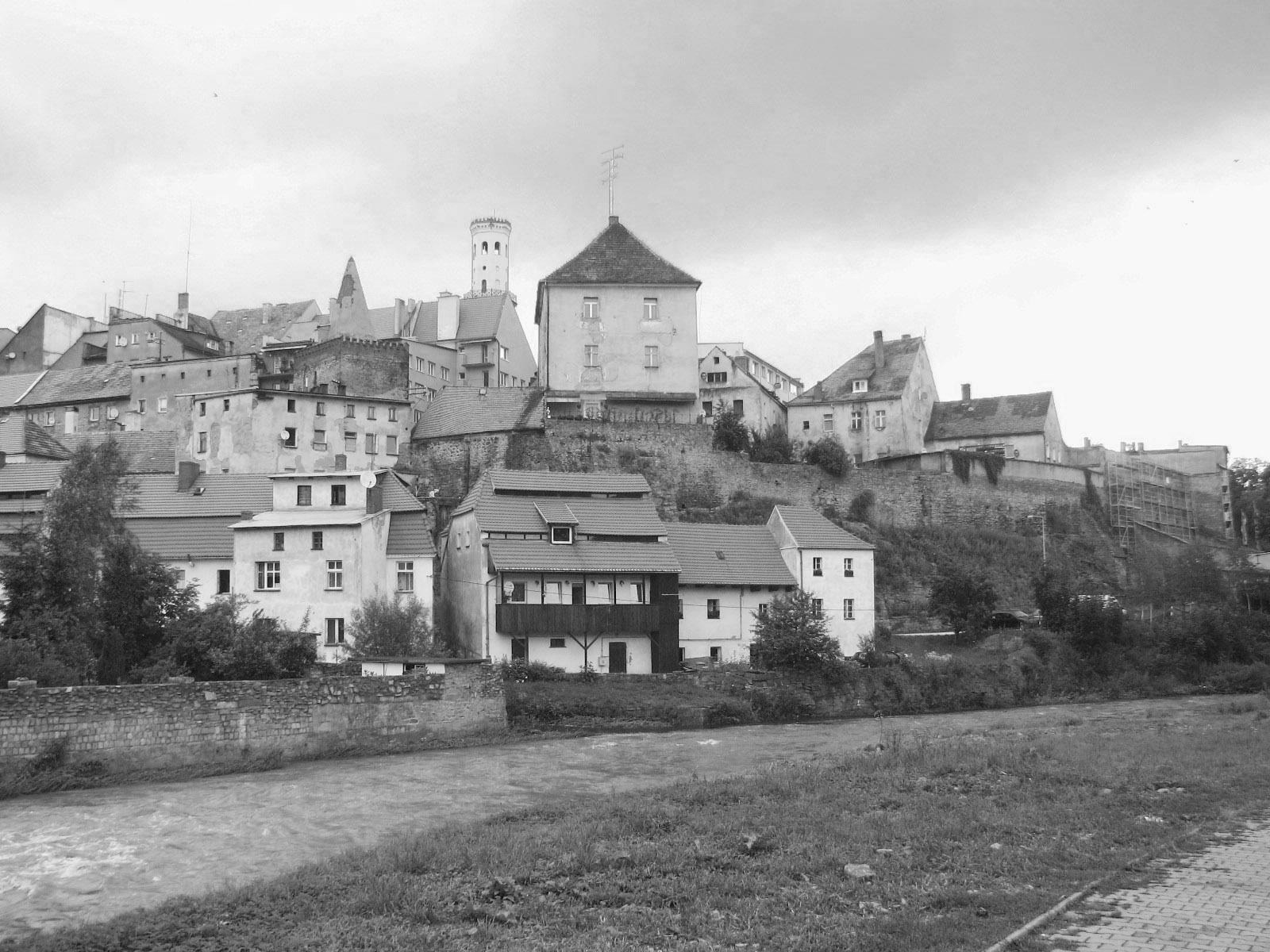
- Bystrzyca Kłodzka – the setting of the film
- Directed by: Kazimierz Kutz
- Written by: Józef Hen
- Starring: Henryk Boukołowski; Zofia Marcinkowska; Barbara Krafftówna; Halina Mikołajska
- Cinematography: Jerzy Wójcik
- Edited by: Irena Choryńska
- Music by: Wojciech Kilar
- Production company: KADR
- Release date: 31 October 1960 (Poland)
- Running time: 86 minutes
- Country: Poland
- Language: Polish

Nikt nie woła (Nobody's Calling) is a Polish black-and-white narrative film from 1960, directed by Kazimierz Kutz, loosely based on the novel of the same title by Józef Hen. The film tells the post-war story of a deserter from the anti-communist underground (played by Henryk Boukołowski) who tries to settle in a former German town and becomes infatuated with one of the local women (played by Zofia Marcinkowska).

While making significant changes to Hen's novel, Kutz, together with cinematographer Jerzy Wójcik, also experimented with form, giving the film a painterly, artistic quality. Initially dismissed by critics, Nikt nie woła later gained recognition as one of Kutz's most important works, and it was seen as a creative dialogue with Andrzej Wajda's film Ashes and Diamonds (1958). At times, Nikt nie woła was compared to the films of Michelangelo Antonioni, with some critics noting the film's pioneering qualities, anticipating the Italian director's work.

== Plot ==
Shortly after World War II, repatriates and people seeking to escape their past arrive in a town on the Recovered Territories. Bożek, a young man, belongs to the latter group, burdened by a secret. Once a fighter, he no longer wants to kill. He is searching for a place for himself in the new post-war reality while trying to erase the traces of his past. Bożek disobeyed an order from the underground organization he was a part of, effectively signing his own death sentence because the order conflicted with his sense of justice – as he says himself, "I didn’t kill a Red" – and fled from Warsaw to a former German town, now called Zielna. He arrives on the roof of an overcrowded train, with only a suit, coat, and backpack. He takes over an old house by the river, sets up a room, and begins working at a winery. A young woman named Lucyna also arrives from the east, and Bożek becomes infatuated with her. However, in the meantime, he tries to form closer relationships with Olga, the factory supervisor where he works, and Niura, a sentimental repatriate from beyond the Bug river. By chance, Bożek discovers that another member of the underground organization, Zygmunt, has also come to the town. Eventually, Bożek returns to Lucyna, and they share a moment of physical intimacy. Knowing that the underground organization is now tracking him, Bożek leaves the town by train. However, before leaving, he promises Lucyna that he will return once it’s safe.

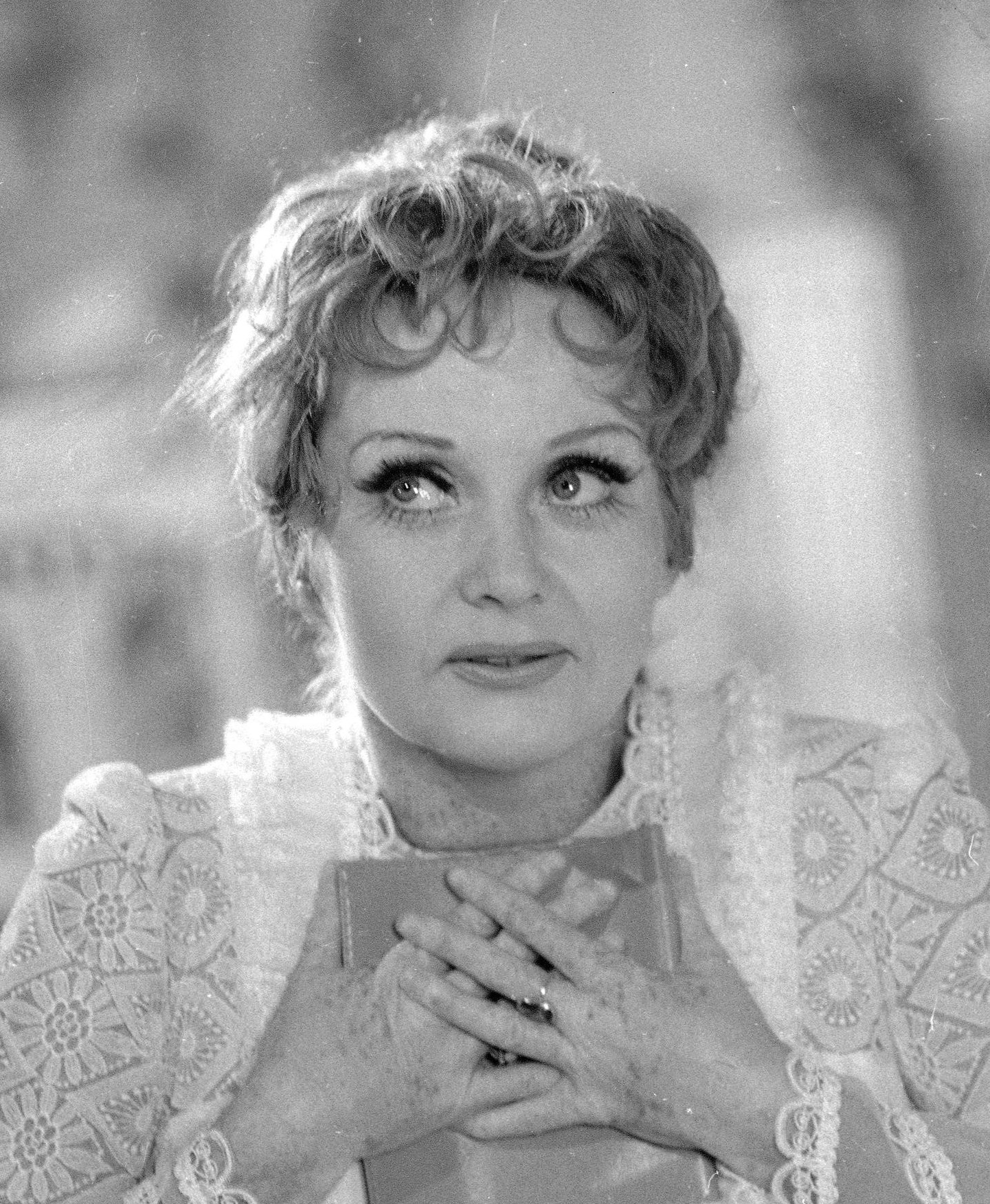
Barbara Krafftówna who played the role of Niura

== Cast ==
- Henryk Boukołowski as Bożek "Bohdan Nieczuja"
- Zofia Marcinkowska as Lucyna
- Laura Dębicka as Alicja, Lucyna's younger sister
- Barbara Krafftówna as Niura
- Irena Jaglarzowa as Niura's mother
- Andrzej Zamięcki as Stefek, Niura's son
- Halina Mikołajska as Olga Stareńska, the supervisor
- Aleksander Fogiel as the vagabond "Mayor"
- Ryszard Pietruski as Zygmunt

== Production ==
=== Screenplay ===
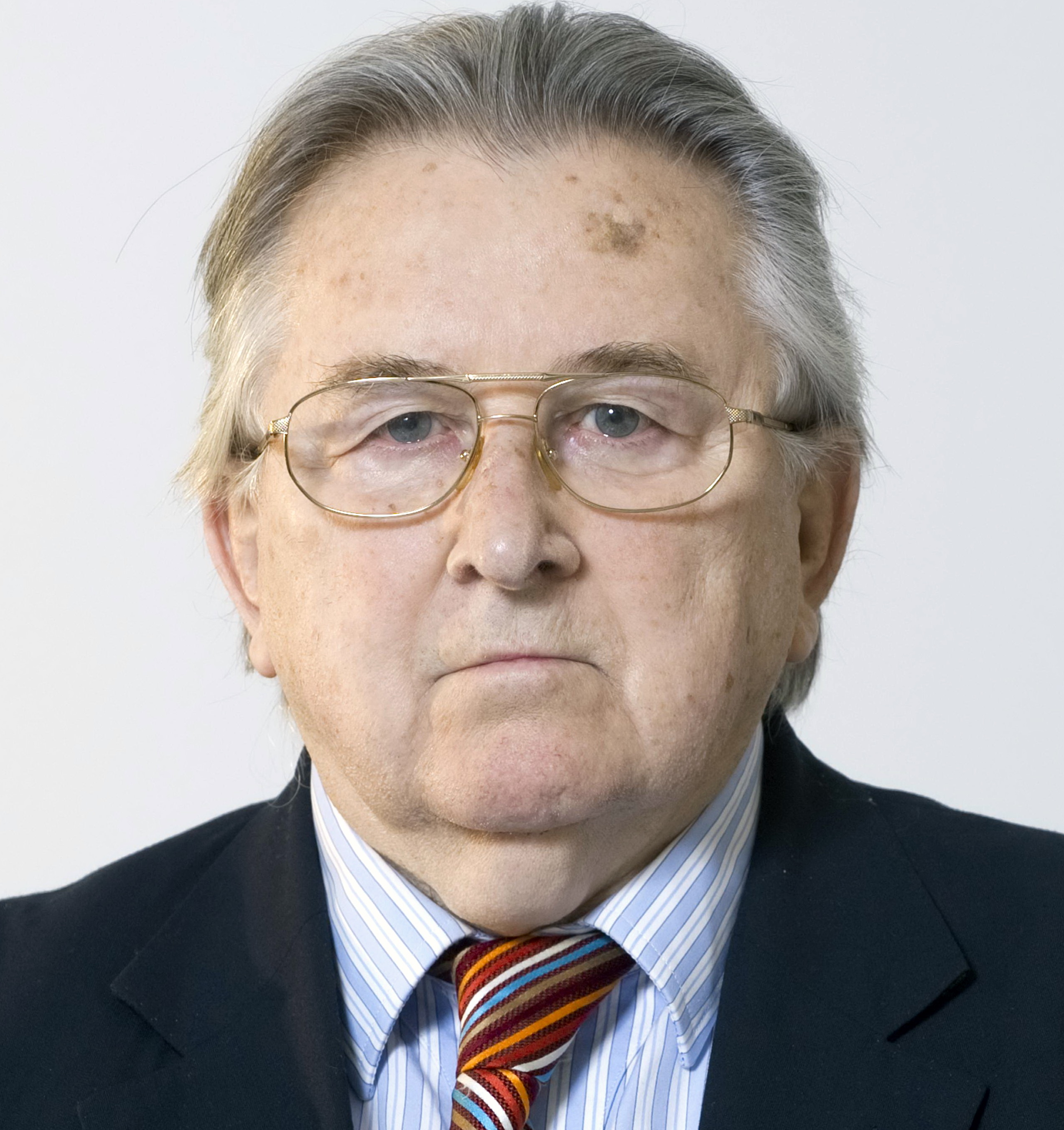
Kazimierz Kutz, director of the film (2011)

Nikt nie woła was created at the KADR studio under the literary direction of Tadeusz Konwicki. Director Kazimierz Kutz, who had previously achieved success with his film debut Krzyż Walecznych (Cross of the Brave, 1959), based the screenplay on the unpublished novel by Józef Hen titled Nikt nie woła za oknem (Nobody's Calling Outside), which was set in wartime Uzbekistan. Due to censorship concerns, Hen and Konwicki relocated the screenplay's setting to a post-war town in the Recovered Territories. They believed that this change would make it easier for the film to be accepted by the head of Polish cinematography, Tadeusz Zaorski, who was eager for a film about the Recovered Territories. On 7 April 1959, amid divided opinions, the Script Evaluation Commission approved the film for production, contingent upon the protagonist adopting a "more correct" ideological stance than Maciek Chełmicki from Ashes and Diamonds (1958) by Andrzej Wajda.

=== Cinematography ===
The filming location for the movie was Bystrzyca Kłodzka, an unrenovated Hussite town filled with ruined buildings and peeling walls. The choice of this setting significantly influenced the film's aesthetic. As Stanisław Ozimek noted, Kutz employed an almost ascetic restraint in his interiors, using only a few props that served a specific purpose, in contrast to Andrzej Wajda, Wojciech Has, or Stanisław Lenartowicz. Jerzy Wójcik, responsible for the cinematography of Nikt nie woła, justified the film's aesthetic as follows:

Man and objects are subjected to the action of time. It is essential to observe how these changes occur, how a person changes, his character, or his stance on various matters. In my opinion, observing these processes is crucial.

During filming, Wójcik decided to adopt a convention akin to painting. For example, when shooting a pasture in the rain, he brought the camera closer to the meadow, explaining: "I did it because I noticed that water dispersed in the air, settling on the blades of grass, forms droplets that, under their weight, slide down, moving the blades. It was beyond my thoughts". As later analysis by Paulina Kwiatkowska revealed, Wójcik consciously employed expressive means such as close-ups, plastic manipulation of shades of gray, and predominantly unhurried camera movement. Years later, Kutz claimed that his directorial style referred to "Stendhal's literary philosophy of crystallization of feelings and the time of love". The director considered his work a "film about virgins, about initiation in terrible conditions", strongly opposing the "hurrapatriotic" creations of Andrzej Wajda.

Zofia Marcinkowska played the role of Lucyna, having previously been expelled from the AST National Academy of Theatre Arts in Kraków for her appearance in Bohdan Poręba's film Lunatycy (Lunatics, 1959). Marcinkowska won the lead actress role over candidates like Beata Tyszkiewicz and Elżbieta Czyżewska. Makeup artist Halina Turant subtly adjusted Marcinkowska's face to fit the mood of the scenes, achieving necessary effects by "emphasizing or concealing certain irregularities of the features, by applying different types of lipstick to various parts of the face". As the film progressed, this resulted in the transformation of the unassuming Lucyna into a beautiful young woman. Young actor Henryk Boukołowski starred alongside Marcinkowska as the lead.

The following locations in Bystrzyca Kłodzka served as filming sites: the road bridge along Kolejowa Street, 11 Sienna Street, Podmiejska Street, Wolności Square, Mały Rynek, 1 Floriańska Street, and the Bystrzyca Kłodzka Przedmieście railway station.

Kutz attempted to conclude his work with the first erotic scene in the history of Polish cinema, showcasing the naked bodies of the characters. However, censorship permanently cut this scene from the film, which Kutz commented on as follows: "Deprived of its point, Nikt nie woła resembles a naked man with covered or castrated genitals".

== Reception ==
=== Critical reception at premiere ===
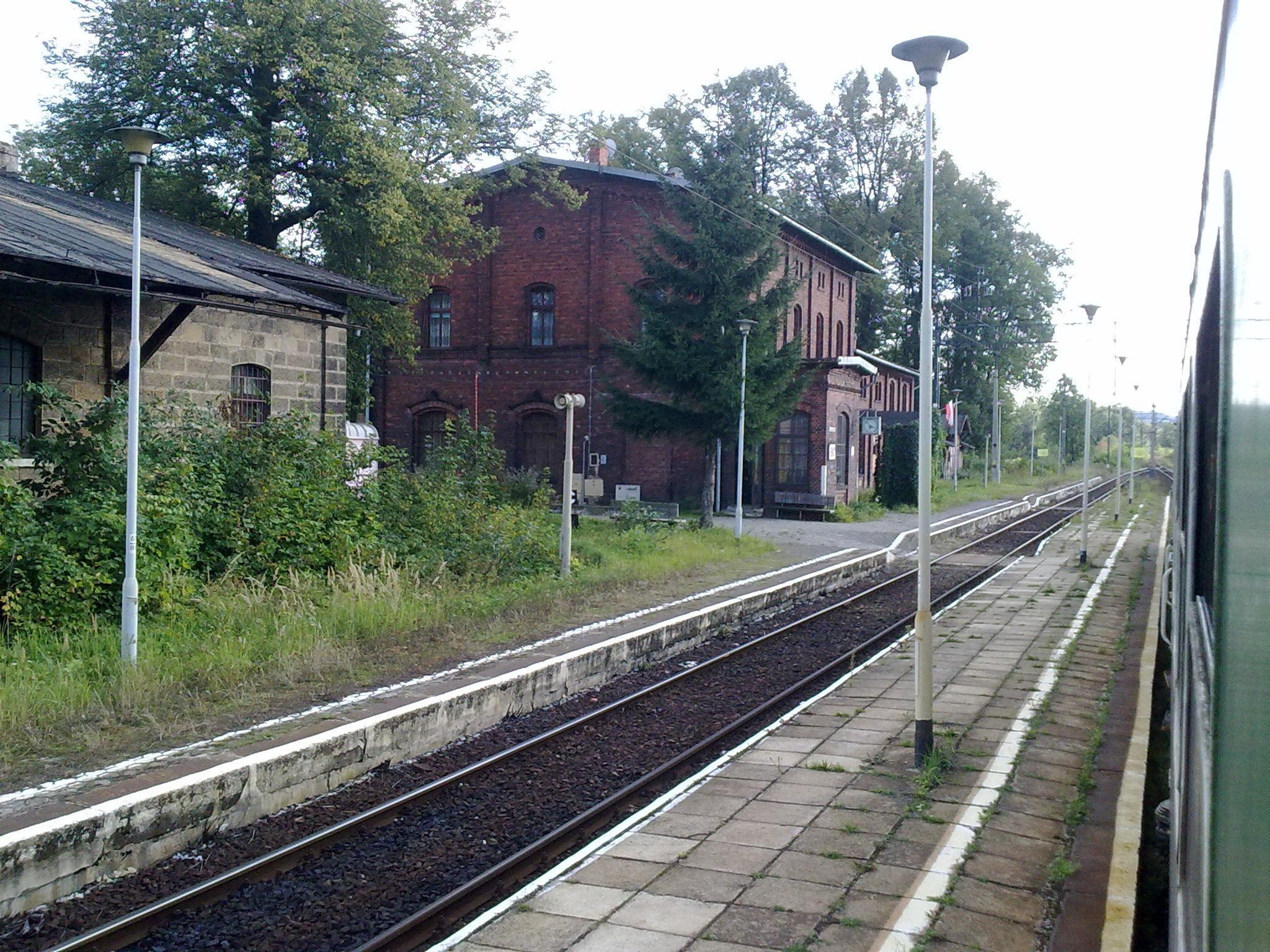
Train station where Bożek's adventure with Zielno begins and ends

At the time of its premiere, Nikt nie woła was met with very negative reviews, which significantly limited its distribution. It was only distributed in two copies and was gradually removed from cinema screens due to low attendance. The Politburo of the Polish United Workers' Party also banned the distribution of Kutz's film abroad.

Stanisław Janicki regarded Kutz and Hen's film as a "misunderstanding", while Czesław Michalski saw it as an example of "anti-film", understood as "something absolutely contrary to all previous conventions and rules of art, to which film owes its current rank and without which it would never have emerged from the fairground booth". According to Stanisław Grzelecki, Nikt nie woła is a film whose "interpretation in the context of today [...] would be a misunderstanding". Aleksander Jackiewicz received Kutz and Hen's film with disappointment, claiming that it "did not seize the great opportunity to become the second Ashes and Diamonds (1958)". Krzysztof Teodor Toeplitz went even further, considering Nikt nie woła to be a film "poisoned by artistry".

=== Evaluation over the years ===
Only years later did Kutz and Hen's work receive more favorable opinions, gaining the status of a cult film. Nikt nie woła was commonly interpreted as a creative polemic with Andrzej Wajda's Ashes and Diamonds (Maciek Chełmicki, unlike Bożek, executed the order). Jan F. Lewandowski stated that Nikt nie woła is "a study of youthful love, or rather emotional immaturity", describing it as "a work of poetic sensitivity". Tadeusz Lubelski assessed Nikt nie woła as "the most original film by Kutz from this period of the Polish Film School". According to Adam Garbicz, Kutz and Hen's work is "a brilliant cinematographic and editing portrayal of the spiritual life of young people [...], not inferior in formal terms to the pioneering endeavors of Antonioni". Jan F. Lewandowski, praising the atmospheric music of Wojciech Kilar and the cinematography of Jerzy Wójcik, wrote: "The extraordinary scenery of a dying world creates the truth of this film about impossible love, and some shots amaze with their beauty and refinement".

Janusz Gazda argued that the artistic merits of Kutz's film stem from a conscious distance from the mainstream of Polish cinema. As Gazda noted, the director of Nikt nie woła "was not concerned with political mechanisms, the balance of power, or the problems of political consciousness; he tracked the internal conflicts of a young boy and a young girl, living as if on the margins of great events". Gazda regarded Nikt nie woła as "the most significant film in the biography of Kazimierz Kutz and one of the most important in Polish cinematography, although at the time it was undervalued". Justyna Żelasko classified Kutz's film among the inaugural works of Polish film modernism, interpreted as stories "about an individual who [...] has lost contact with the surrounding world, about the discord between a person and their social, historical backdrop, and the people around them". In this sense, Nikt nie woła shows significant similarities to Michelangelo Antonioni's L'Avventura (1960). When the film was finally distributed during a retrospective of Polish cinema in Turin in 1989, foreign critics unanimously compared Kutz's work to Antonioni, which is illustrated by the quote from Stanisław Zawiśliński about the reviewers: "Kutz surpassed him [Antonioni], but we didn't know it".

== Bibliography ==
- Gazda, Janusz (1972). "Obserwacja i kreowanie. O twórczości Kazimierza Kutza" [Observation and Creation: On the Work of Kazimierz Kutz]. Kino (in Polish).
- Klich, A. (2019). Cały ten Kutz. Biografia niepokorna [All That Kutz: A Defiant Biography] (in Polish). Kraków: Znak.
- Kwiatkowska, Paulina (2008). "Krystalizacja uczuć w obrazie filmowym. O "Nikt nie woła" Kazimierza Kutza" [The Crystallization of Emotions in the Film Image: On "Nobody's Calling" by Kazimierz Kutz]. Kwartalnik Filmowy (in Polish) (64): 148–166.
- Lubelski, T. (2015). Historia kina polskiego 1895-2014 [History of Polish Cinema 1895-2014] (in Polish). Kraków: Universitas.
- Ozimek, S. (1980). "Od wojny w dzień powszedni" [From War to Everyday Life]. In Toeplitz, J. (ed.). Historia filmu polskiego [History of Polish Cinema] (in Polish). Vol. 4. Warsaw: Wydawnictwa Artystyczne i Filmowe.
