= KOR Committee for Social Self-Defence =

Polish civil society group (1977–1981)

The KOR Committee for Social Self-Defence (Polish: Komitet Samoobrony Społecznej KOR) was a Polish civil society group that emerged under the communist rule. It was created in 1977-1978 from the Workers' Defence Committee (Komitet Obrony Robotników). It was one of the movements whose activities led to the creation of Solidarity. The KOR was absorbed into Solidarity in 1981.

== History ==
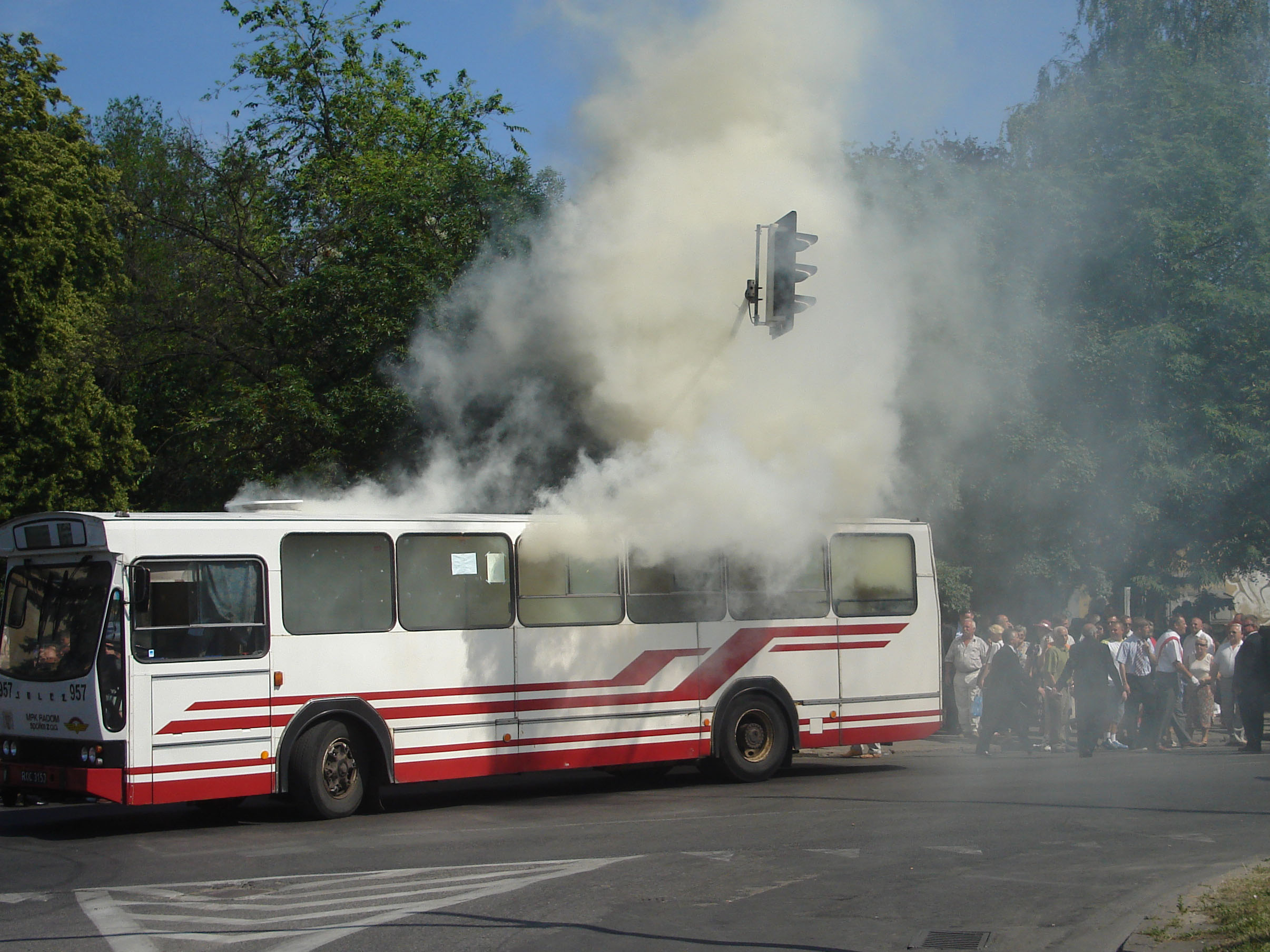
Reenactment of 1976 protests in Radom, leading to mass arrests. The Committee for Social Self-Defense KOR was formed to represent and help the victims.

The Committee for Social Self-Defence 'KOR' (with only fourteen members upon its formation in 1978) grew rapidly into an important 'political pressure group' shaping the doctrines of the emerging opposition movement of the 1970s in communist Poland. Their program was adopted on a mass scale in the summer of 1980 constituting the basis for the Solidarity ideology. Over the 5 years of its existence, KSS-KOR wielded tremendous influence on Poland's social self-organization, It aimed to defend "human and civil rights"; "oppose breaches of the law"; "safeguard civil liberties"; "fight political, religious and ideological persecution"; and to "provide help for the persecuted". The KOR members insisted on operating openly in public – wrote Jeremy Brecher – and for that, they were blacklisted by the authorities, beaten by the MO, and often imprisoned. They nonetheless persisted, opposing the communist regime in Poland, and triggering the process of social change which culminated in the collapse of communism two decades later. The creation of KSS KOR was preceded by the massive increases in food prices in 1976, which led to countrywide June 1976 protests in Radom, Ursus, Płock, Gdańsk, Szczecin, Elbląg, and in Łódź, with 80,000 strikers. The authorities brought in paramilitary ZOMO battalions to crush the protests. More than 1,000 people were thrown to jail, repeatedly beaten, and even tortured. The KSS-KOR was formed specifically to help them survive the ordeal, they collected donations for legal defence, held public lectures, cultural events, and provided aid to families of the victims.
