= Sejm and Senate Complex =

National legislative building in Warsaw, Poland

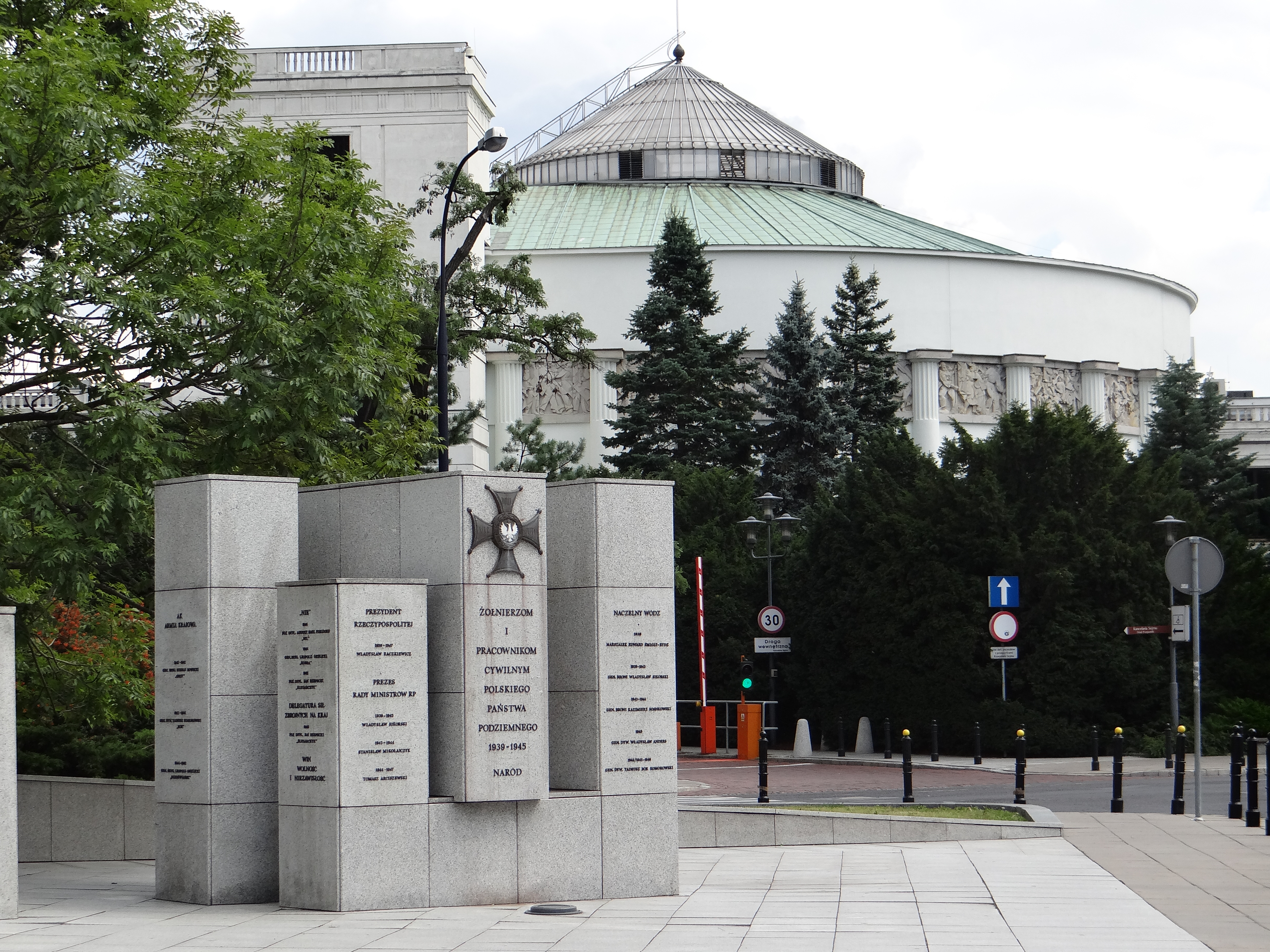
- The oval Meeting Hall

General information
- Architectural style: Stripped Classicism; Modern
- Location: Wiejska Street, Warsaw
- Coordinates: 52°13′31″N 21°01′42″E
- Construction started: 1928
- Completed: 1952; 74 years ago

Design and construction
- Architects: Kazimierz Skórewicz, Bohdan Pniewski

The Sejm and Senate Complex (Polish: Kompleks budynków Sejmu Rzeczypospolitej Polskiej) is a complex of buildings located in central Warsaw, which house the bicameral Polish parliament – the Sejm and Senate of Poland.

The construction of the complex began after Poland regained its independence in 1918. The expansion of the complex continues to the modern-day, with a new building under construction since 2014. All of the buildings part of the complex are managed by the Chancellery of Sejm.

== Buildings ==
=== Main Sejm building ===
==== Sejm Meeting Hall ====
The Meeting Hall was constructed between May 1925 and March 1928, designed by Kazimierz Skórewicz. Except for the Belgian marble used to cover the inner walls, all other construction materials originate from Poland. The oak armchairs, tables and the balustrade were made according to the drawings of architect Stefan Sienicki, and the bas-reliefs on the balustrade separating the bureau from the amphitheater were designed by Aleksander Żurakowski.

The outer wall of the Meeting Hall is decorated with a frieze composed of eighteen stone plates with bas-reliefs made by Jan Biernacki and Jan Szczepkowski, symbolising, inter alia: Liberation, craft, religion, fine arts, plowing, the press and education.

The Meeting Hall is the seat of the Sejm, the National Assembly, observing joint Sejm and Senate meetings, and the location of where the oath-taking of a newly elected President of the Republic of Poland is held.

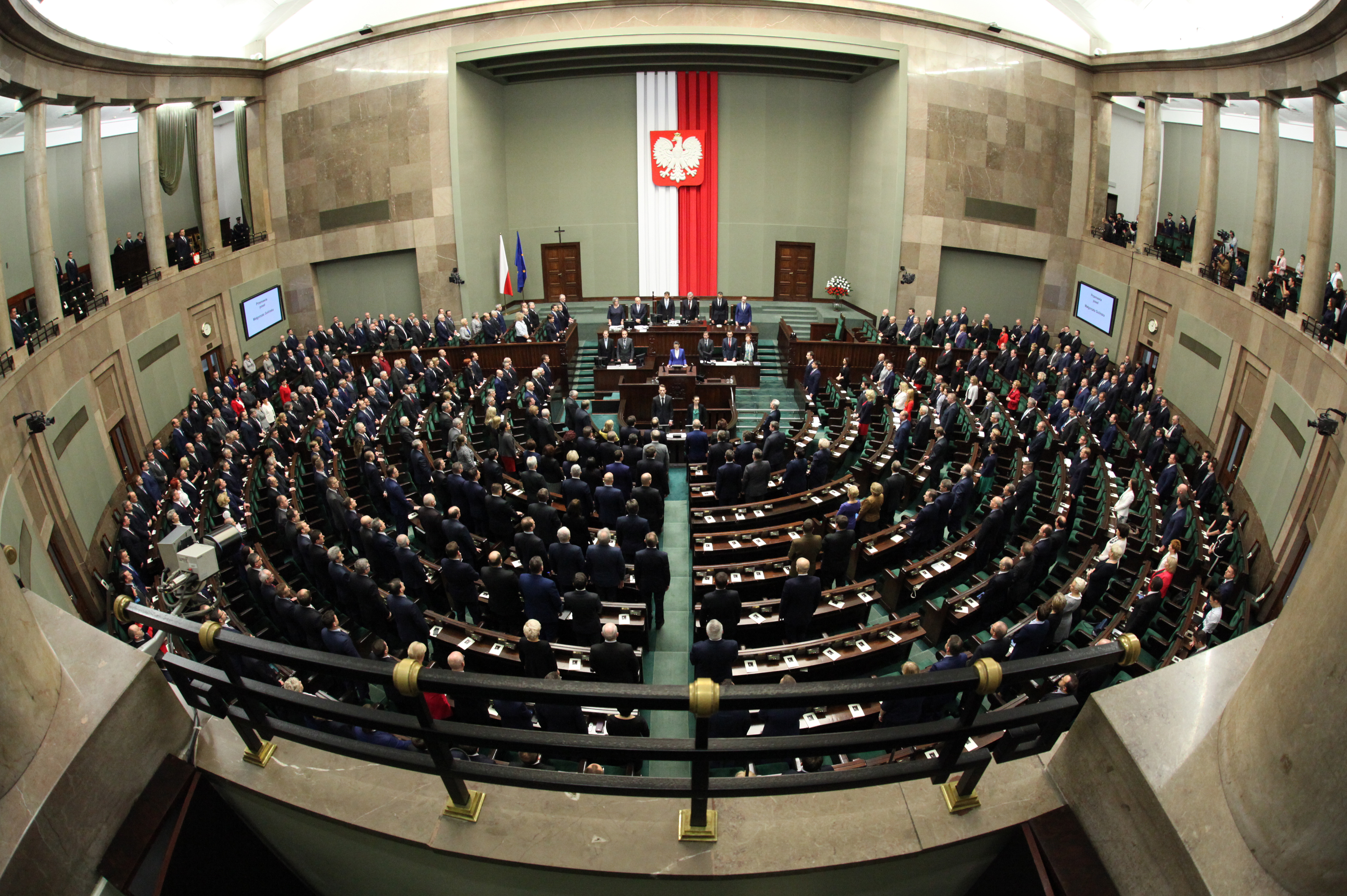
Meeting Hall

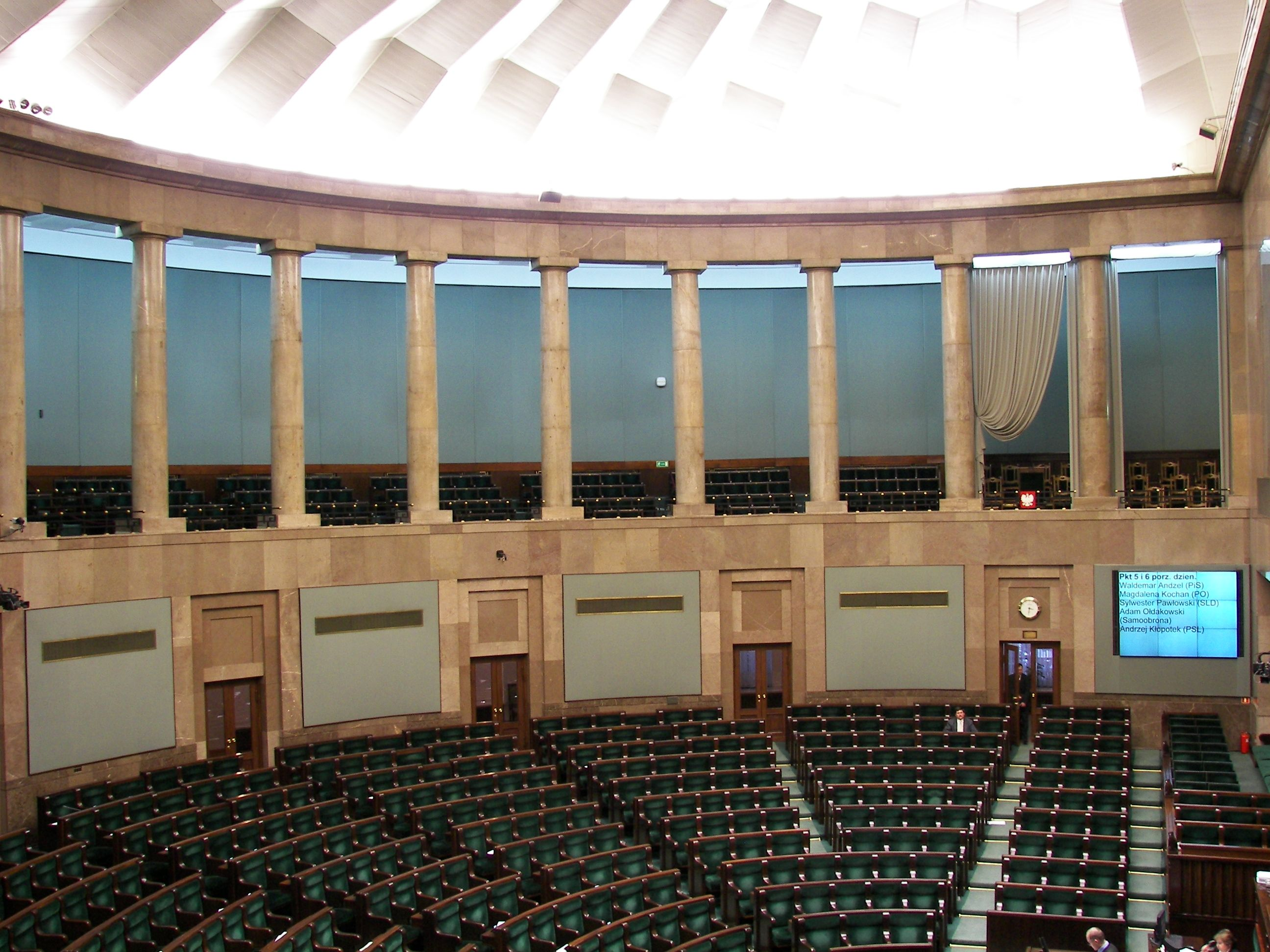
Guest and press gallery. To the right-hand side with the curtains and coat-of-arms is the area for the president, whose chair is larger than the others

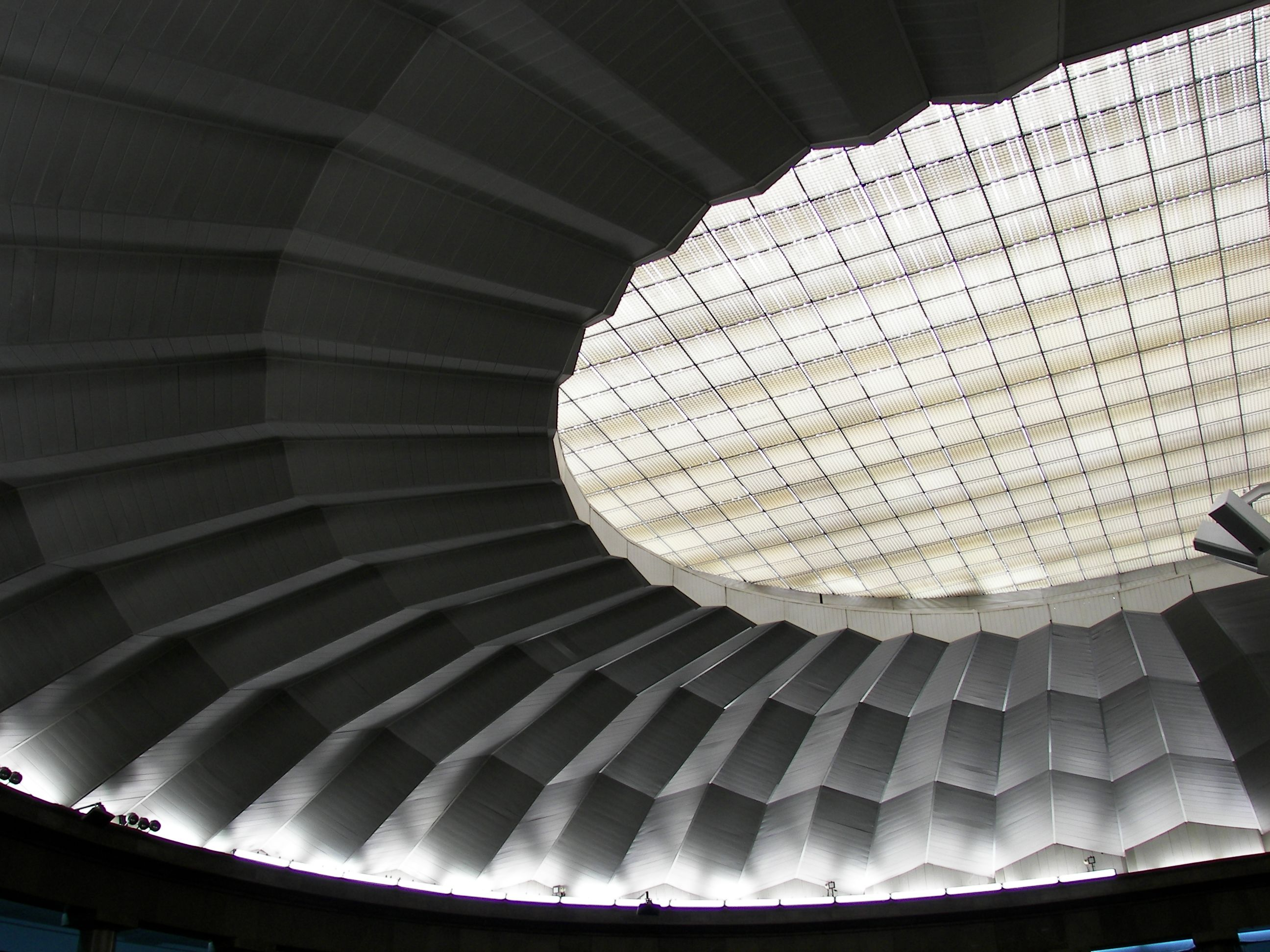
Ceiling

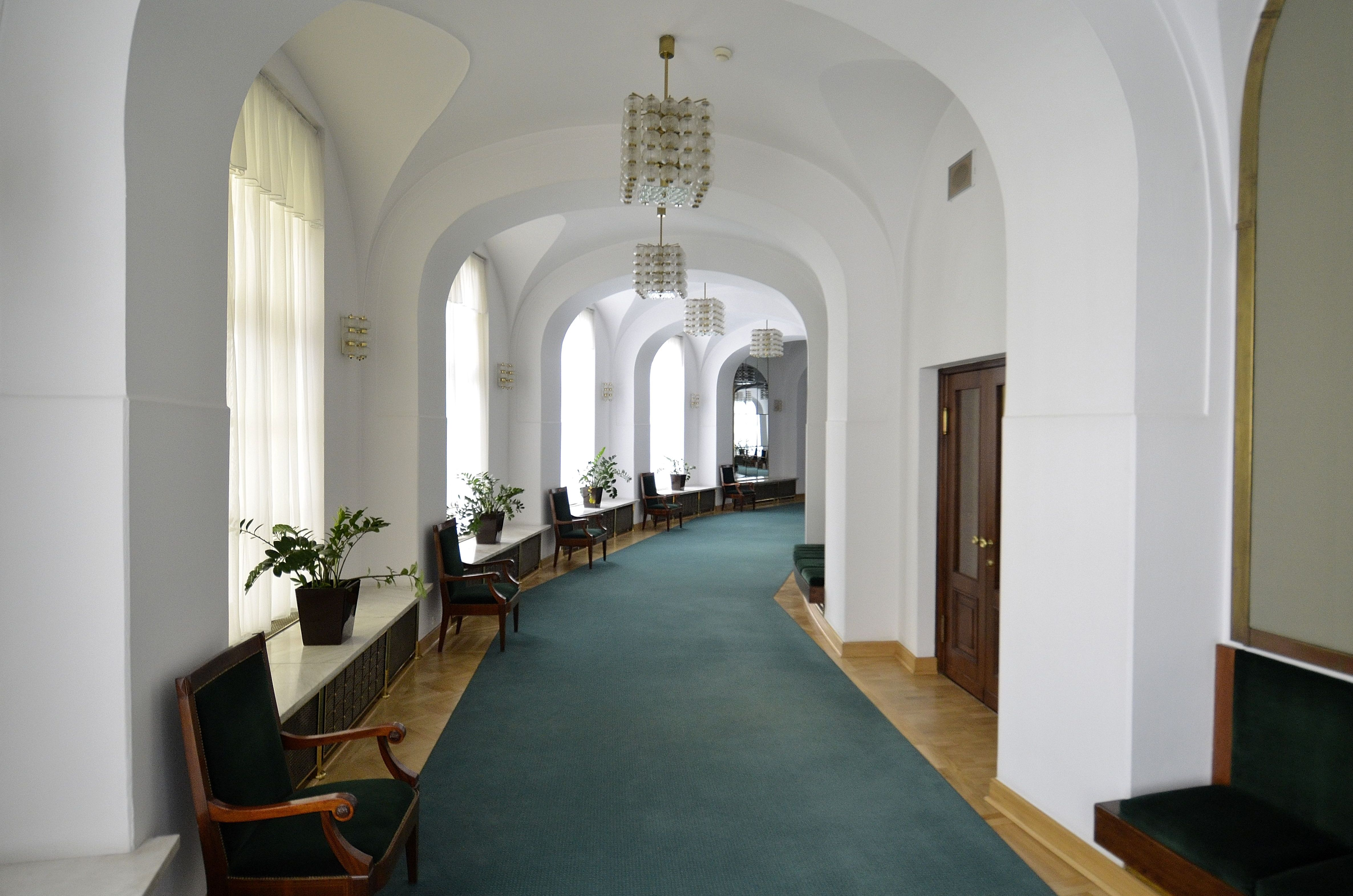
Lobbies of the Meeting Hall

==== Main Hall ====
The building was constructed during the most expansive reconstructions of the Sejm, between 1949 and 1952. It consists of two-storey parts, connected by tunnels. The road heading to the main entrance is found below the building. Since 2016, on the wall opposite the main entrance, lay wall reliefs designed by Józef Gosławski from the 1950s.

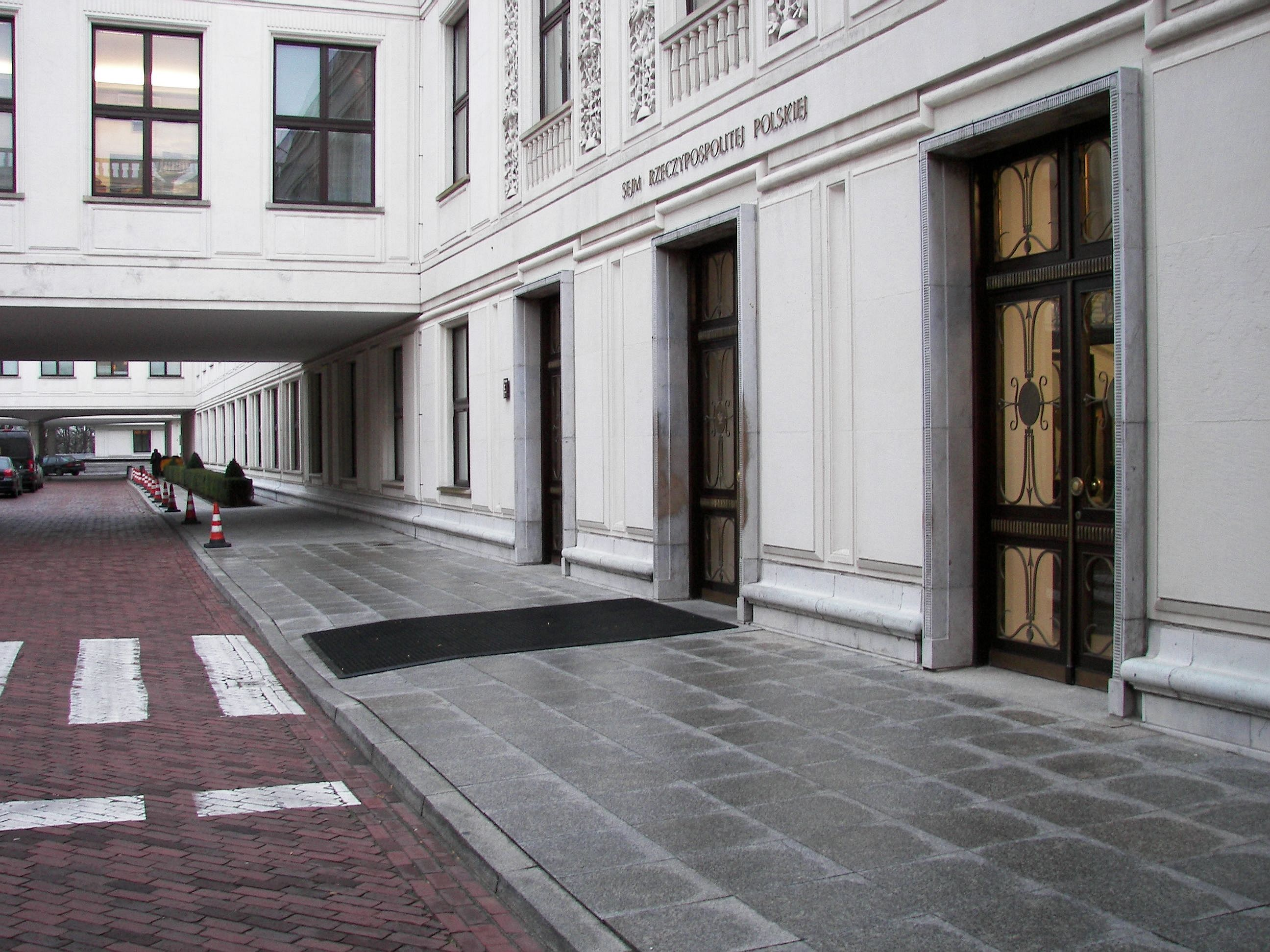
Main entrance

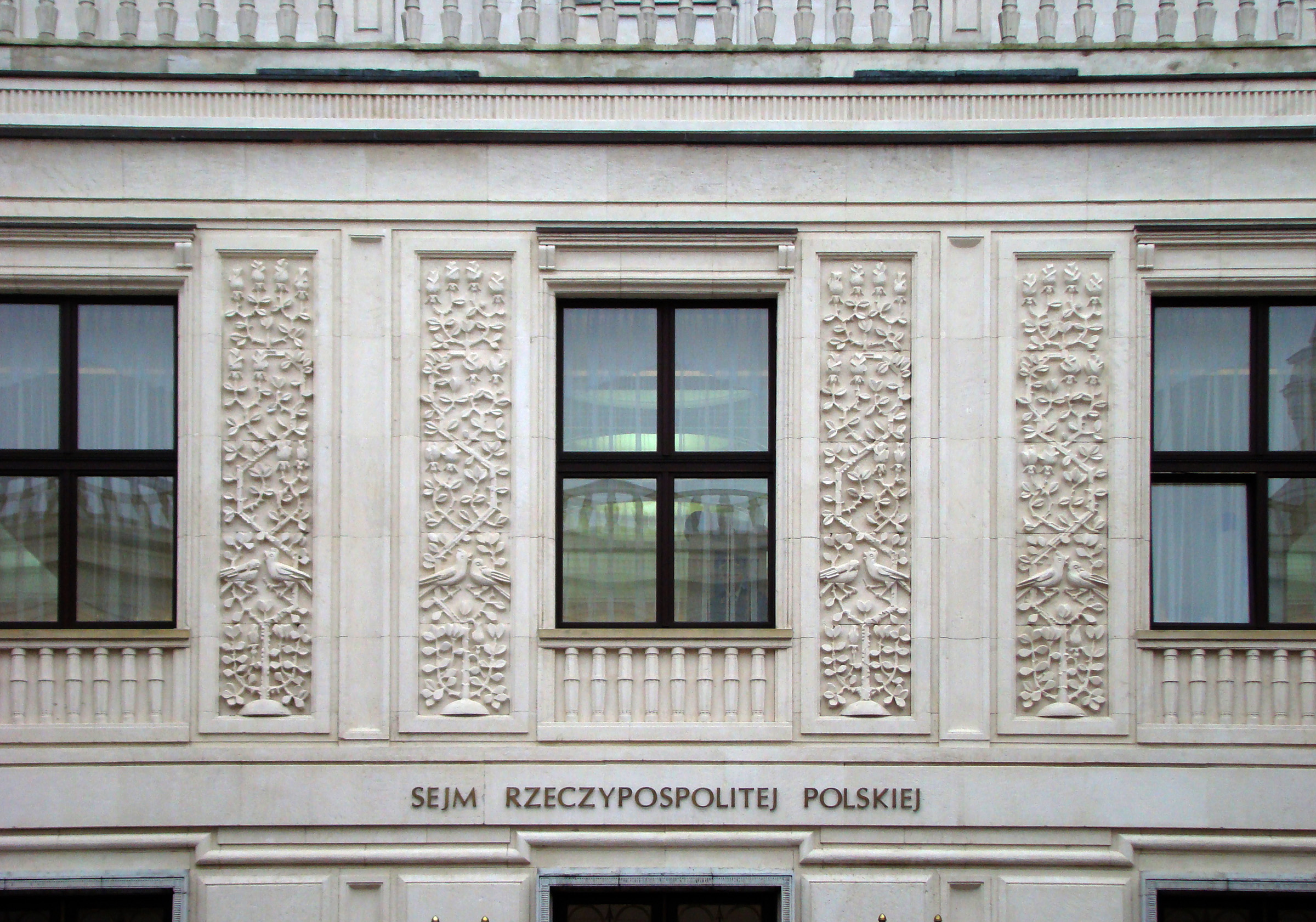
Details carved into white sandstone

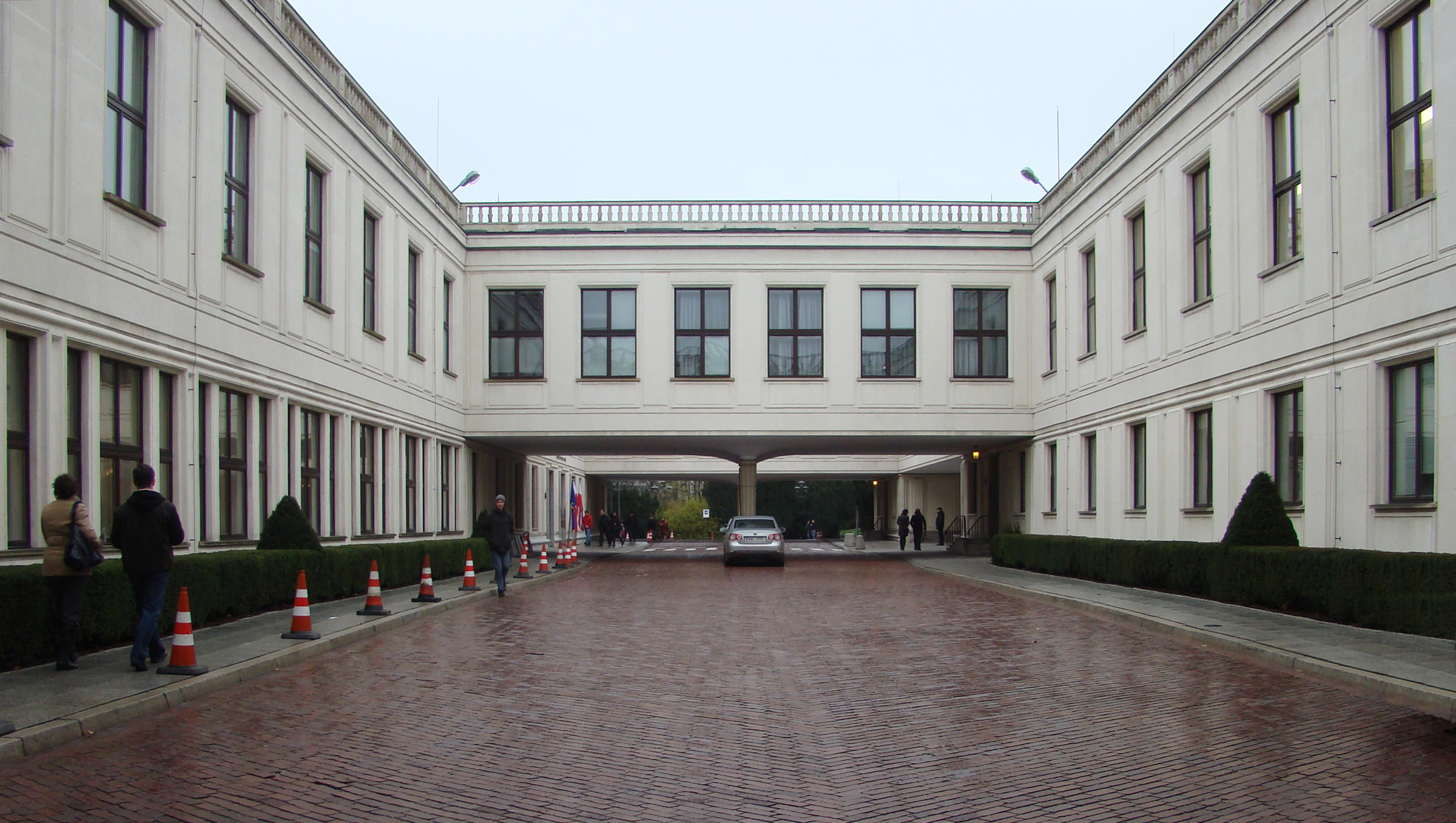
Main building

The Main Hall is found by the main entrance of the Sejm. Its three-tone, white-gray-black floor was made of marble, the hall is characterized by gray stucco columns and portals made of white Carrara marble. In the hall there are marble stairs with a decorative iron balustrades, with golden bas-reliefs of girls and boys, while the brass rail of the balustrade has been made ito the shape of a snake. On both sides of the stairs there are two commemorative plaques commemorating the visit of Pope John Paul II on June 11, 1999.

To the right of the main entrance there is a model of the Sejm complex, above which there are found commemorative plaques: a tribute to the members of parliament of the Second Republic of Poland killed during the Second World War and a commemorative plaque commemorating those killed in 2010 in the Tu-154 catastrophe near Smolensk. Above the entrance is a ceramic clock made in 1955 by Władysław Zych.

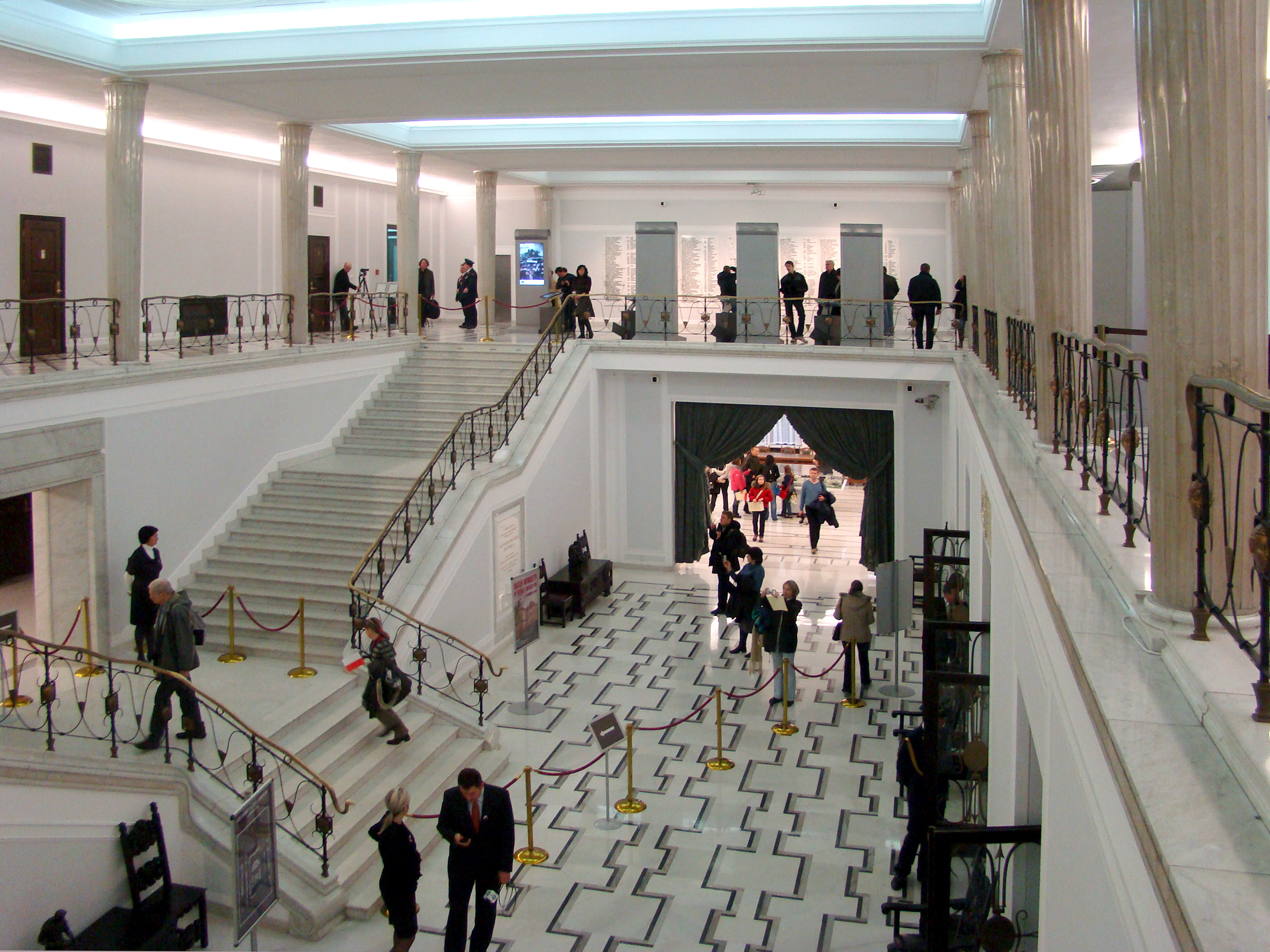
Main Hall

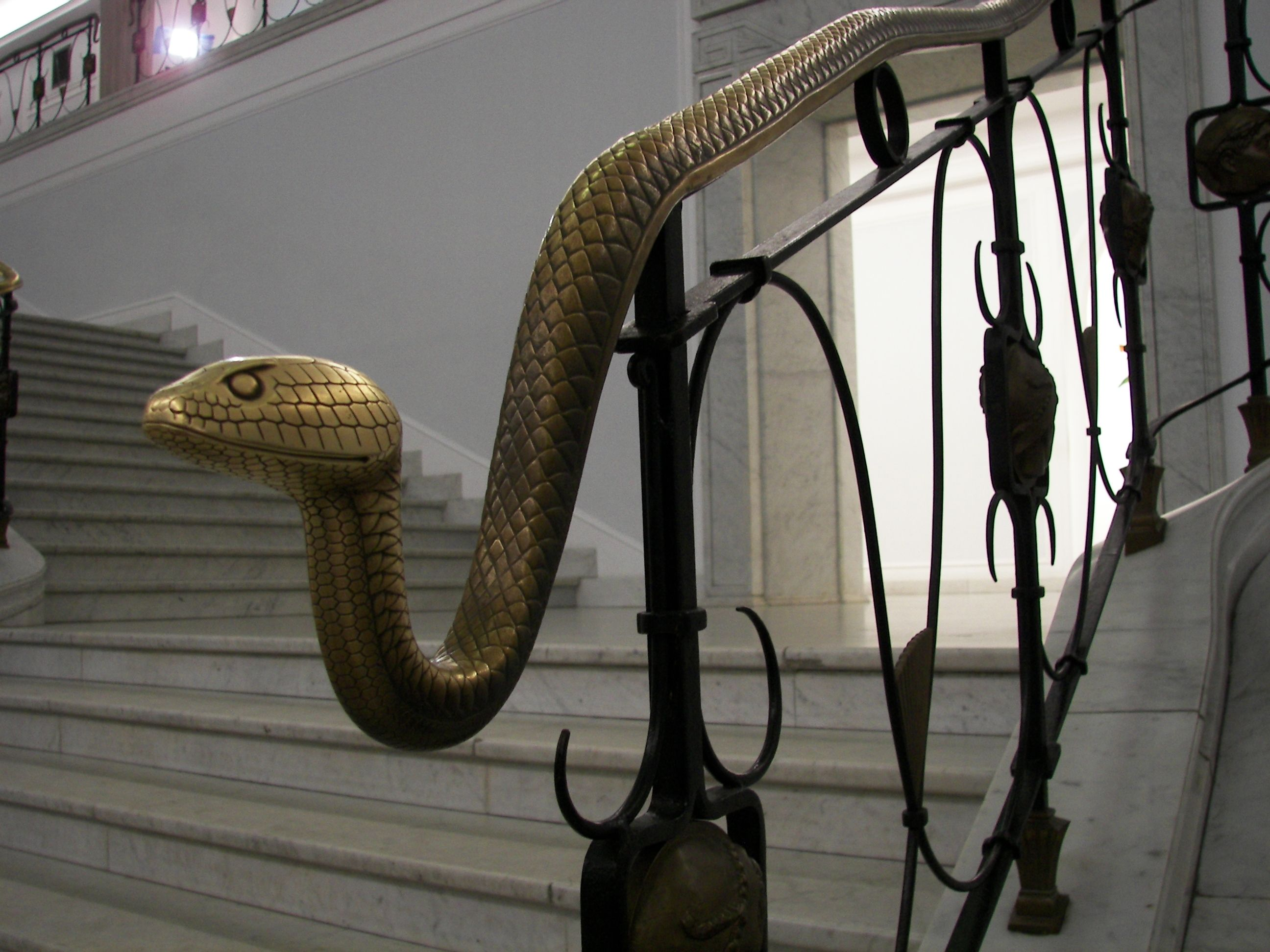
Hand rail detail

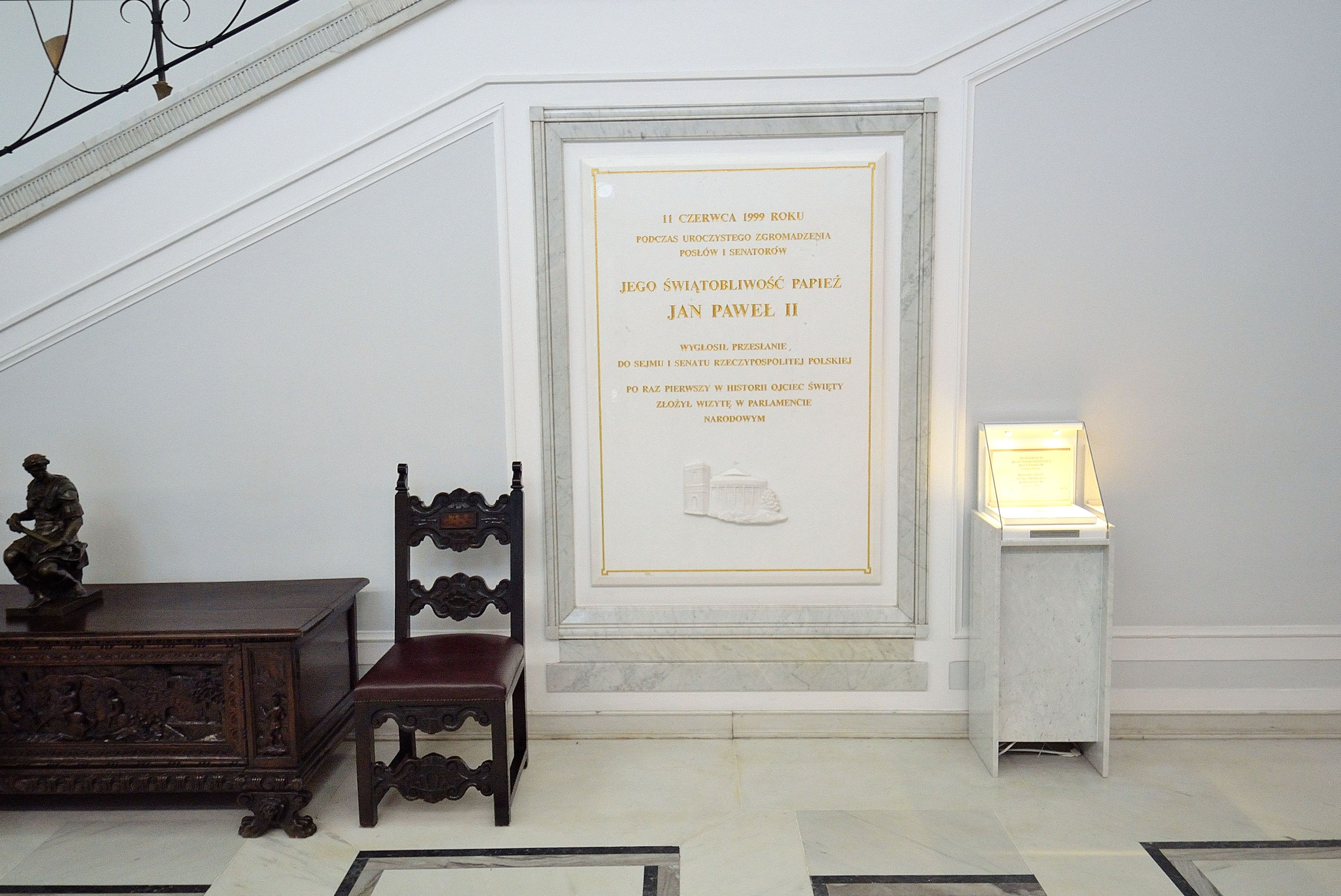
One of the plaques commemorating John Paul II's visit

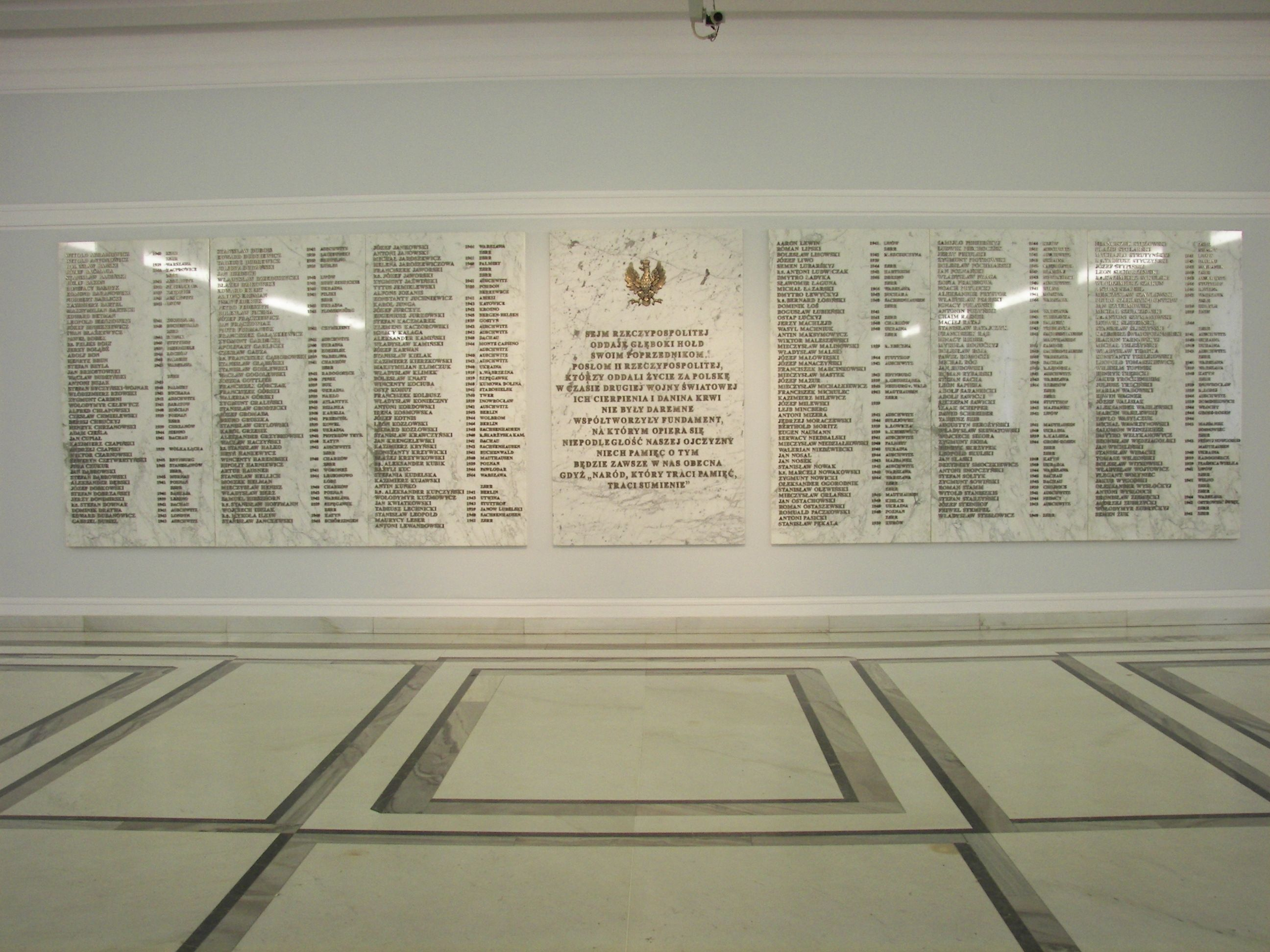
Plaques commemorating the members of parliament killed during World War II

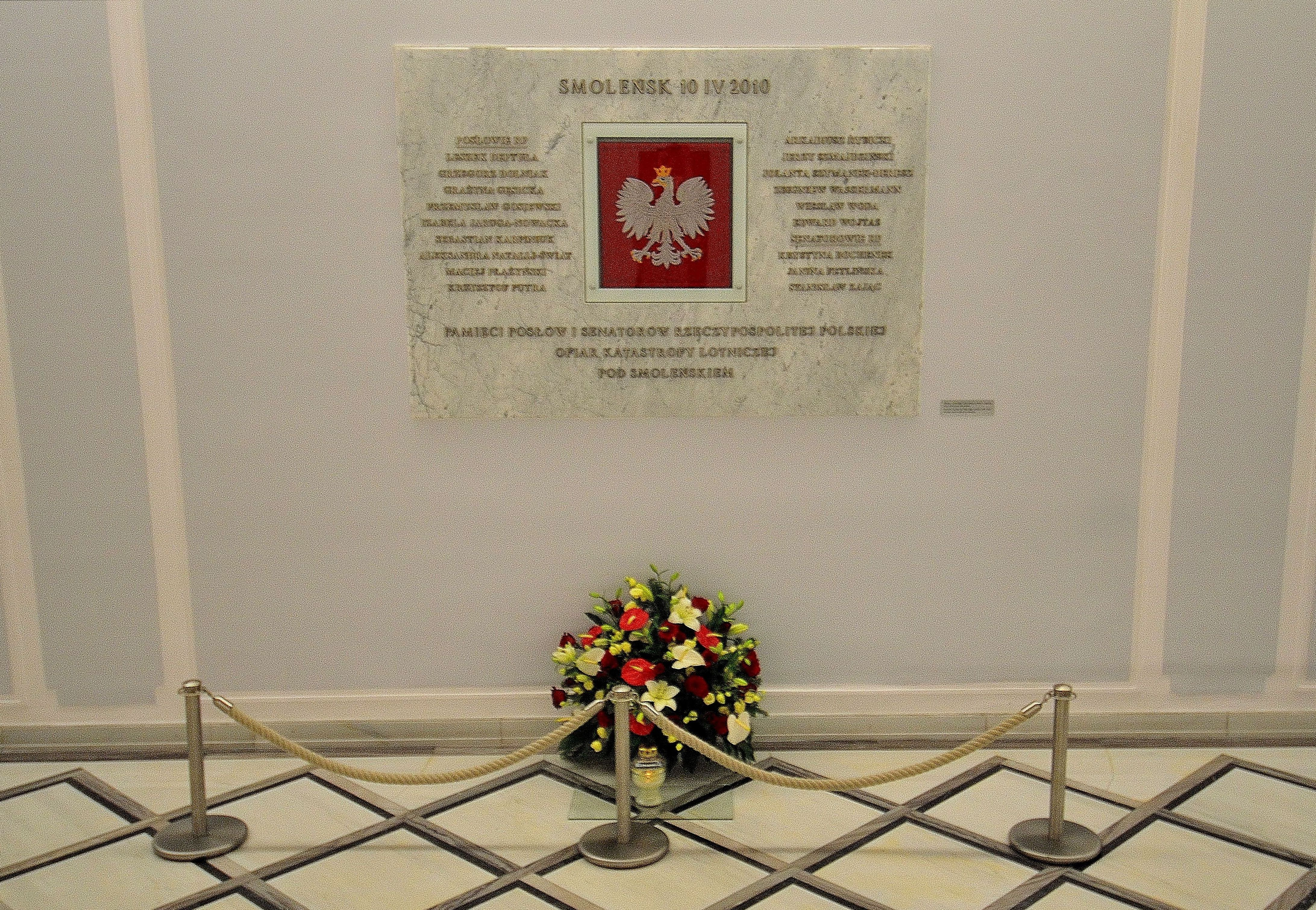
Plaque remembering those who died in the 2010 Polish Air Force catastrophe

==== Column Hall ====
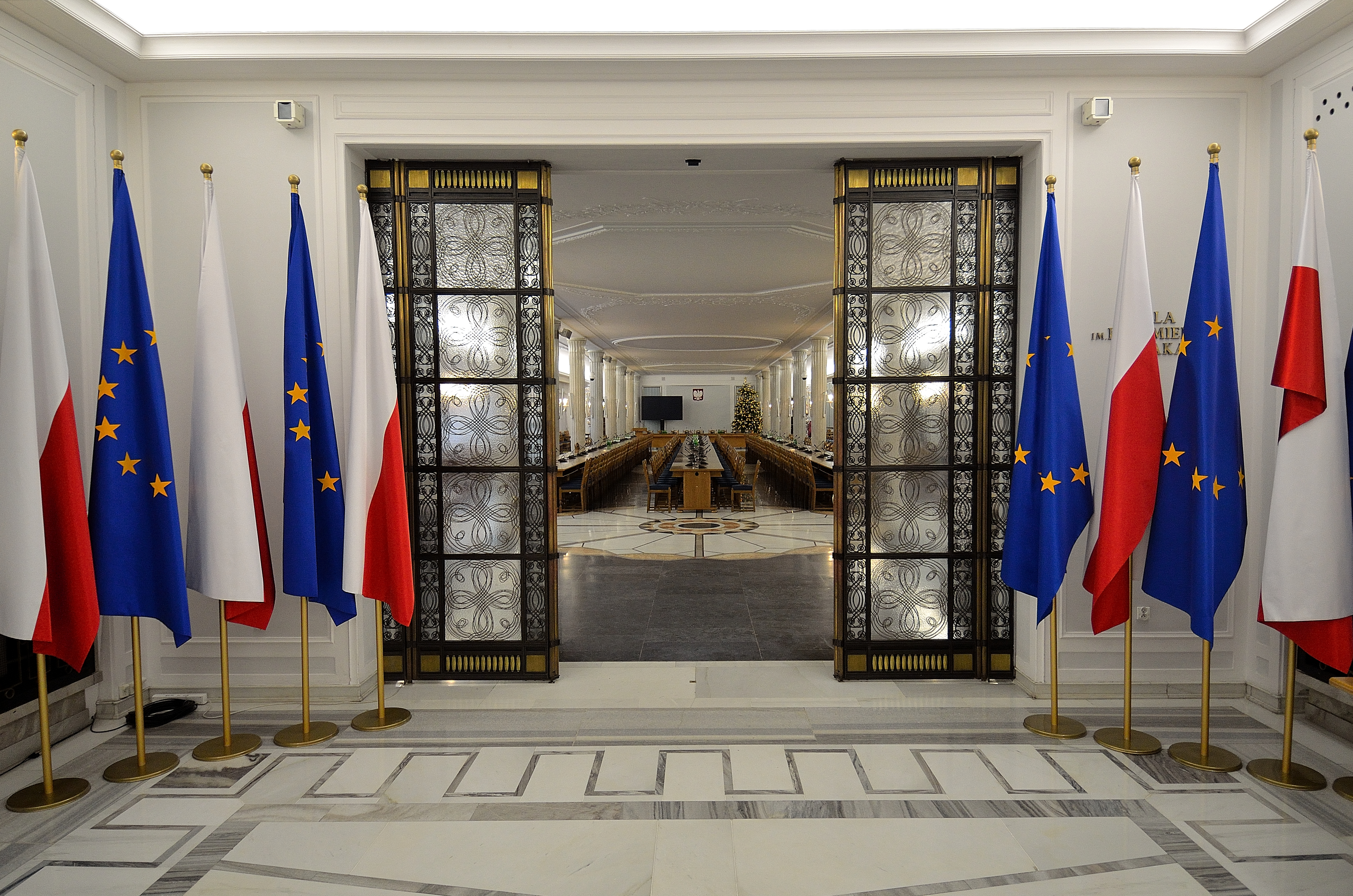
Entrance into Column Hall

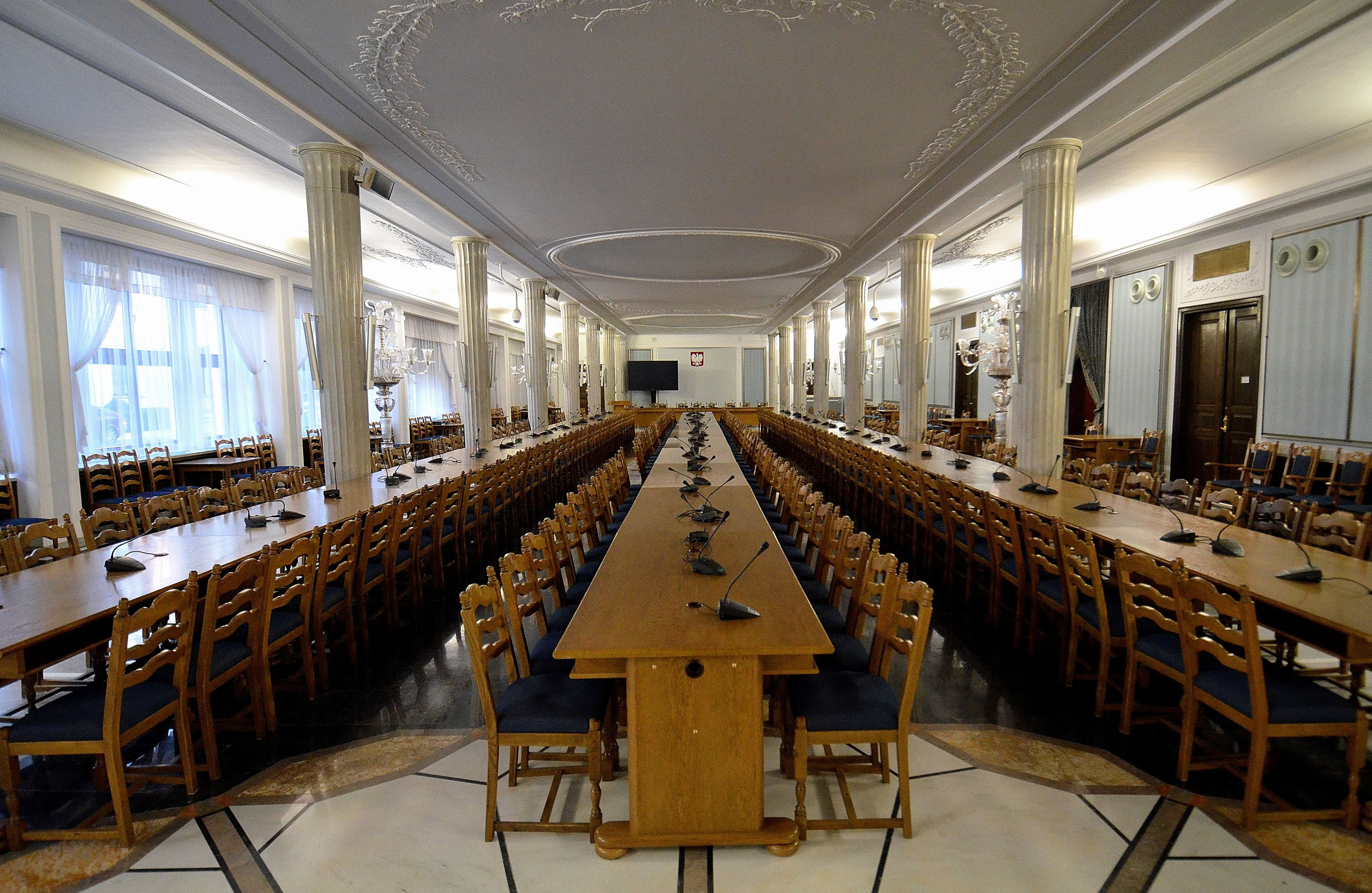
Interior of the Column Hall

To the left of the Main Hall is the Column Hall. Two glass doors with decorative forged grates lead to it. It is the second largest room, at 600 m^{2}, in the complex. It owes its name to the slim, symmetrical columns supporting the ceiling. Its marble floor is decorated with colourful rosettes of multicolored marble and golden chalcedony. The ceiling is decorated with stucco and a crystal candelabra, designed by Tadeusz Gronowski. After the restoration of the Senate's meeting place, between 1989 and May 1991, the Column Hall was the site of its meetings.

==== Marshal Corridor ====
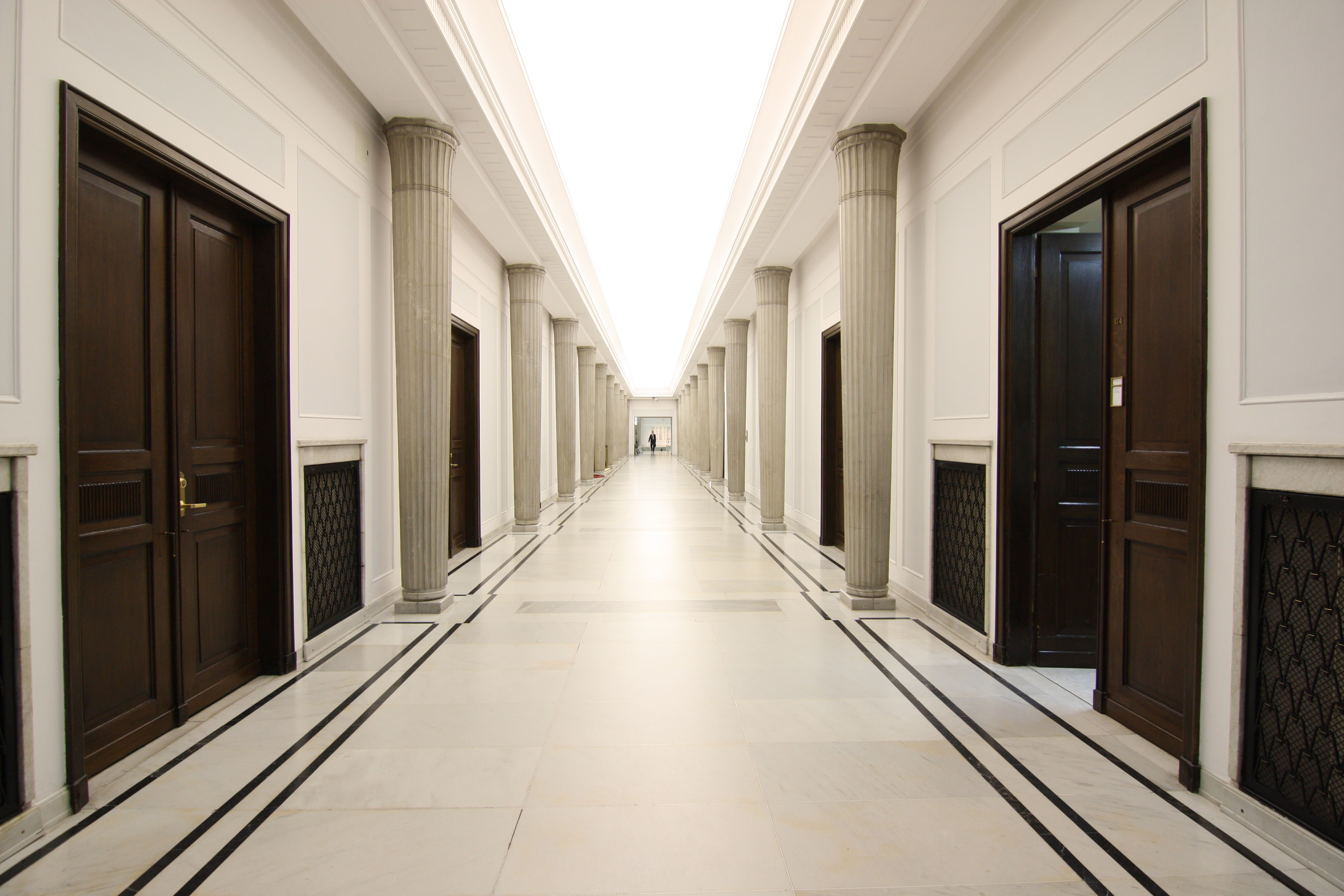
Marshal Corridor

The Marshal Corridor links building C with buildings A and B. Its ceiling is supported by two rows of columns tapering downwards along the walls, which optically increase the length, height and width of the corridor. On both sides there are rooms providing entry into the Presidential and Prime Minister's chambers, as well as four other large chambers: the Chamber of the Constitution of May 3 and the rooms bearing plaques with names of three Marshals of the Sejm of the Second Republic of Poland (hence the name of the corridor): Wojciech Trąmpczyński, Ignacy Daszyński and Maciej Rataj. From the Senate side, the corridor closes in with a decorative iron grate made by Jan Mizerski.

==== Senate building and Main Hall ====
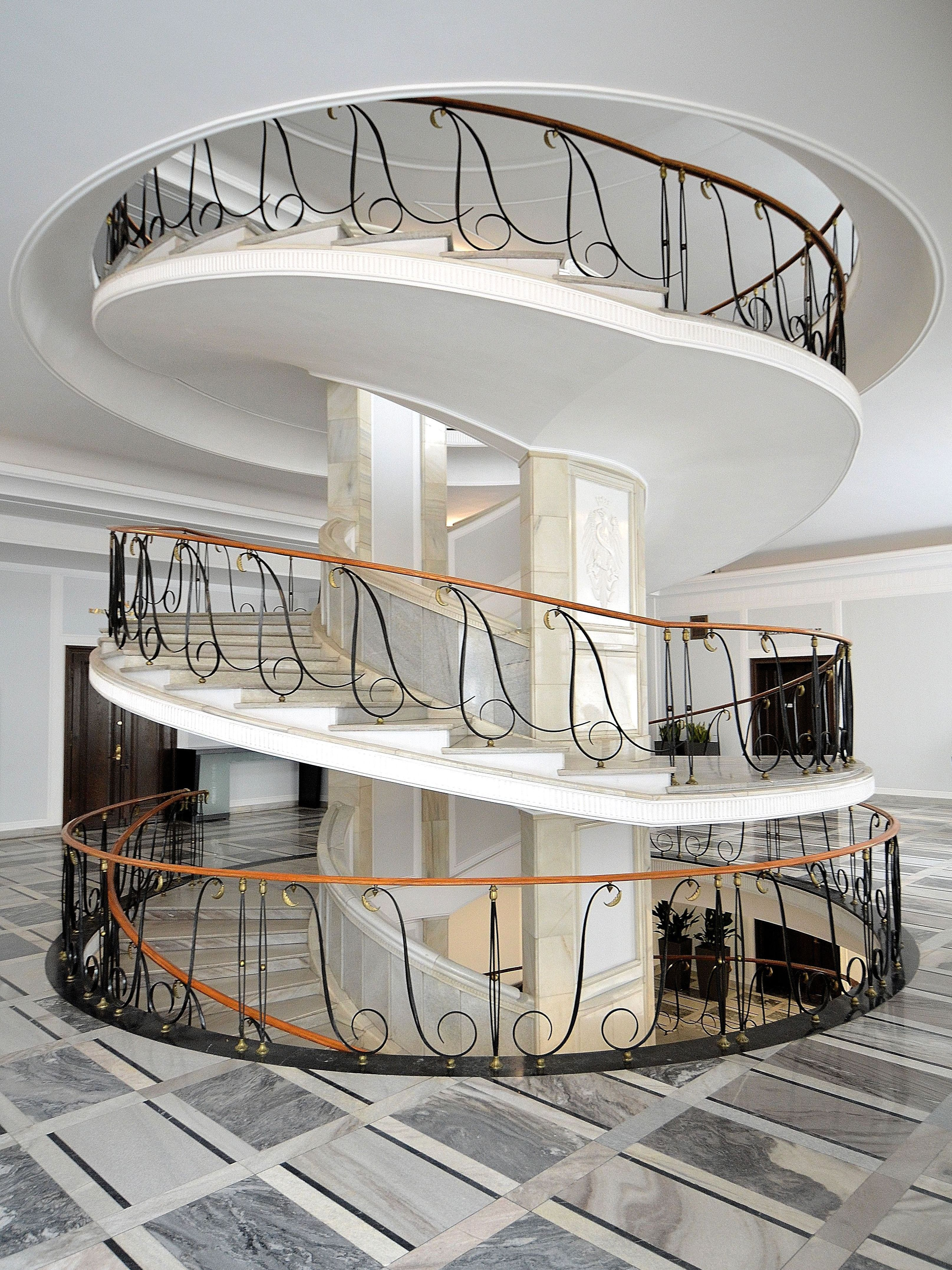
The iconic spiral staircase in the Senate building's Main Hall

After the renovation of the second Chamber of Parliament on April 7, 1989, the Senate convened alternately with the Sejm in the Chamber of Sejm, and then for one-and-a-half years in the Column Hall. For the purpose of the Upper Chamber, building A of the Senate Meeting Hall was adapted from a combination of three library rooms, located on the first floor of the building. In the central part of the building there is an oval staircase, to which, through the floor connector into building C, is the location of the Marshal Corridor. Its balustrade is made of iron rods, forged in the pattern of dry plant veal. The staircase is marked by the extraordinary dynamics of form. Perfectly visible from all sides of the lobby, it is the most iconic feature of the Senate building.

The adaptation of the former library building was carried out between autumn 1990 to spring 1991. The Main Hall was rebuilt using designs of Andrzej Kaliszewski, with the cooperation of Barbara Kaliszewska and Bogdan Napieralski. The designers referred to Bohdan Pniewski's designs from the 1950s, preserving the colours and modern-day features used in parliamentary rooms. The interior was decorated with bright colours, with pale-coloured walls and an oval plafond.

==== Sejm Commission building ====
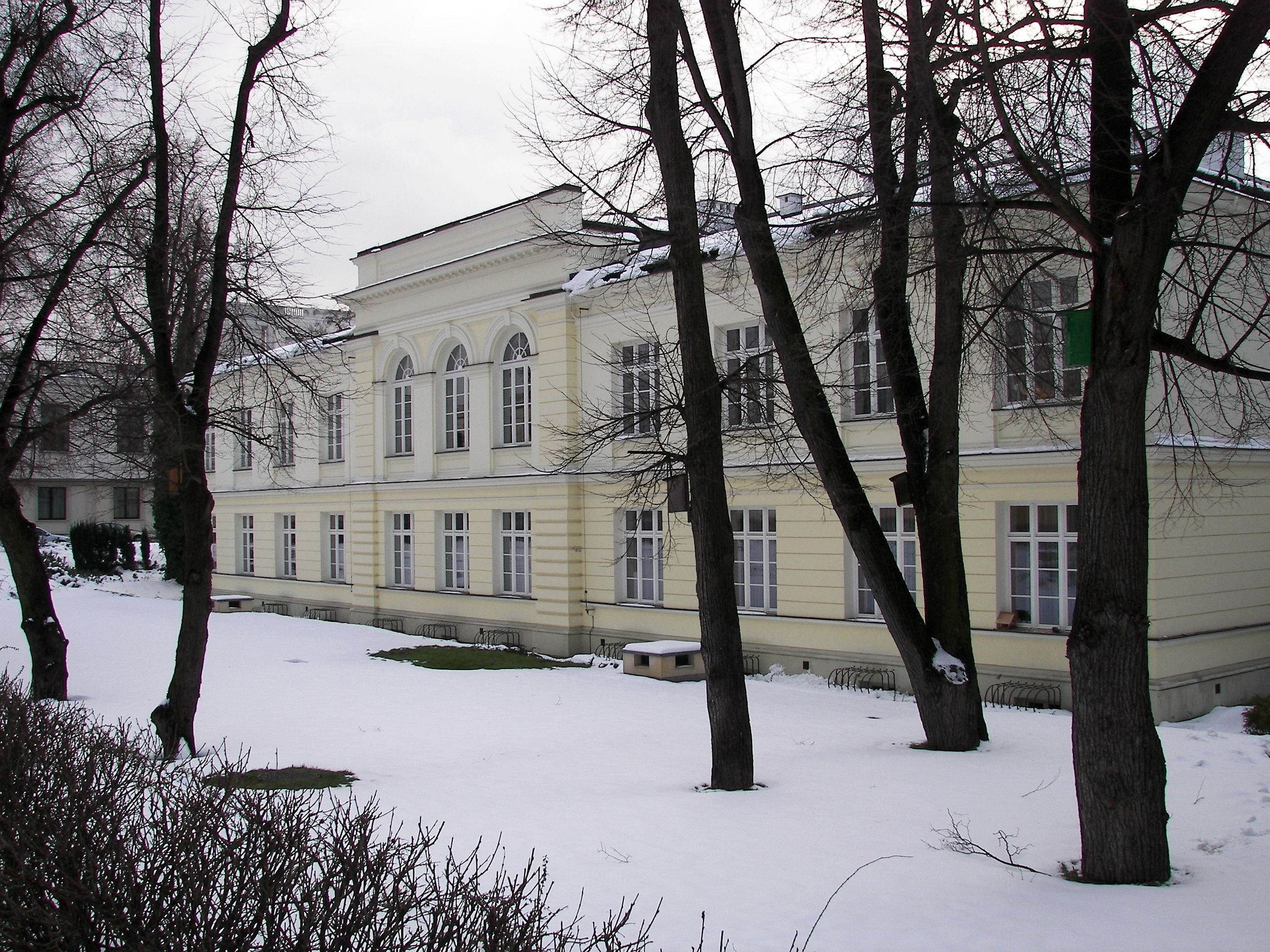
Sejm Commission building

The nineteenth-century building is located in the north-east of the Sejm complex. In the interwar period it was the seat of the Senate, and after the war the Chancellery of the State Council. There were plans for its adaptation into a parliamentary museum, but after the completion of the renovation work in 1992 it was decided that the Sejm Commission would be held there. The renovation, carried out in 1992, included a new interior design, carried out on the basis of architect's Aleksander Stępińska design.

==== Old House for Members of the Sejm ====
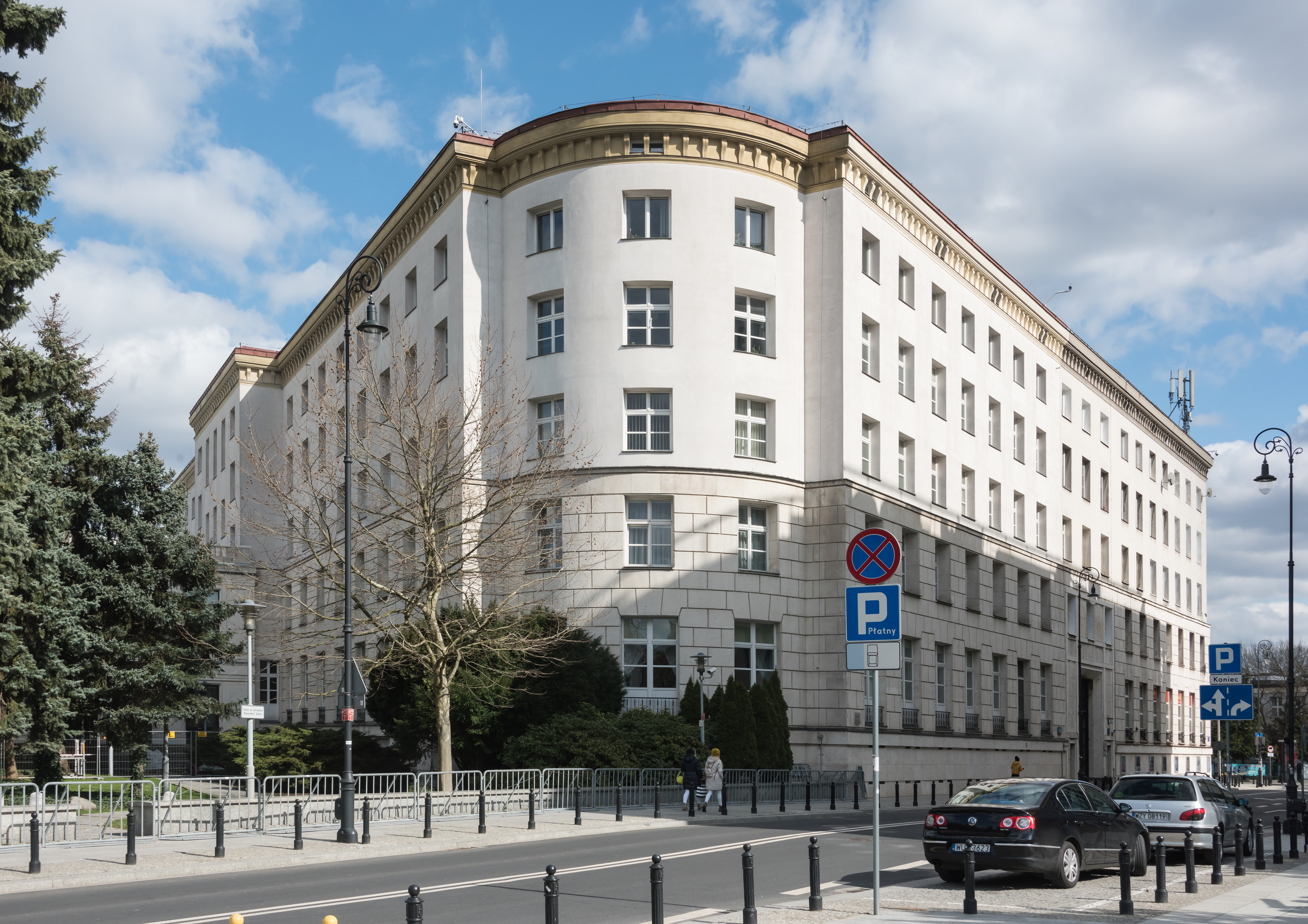
Old Members of Parliament House

The former Sejm Hotel, now called the Old House for Members of the Sejm, was erected according to the design of Kazimierz Skórewicz. On the north side, the central axis of the building is characterised by a flat break with an oval corner. This building is connected to the Sejm Meeting Hall by a floor connector on the first floor, preserving the original balustrade attic. After the Second World War the longer wing of the hotel was extended southward, in accordance to Bohdan Pniewski's designs. Thus, an inner courtyard was created in front of the hotel, where the gates from Wiejska and Górnośląska Street are leading towards. Pniewski stylised the oval corner of the building into a cylindrical tower.

Presently, the building houses the Sejm Library.

==== New House for Members of the Sejm ====
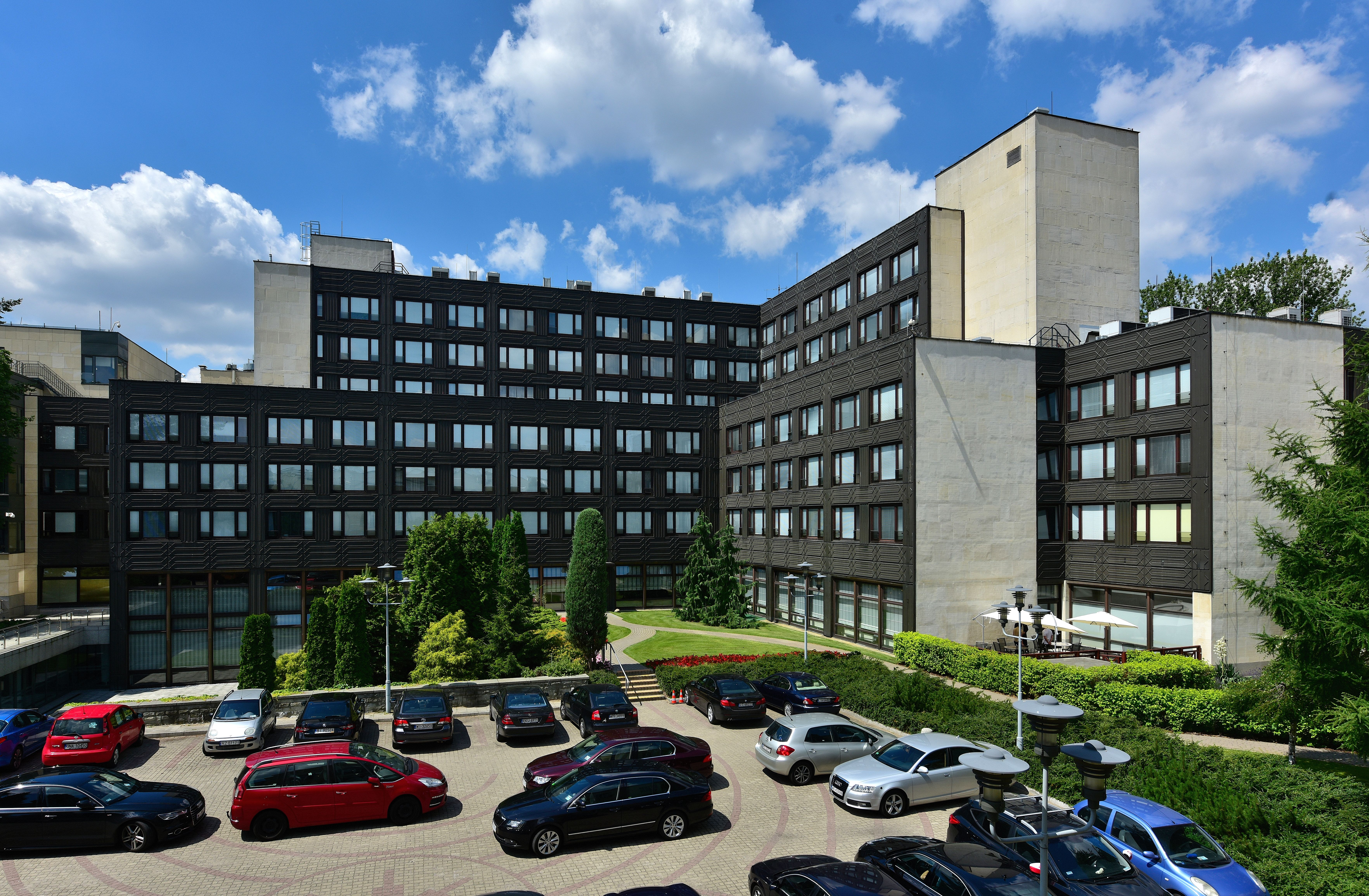
New Members of Parliament House

The pre-war Sejm Hotel became too crowded across the years. The New House for Members of the Sejm was constructed on the basis of architect Małgorzata Handzelewicz-Wacławek's designs, with the cooperation of Andrzej Kaliszewski. The building was commissioned for use in the spring of 1989.

The building closes-in the Sejm complex to the north-west. The main hall of the new hotel extends over two floors of the hotel, connected by a stairway. There is a reception and ticket offices for: PKP Intercity and LOT, PKO Bank. The building also houses shops, a swimming pool, sauna and a conference room. On the ground floor there is a restaurant and a cocktail bar. Expansion of the building was conducted in 1987–1994.

In 2015, the conference room in the New House for Members of the Sejm, hosts the discussions of the Commission for Social Policy and the Family, named after Jacek Kuroń. At the entrance to the conference room there is a plaque commemorating four Members of Sejm and a member of the Chancellery of the Sejm, who died in a car accident in 1994.

==== Sejm Chapel ====
The patron of the Sejm Chapel is the Virgin Mary. The chapel is located at level -1 of the New House for Members of the Sejm. It was ordained on May 1, 1993, by Cardinal Józef Glemp. The altar and statues illustrating the Stations of the Cross, were done so by Jan Tutaj, funded by contributions from Sejm members, consecrated in June 2007 by Cardinal Kazimierz Nycz. The original chair of Pope John Paul II, used during the Holy Father's visit to the Sejm in 1999, is a very valuable element of the chapel.

Mass is celebrated every day, from Monday to Friday, at 07:30, in the Sejm Chapel.

== Complex plan ==
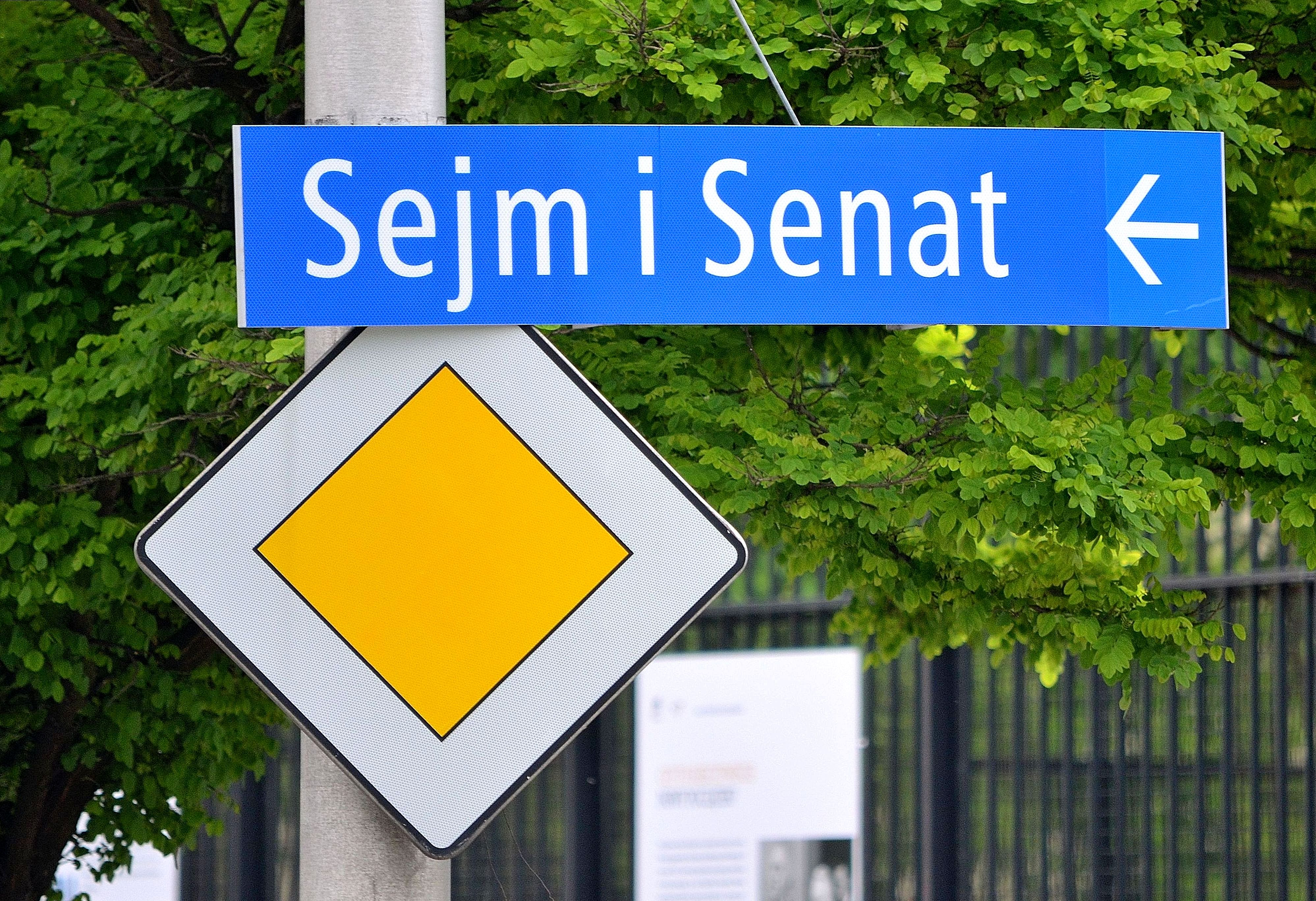
Road sign locating the Sejm and Senate Complex (Piękna Street)

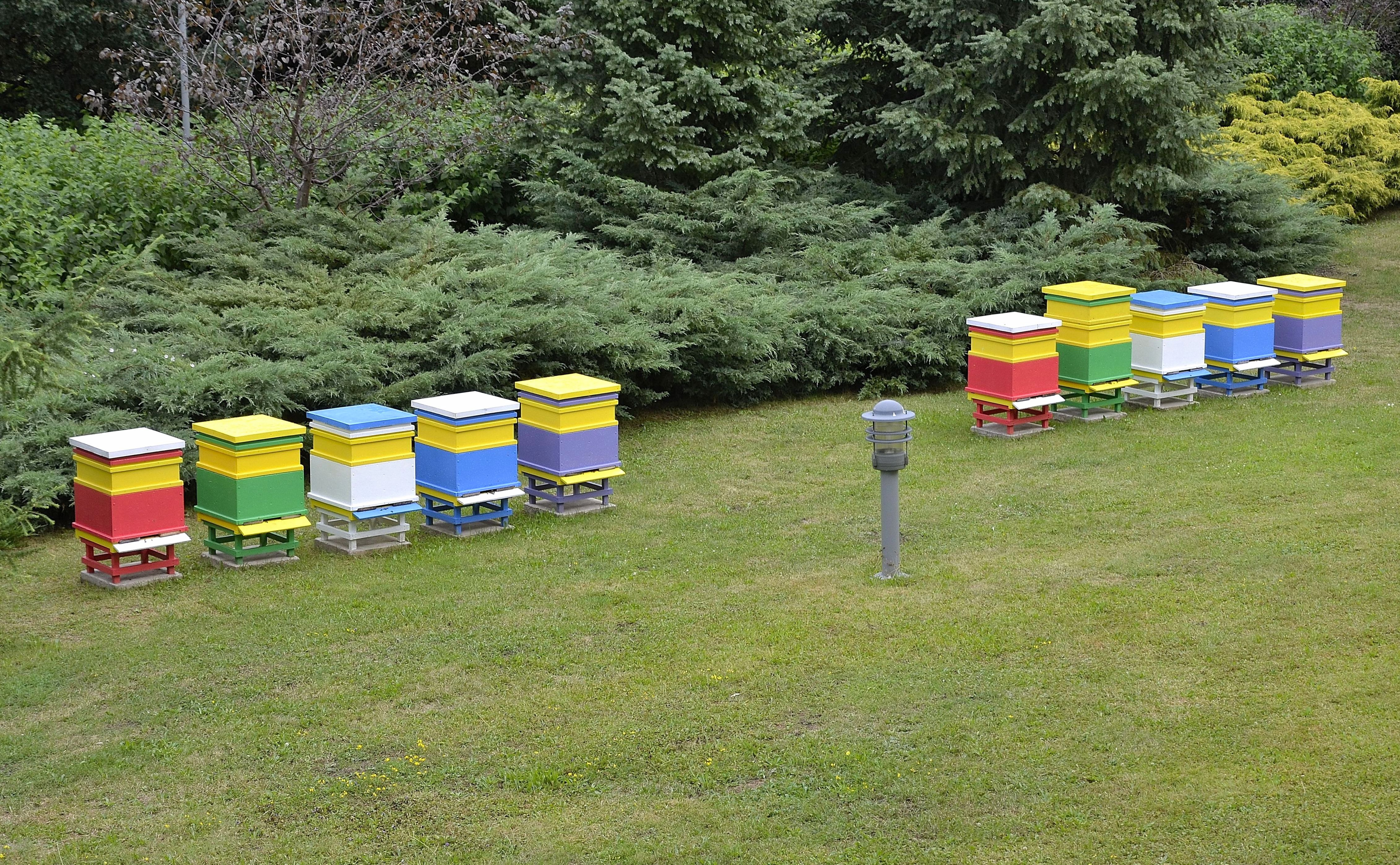
Apiary by the Senate building

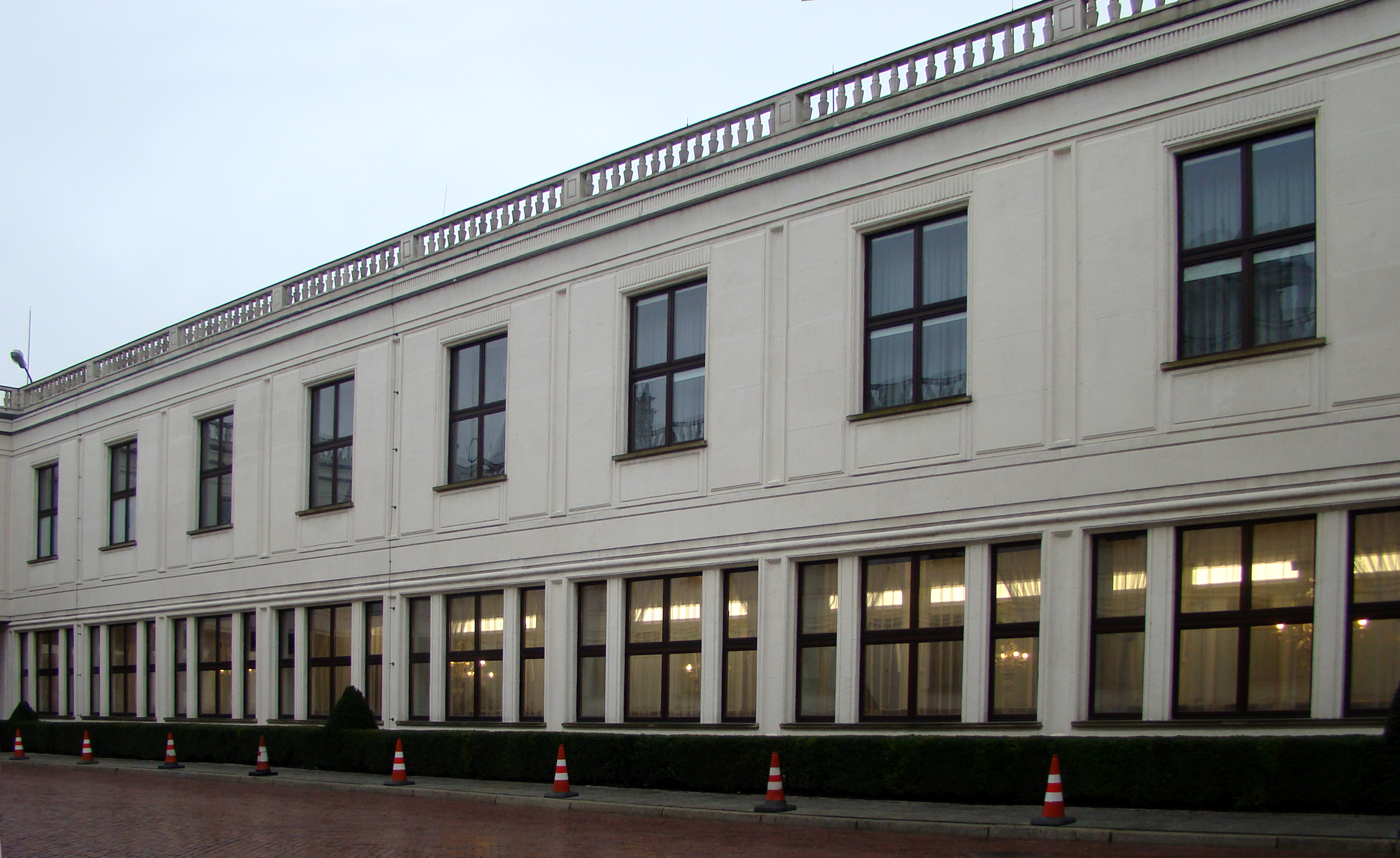
Main Sejm building

Plan of the Sejm ad Senate Complex buildings. A – Senate Meeting Hall B – administration building C, D – main Sejm building E, F – New House for Sejm Members G – Sejm Commission building H – administration building, security, bookstore I – Sejm Meeting Hall J – administration building K – administration building (Old House for Sejm Members), Sejm Commission offices, Sejm Library L, Ł – administration building N – mail sorting building
