= Workers' Defence Committee =

Polish civil society group

The Workers' Defense Committee (Polish: Komitet Obrony Robotników pronounced [kɔmitɛt ɔbrɔnɨ rɔbɔtɲikuf], KOR) was a Polish civil society group that was established to give aid to prisoners and their families after the June 1976 protests and ensuing government crackdown. It was a precursor and inspiration for efforts of the Solidarity trade union a few years later.

It was established in September 1976. A year later it was reorganized into the KOR Committee for Social Self-Defense (Komitet Samoobrony Społecznej KOR).

== History ==
The organization was the first major anti-communist civic group in Poland, as well as Eastern Europe. It was borne of the outrage at the government's crackdown on the June 1976 protests. Its stated purpose was to create "new centers of autonomous activity." It raised money through sales of its underground publications, through fund-raising groups in Paris and London, and grants from Western institutions.

KOR sent open letters of protest to the government and organized legal and financial support for the families of political detainees. The leaders of the organization established an activities and coordination center and offered analysis on workers’ conditions within Poland. They often collaborated with Western journalists on writing and publishing articles. The group worked with sympathetic lawyers to get better representation for striking workers and obtained medical diagnoses from doctors which they presented as evidence of police brutality in court trials. They smuggled in mimeograph machines to print their underground newsletter, Komunikat, which had a circulation of around 20,000 by 1978.

As a side project of KOR, an underground publishing house called NOWA was founded using mimeograph machines owned by KOR. It printed material critical of the regime and reproduced banned writings from thinkers and writers outside of the Warsaw Pact countries, such as George Orwell. NOWA had its own print shops, storehouses, and distribution network, and financed itself through sales and contributions.

In late 1977 KOR collaborated with Warsaw intellectuals to establish the Flying University, a series of lectures organized by unofficial student groups to discuss ideas about freedom that could not be debated in public. The government harassed KOR members as it did other civil society groups in Poland: beating up and jailing dissidents, infiltrating and interrupting lectures, and conducting searches of dissidents' houses. However, KOR's work eventually resulted in the Polish government declaring an amnesty for jailed strikers in early 1977. In that year, it was renamed the Committee for Social Self-defence KOR (Komitet Samoobrony Społecznej KOR).

KOR went on to publish another underground paper, Robotnik ("The Worker"—the same title as Józef Piłsudski's underground paper)

== Founding members ==
- Jerzy Andrzejewski
- Stanisław Barańczak
- Ludwik Cohn
- Jacek Kuroń
- Edward Lipiński
- Jan Józef Lipski
- Antoni Macierewicz
- Piotr Naimski
- Antoni Pajdak
- Józef Rybicki
- Aniela Steinsbergowa
- Adam Szczypiorski
- Fr. Jan Zieja
- Wojciech Ziembiński

== See also ==
- Movement for Defense of Human and Civic Rights (ROPCiO)
- Jan Krzysztof Kelus
- Committee for the Defense of the Unjustly Prosecuted - similar movement in Czechoslovakia
