= Toby Talbot =

American cinema owner, writer and translator (1928–2025)

Toby Talbot (née Tolpen, November 29, 1928 – September 15, 2025) was an American cinema owner, writer and translator. With her husband Dan Talbot, she co-founded the distribution company New Yorker Films and ran several Manhattan theaters including Lincoln Plaza Cinemas.

== Early life and education ==
Talbot was born as Toby Tolpen in the Bronx on November 29, 1928. Her parents were Jewish immigrants from Poland. Her father owned a window-washing company and her mother was a homemaker. She grew up in the Pelham Parkway section of the Bronx. She graduated from Christopher Columbus High School and went on to receive a BA in 1949 from Queens College.

== Career ==
She and her husband Dan Talbot operated four influential art-house cinemas on the Upper West Side of Manhattan. They operated the New Yorker Theater from 1960 to 1973, Cinema Studio from 1977 to 1990, the Metro Theater from 1982 to 1987, and the Lincoln Plaza Cinemas from 1981 to 2018.

In 1964, the Talbots were so impressed by a New York Film Festival screening of Before the Revolution that they launched New Yorker Films so they could release it themselves. Over the next 40 years, they distributed hundreds of films.

Talbot was the education editor of the Spanish-language newspaper El Diario Nueva York and was a Spanish literature instructor at Columbia University and New York University, taught a documentary film course at the New School, and was a Spanish teacher at East Rockaway High School in Queens.

She translated from Spanish to English the 1981 memoir of Jacobo Timerman, Prisoner Without a Name, Cell Without a Number, which detailed his experience of being kidnapped and tortured by the Argentine military junta. She was the author of several books, including the novel Early Disorder that focused on a teenager with an eating disorder, which she published in 1980 under the name Rebecca Joseph. In 1980, she wrote A Book About My Mother, a combined memoir and biography. In 2009, she published the memoir The New Yorker Theater and Other Scenes from a Life at the Movies, which has a foreword by Martin Scorsese. In 2022, after her husband's death, she edited his memoir In Love with the Movies, which has a foreword by Werner Herzog.

== Personal life and death ==
From 1951, she was married to Dan Talbot, until his death in 2017. They had three daughters.

Toby Talbot died from complications of Guillain–Barré syndrome on September 15, 2025, at the age of 96.
