= Daniel Talbot =

Daniel Talbot is the name of:

- Daniel Talbot (film distributor) (died 2017), founder of New Yorker Films
- Daniel Talbot (golfer) (born 1953), Canadian golfer
- Daniel Talbot (footballer) (born 1984), English footballer
- Daniel Talbot (athlete) (born 1991), British sprinter
