= Political prisoners in Poland =

Political prisoners in Poland and Polish territories (under the administration of other states) have existed throughout much of the 19th and 20th centuries. In the 19th century, some Polish political prisoners started using their situation of imprisonment to act politically. This phenomenon became visible as early as in the aftermath of the Greater Poland Uprising of 1848.

The Russian Empire's first socialist party, the Polish Proletariat, established a political prisoner culture and tradition in Congress Poland, and used their imprisonment as a terrain of struggle. Political prisoners also existed under the interwar Second Polish Republic, under the Nazi occupation in World War II, and in the post-war People's Republic of Poland periods.

Until the elimination of the compulsory draft in Poland in 2009, conscientious objectors to the mandatory military in Poland service continued to be imprisoned for one year, and were recognized as prisoners of conscience by Amnesty International.

== History ==
Throughout human history, people have been incarcerated for their political opinions or beliefs, and the threat they pose to the establishment.

=== Partitioned Poland ===
In the early nineteenth century, Poland was partitioned between Russia, Austria and Prussia. In those days, political offenders in Europe were usually put in prison or under house arrest temporarily. The individuals that posed the most risk to the political system were usually sentenced to exile. However, in Russian Poland, some political prisoners were imprisoned indefinitely during this period as well. Such was the case of Walerian Łukasiński, an officer who supported Polish independence and was incarcerated in 1823. He died after 46 years of solitary confinement.

Polish political prisoners played a major role in the course of the Revolutions of 1848 in the Grand Duchy of Posen, a part of the Kingdom of Prussia. The Greater Poland uprising of 1846 had been suppressed two years earlier. After the uprising, 254 Polish activists were imprisoned upon charges of conspiracy. The trial ended on 2 December 1847, when 134 of the defendants were acquitted and returned to the Duchy. Eight defendants, including Ludwik Mierosławski, were sentenced to death, while the rest were sent to the Berlin-Moabit prison. However, the death sentences were not carried out in the four following months. On 19 March 1848, after the Revolution in Berlin succeeded throughout the Spring of Nations, King Frederick William IV of Prussia declared amnesty for these Polish prisoners, who joined the Berlin Home Guard in the evening of 20 March 1848 by founding a "Polish Legion" in the courtyard of the Berliner Schloss. They were armed with weapons from the Royal Prussian Arsenal. Ludwik Mierosławski waved the Black-Red-Gold flag of the German Revolution and the prisoners were celebrated by the public.

The Berlin Trial of 1864 took place following the January Uprising in the Russian partition. Following the trial, a number of Polish activists from the German partition who supported the insurgents were imprisoned in the Magdeburg Fortress and the Grudziądz Fortress in Prussia, and were subsequently described by Polish scholars as political prisoners.

The first socialist party in the Russian Empire, the Proletariat, was founded in Poland in 1882 by Ludwik Waryński. After a series of protests, many party members were imprisoned in the 10th Pavilon of the Warsaw Citadel, where they were allowed certain privileges and liberties not experienced by regular prisoners. From prison, Proletariat continued to organize strikes and to publish a party newspaper.

Russian administration in the late 19th and early 20th century Warsaw explicitly accepted the category of a political prisoner, mostly used to contain socialists. It was in that period that political prisoners created a unique identity, culture and tradition that was mostly associated with the Polish Socialist Party. These political prisoners used their condition of imprisonment as a terrain of struggle.

=== Interwar period ===
During the era of the Second Polish Republic, the authorities reduced some of the official or unofficial rights of the political prisoners; in particular, according to Anna Machcewicz "the prison rules adopted in 1932 had the category of political prisoner deleted". During that time, the major political prison was Bereza Kartuska. From 1934 to 1939 more than half of the inmates at Bereza were described as "political prisoners". The ruling Sanacja regime of Poland started with the activists of the fascist National Radical Camp (ONR), as well as Ukrainians from the Organization of Ukrainian Nationalists (OUN), although they formed only a tiny faction of the interwar Polish political prisoners; more than the half of the inmates categorized as such were Polish communists.

=== Occupation of Poland ===
In the Holocaust, political prisoners were identified with a red triangle in Nazi concentrations camps. Most of the political prisoners imprisoned at the Auschwitz concentration camp were Poles.

=== The communist era ===
During the Stalinist era in Poland (the late 1940s to early 1950s), the communist authorities targeted a number of groups that would be recognized in prison as "political prisoners". Those included not just open or clandestine dissidents such as cursed soldiers, but also pre-war politicians, landowners, clergy, as well as members of the factions of the communist party itself who lost the internal power struggle. Many individuals were arrested on faked or trumped-up charges, with one of the most widely used and infamous laws being Paragraph 18 of the Decree of 13 June 1946 "on crimes particularly dangerous during the reconstruction of the State", which criminalized "not having informed of a crime or offence"; the clause was colloquially referred to as "knew well, didn't tell" and used to imprison individuals against whom the only evidence was an association with a controversial party (such as having left abroad or having talked to foreigners, which was often enough to have one convicted of spying for foreign powers). While the association of political prisoners (a category not officially recognized in the law) and prisoners incarcerated for the "anti-State activities" (a legal category that existed at that time) is imperfect, Machcewicz stated that the number of political prisoners as a part of the entirety of convict population was significant, although less than half of the total and likely included tens of thousands of people, mostly men. Main political prisons of that time included Fordon Prison in Bydgoszcz for women, and Rawicz Prison and Wronki Prison for men, and initially the authorities worked based on the idea that political prisoners are irreformable and dangerous and need to be isolated from the rest of the prisoner population; however due the large number of political prisoners in the system, most were distributed throughout various penal facilities in the country, and isolation was not strictly enforced except for the small group of most "serious" cases such as members of the armed resistance such as the National Armed Forces. At the same time, as the Stalinist era was drawing to a close, many political prisoners imprisoned for less serious charges were released under a series of amnesties, ending with the amnesty of 27 April 1956. which saw almost all political prisoners of that era released.

The amnesties of the 1950s did not, however, end the practice of the communist government arresting dissidents for political reasons. For example, Adam Michnik, imprisoned by the Polish communist government in the 1960s and 1980s, has been called "one of Poland's most famous political prisoners". The Amnesty International Report for 1985 noted that "according to official sources", in 1984 (three years after the martial law in Poland was introduced, seeing many dissidents arrested) there were 660 political prisoners in Poland, most of them meeting the Amnesty International classifications for prisoners of conscience; it also noted that while a number of political prisoners were released under various amnesties, new ones continued to be arrested. Repressions, including arrests and imprisonment of dissidents, continued until the end of the decade.

As a result of additional amnesties in the second half of 1980s, the prison population in Poland dropped by nearly two thirds; many of the released individuals were political prisoners; the liberalization of political life in Poland led to the Round Table Negotiations in 1989 between the government and the dissidents. Following those negotiations and the restoration of democratic government in Poland, the era of political prisoners in Poland came to an end in 1989, the year marking the fall of communism in much of Central and Eastern Europe. The final two amnesties in Poland of that era, in April and May 1989, pardoned all individuals guilty of "political crimes". Those amnesties also resulted in the lifting of United States sanctions on Poland later in 1990.

=== Prisoners of conscience after 1989 ===
Even after the fall of communism and transition of the Polish government to a democratic one, for the next several years, Amnesty International recognized a number of conscientious objectors to military service, imprisoned in Poland, as prisoners of conscience, noting that every year, several people are sentenced to one-year imprisonment for refusing to serve in the military. Compulsory conscription in Poland was eliminated in 2009.

== Code ==
Like most groups of prisoners, Polish political prisoners developed their own code as early as the 19th century. One of its main elements was to deny any affiliations with other individuals and organizations, as to prevent repercussions to one's friends and allies.

== Treatment ==
During the eras of partitions of Poland (under the Russian regime) and in interwar Poland, certain unofficial rules became a habit in prisons hosting Polish political prisoners. They afforded certain privileges to them that were not extended to the traditional criminal inmates, such as being able to use their own clothes, more frequently being able to exchange letters, talk to inmates from other cells and to access the prison library, and even held gatherings where they could lecture and hold political discussions. Their unofficial organizations were more frequently tolerated, and in some cases, they even were able to successfully demand the right to education or to be exempted from heavy labour. They were however also explicitly denied certain rights, such as the ability to submit a jointly signed petition.

During the Stalinist era, however, political prisoners were treated much more harshly than their criminal counterparts. Particularly the ones who refused to cooperate with the authorities and show remorse were subject to "hardly bearable isolation, brutal oppression, and permanent ideological pressure". The prisoners who broke down and have been recognized as having "quit fighting and [having] assumed a passive attitude" were treated in a way similar to that in which regular (criminal) prisoners were; and their "better" treatment was in fact purposefully shown to those who still resisted, as a form of an incentive. In either case, many political prisoners have suffered from maltreatment of various sorts, and upon their release have been described as "physically infirm and psychically crippled".

== Remembrance ==
The topic of political prisoners was not allowed to be researched by the communist authorities; however, in 1981, Czesław Leopold and Krzysztof Lechicki published an underground book about this topic in Poland.

An NGO, the Association of Political Prisoners of the Stalinist Era (Związek Więźniów Politycznych Okresu Stalinowskiego), was founded in Poland in 1990. In 1995 it published a collection of poems by Polish political prisoners, Przeciwko złu. Wiersze i piosenki więzienne 1944–1956 (Against evil. Prison poems and songs 1944–1956), including works by poets such as Barbara Otwinowska, Irena Tomalak and Jerzy Braun.

== Notable examples ==
=== Russian Empire period ===
- Warsaw Citadel
- Ludwik Waryński, imprisoned by the Russian Empire in the second half of the 19th century

=== Interwar period (1918-1939) ===
- Bereza Kartuska Prison

=== Polish People's Republic (1945-1989) ===
- Fordon Prison in BydgoszczRawicz Prison and Wronki Prison, communist era
- Adam Michnik, described as one of the most famous political prisoners of the communist era

== See also ==
- Dissident movement in the People's Republic of Poland
