= Dissident movement in the Polish People's Republic =

Polish political movement

The dissident movement in the Polish People's Republic was a political movement in the Polish People's Republic (predecessor of the modern Republic of Poland, Polish: Polska Rzeczpospolita Ludowa, PRL) whose aim was to overthrow the Polish Workers Party and free Poland from Soviet influence.

== Historical background ==
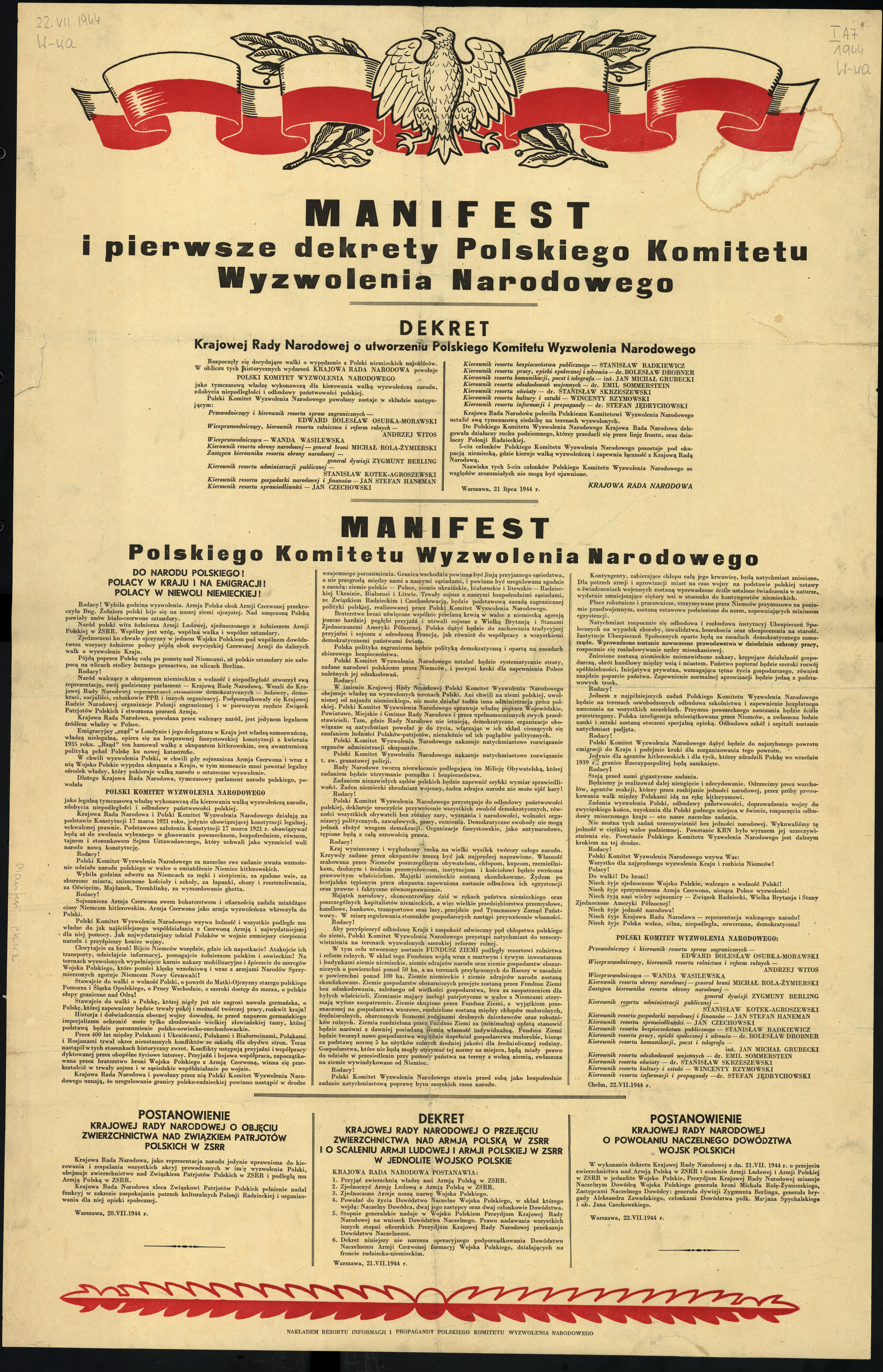
The PKWN Manifesto, officially issued on 22 July 1944.

One of the deciding points in post World War II history was the Yalta Conference where decisions regarding postwar Europe were taken and the continent became divided with the Iron Curtain. As a result, Poland remained under the Soviet Union's dominance. Formally was a separate country, in reality it couldn't make independent decisions without Moscow's approval. The power was held by the Polish United Workers' Party (Polska Zjednoczona Partia Robotnicza, PZPR). The party stayed in power not because of the social support but because of suppressing society and military support from Moscow. The ties with the Soviet Union were declared through the PKWN Manifesto where the legitimacy of the coming State National Council, a Soviet-backed administration was announced.

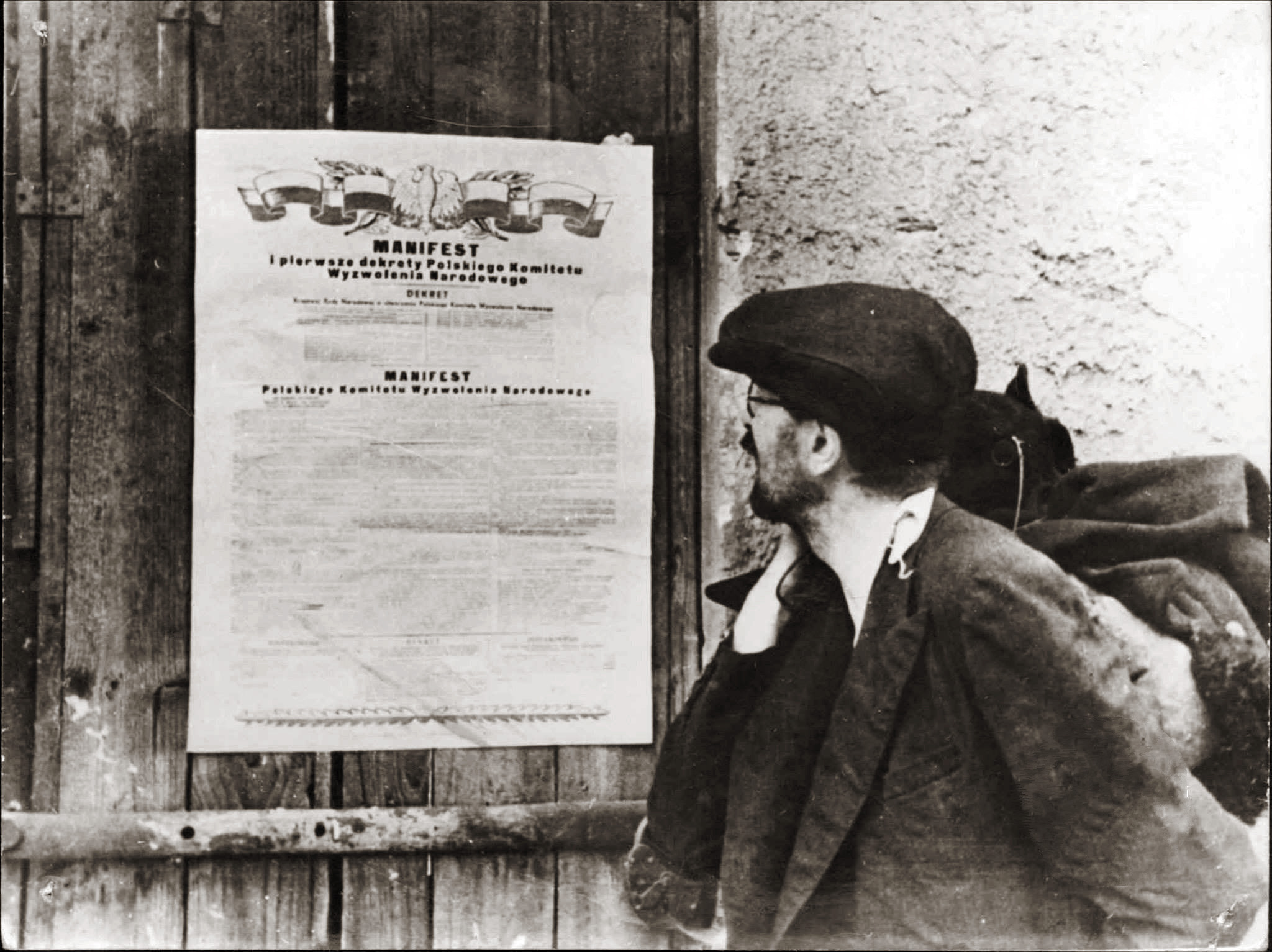
A citizen reads the PKWN Manifesto (of the Polish Committee of National Liberation), July 22, 1944 - a symbolic photo of the communist propaganda, copied in numerous books.

During that time many citizens were working in government-owned companies, managed by people approved by the authorities, often as a result of political decisions. Their influence of a communistic rule was far beyond that. The economy was centrally planned, with all the prices and amount of the goods on the market regulated by the government officials. That time standing in the queues to purchase basic goods were part of daily life for all the residents. The government also interfered in people's personal life. There was no place for fundamental rights. People could gather to assembly or create their party, the PZPR was the only legal one. Censorship was imposed, atheism was strongly promoted, surveillance and invigilation were widely spread by eavesdropping on telephone conversations, violating the confidentiality of the correspondence, and spying. The Ministry of Public Security (Ministerstwo Bezpieczeństwa Publicznego) with Security Services (Służba Bezpieczństwa, SB) is a representation of such actions that aimed to espy and eradicate anti-communist structures. The example of the repressions towards anti-communist activists can be a history of Polish general Leopold Okulicki and the Trial of the Sixteen. It's hard to estimate those hurt or killed by the actions directed by the communistic government. The changes in the Constitution of Poland were introduced and the Constitution of the Polish People's Republic passed in 1952. The changes included the new name of the country, the Polish People's Republic (Polska Rzeczpospolita Ludowa, PRL), the Polish Council of State replaced the office of the President of Poland, the Polish United Workers' Party (PZPR) became constitutionally a source of highest power, and other. Changes started to appear in the fifties due to the growing public resistance and some following circumstances. In 1953 Joseph Stalin died, his death initiated a 'thaw’ period in Soviet Union and other dependent, communistic countries. The cult of personality started to be condemned and terror lessened. Another factor influencing the situation in Poland was the mysterious death of its president Bolesław Bierut in 1956.

=== Beginnings of the dissident movements ===
Imposed political system and constant suppression influenced people's lives. Million people were arrested, thousands became fatal victims of the terror, Security Service (SB) investigated millions of people. Citizens, including workers started to rise their voices regarding constantly violated human rights and overall discontent. People called for reforms. In June 1956 the worker's strike in Poznań took place and gathered over 100 000 people. The strike met a brutal response from the government, resulting in up to hundred deaths. It was a beginning of the changes that were about to happen. At the beginning, even though the Władysław Gomułka became a new communistic leader in the Polish People's Republic. He had a support of the society as none person before. the country didn't manage to gain the political and economic independence from SSSR. After Władysław Gomułka took power, the community hoped for the lessening restrictions. However, the restrictions didn't stop, including the censorship of the culture what resulted in students' protest in 1968. Further protests escalated, in December 1970 workers in northern Poland are protesting because of the increase in meat prices. The protests of 1970 were bloodily suppressed by the militia and the army resulting in deaths of 45 people, approximately 1165 casualties and around 146 people being arrested. Due to further incidents, people didn't want a reformation of the system, they started calling for changing the system. Because of the social disapprove, the authorities in Poland changed, though the communistic system still remained. Seventies were the years when quality of the life has improved and on the market you could find more and more foreign goods. Due to credits development was possible but the result wasn't the one expected. Factories and public services began to be modernized, stores equipped with local goods. The government managed by Edward Gierek (leader of Poland between 1970 and 1980) run into severe debt. In 1978 Bank of England they warned that PRL would not be able to repay the loans. However, the decade ended with the recession, development backed up by the loans was only effective for a short time. The loans that the government then took, were paid back in 2012. The decade ensured how the communistic system is inefficient and the following recession caused a series of strikes (described in the currents of dissidence paragraph).

=== Influence of religion ===
Important role in fighting communism had a common religion of the Polish society. Over 90% of the society defined themselves as Catholics. Religion is thought to be something that brought people together giving hope and a feeling of participation. After World War II authorities continuously run Polish anti-religious campaign aimed at (inter alia) the Catholic Church in Poland. In 1956 the limitations were eased and the Church leaders became more active in the society with cardinal Stefan Wyszyński in the lead. 1966 was an important year for Polish citizens, country celebrated the Millennium of the Polish State and at the same 1000 years of the Christianization of Poland. The anniversary was used by both the church and the ruling party for the propaganda purposes. Communistic government wanted to focus on the celebration without the religious context presenting it as the Millennium of the Polish State. On the other hand, the Catholic Church wanted to underline the relationship between Catholicism and the Polish State and their common origins since establishment of the Polish State started from the baptism. Not only Catholic Church in Poland was confronted. The communistic government aimed their actions towards other religions including Jewish Community in Poland, resulting in migration of thousands of them.

== Groups of dissidence ==
- The Workers' Defence Committee (Komitet Obrony Robotników, KOR)
- Movement of Young Poland (Ruch Młodej Polski)
- Students' Solidarity Committees (Studenckie Komitety Solidarności)
- Movement for Defense of Human and Civil Rights (Ruch Obrony Praw Człowieka i Obywatela, ROBCiO)
- Free Trade Unions of the Coast (Wolne Związki Zawodowe Wybrzeża, WZZW)

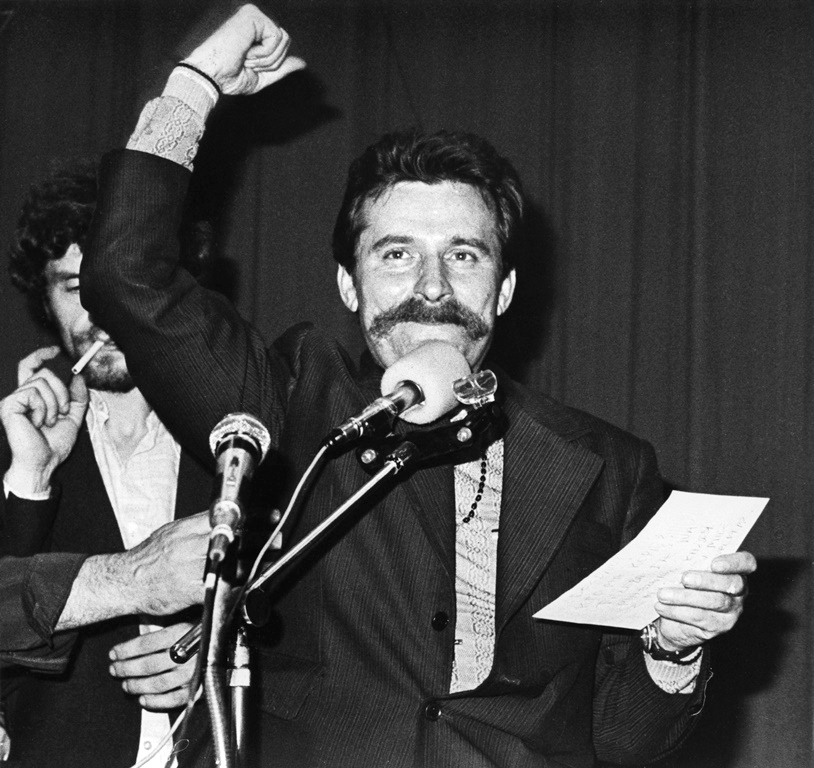
Lech Wałęsa, anti-communist opposition leader, during the August strikes

== Currents of dissidence ==
=== Strikes ===
In June 1976 the plan for raising goods' prices was revealed. The decision was motivated by the worsening economic situation in the Polish People's Republic. The raise would include basic commodities and influence significantly budget of the Polish households. It resulted in a social dissatisfaction and a series of large-scale social demonstrations, named June 1976 protests. As a part of the preparation, the government trained Motorized Reserves of the Citizens' Militia (Zmotoryzowane Odwody Milicji Obywatelskiej, ZOMO) - elite units of Citizens' Militia (MO) to quell demonstrations. The information about the increase resulted in protests starting the next day on 25 June 1976. The government expected the riots to be focused in bigger cities such as Warsaw, Krakow, Szczecin, Gdansk, or Upper Silesia. However, the protests centers were Radom, Warsaw's suburb of Ursus, and Płock. After a few days of riots, the government decided to take back the decision and the news regarding riots were suppressed. However, the participants faced big repressions with legal charges, years in prison, or being beaten including those in need of hospitalization. Because of the continuing economic crisis, the government introduced ration stamps (Kartki). From 1976 "kartki" were necessary for everyone to buy even basic products.

=== Formation of a dissidence ===
After World War II, the communist system allowed trade unions (after 1939, under German occupation those were prohibited). Originally planned as an instrument of the Polish United Workers' Party (PZPR) to prevent for instance solidarity movements, later met with resistance of the participants, resulting in many further confrontations and strikes. In September 1976 group of intellectuals founded the Workers' Defence Committee (Komitet Obrony Robotników, KOR). Its main goal was to provide financial, legal, and medical support to those repressed by the government after demonstrations or another form of dissidence. The group was also gathering signatures to release people from detention and was raising funds for the affected families by the disciplinary dismissals. Hunger-strikes became their common form of pressuring the authorities.

==== Murder of Stanisław Pyjas ====
Stanisław Pyjas, a student cooperating with KOR was murdered in May 1977. His death agitated the society and caused a series of protests resulting in furthers arrests. In many cities students' KOR committees started appearing. In the end, the government ceased persecution and declared an amnesty for the participants the riots.

==== KOR reorganization and ROBCiO creation ====
In 1977 the Workers' Defence Committee was reorganized into the Committee for Social Self-defence (Komitet Samoobrony Społecznej KOR). Further development of the committee was motivated by the lack of support for repressed people from the national organizations designated for that. The goal of the committee was to put an initiative for different forms of defense. Their aim was also to provide information about the persecutions as they have perceived revealing the actions of the authorities to the public the only effective way of defense where Zofia Romaszewska and her husband Zbigniew Romaszewski held significant actions. They coordinated and registered the cases of humans rights violations in Poland and spread the information to the world. On 25 March 1977 the Movement for Defense of Human and Civic Rights (Ruch Obrony Praw Człowieka i Obywatela, ROPCiO) was established. Both of those organizations supported creating independent workers' unions. Members of the ROBCiO co-organized the underground press called another circulation (Polish: drugi obieg) and published several magazines, books, leaflets. Created by students Independent Publishing House NOWA (Polish: Niezależna Oficyna Wydawnicza NOWA) became the largest publisher in Communist Poland. In 1979 Leszek Moczulski created Confederation of Independent Poland (Konfederacja Polski Niepodległej KPN). It was the first one anti-communistic party in the Eastern Communist Bloc.

==== Winter of 1978/1979 ====
The winter of 1978/1979 was extreme and showed how inefficient the government was even when dealing with natural occurrences. Besides the large amount of snow, temperatures went down to -30 degrees Celsius. For almost a month factories were unable to operate. The government was calling citizens for help. Although they tried to introduce some solutions, their efforts were unsuccessful.

==== Pope John Paul II ====
On 16 October 1978 Polish Cardinal Karol Wojtyła was elected pope. He took the name Pope John Paul II. Since most of the society was Catholic, the election of a Pole as pope raised hope in the Polish community. The Pope also supported anti-communist narrative which caused concern among communists. The authorities of the USSR expressed opposition to the Pope's visit to Poland, however, Edward Gierek allowed the Pope to make a pilgrimage to Poland in June 1979. About 6 million people took part in the visit. Joint prayers helped Poles see how much strength they had together.

== See also ==
- Political prisoners in Poland
- Soviet dissidents

== Bibliography ==
1. Fehér, Ferenc (1987). "Eastern Europe's Long Revolution against Yalta". East European Politics and Societies and Cultures. 2: 1–34. doi:10.1177/0888325488002001001. S2CID 144902712.
2. Osmańczyk, Edmund (2003), Encyclopedia of the United Nations and International Agreements: G to M, Taylor & Francis, ISBN 978-0-415-93922-5
