= Political prisoner =

Someone imprisoned for their political activity

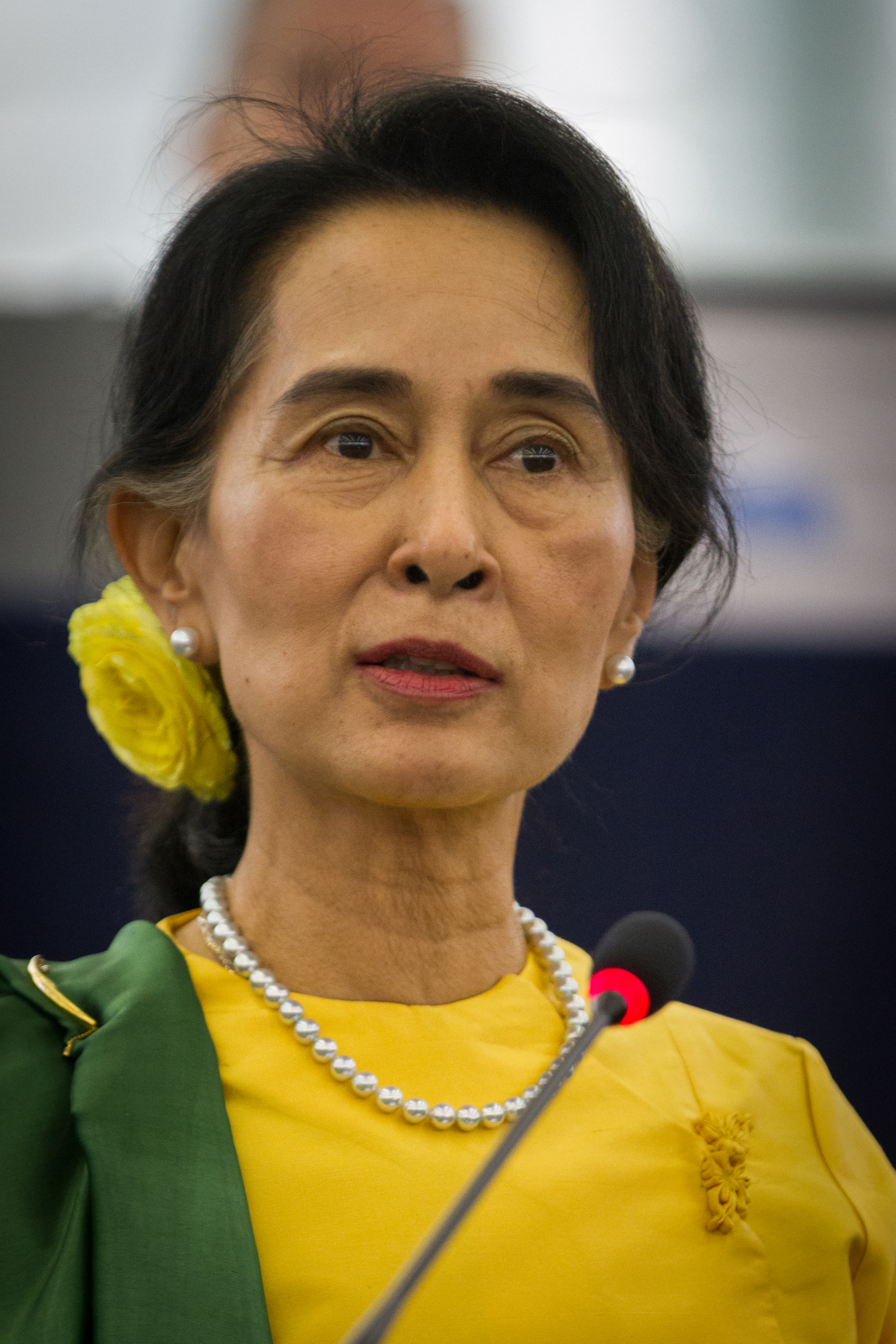
Aung San Suu Kyi

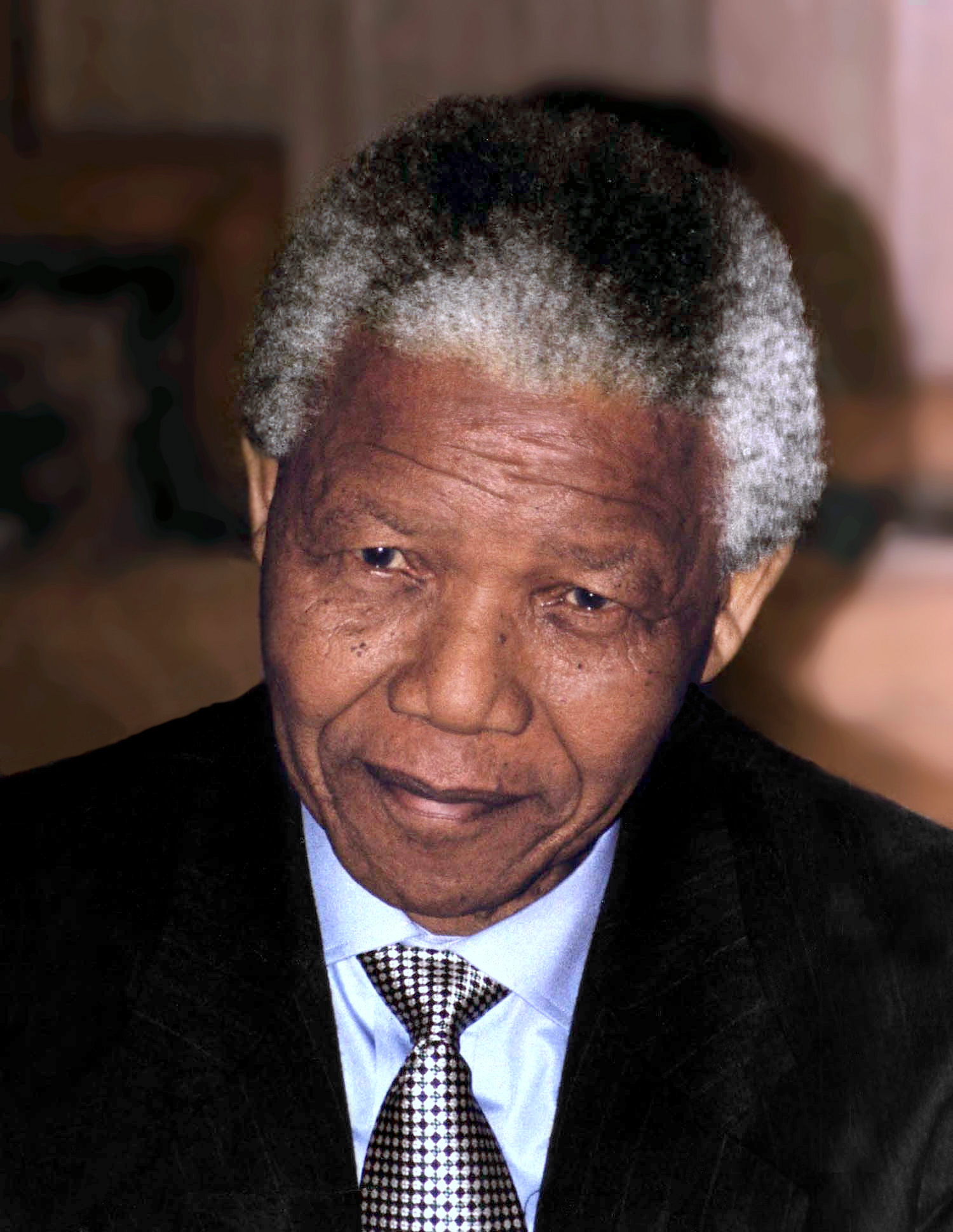
Nelson Mandela

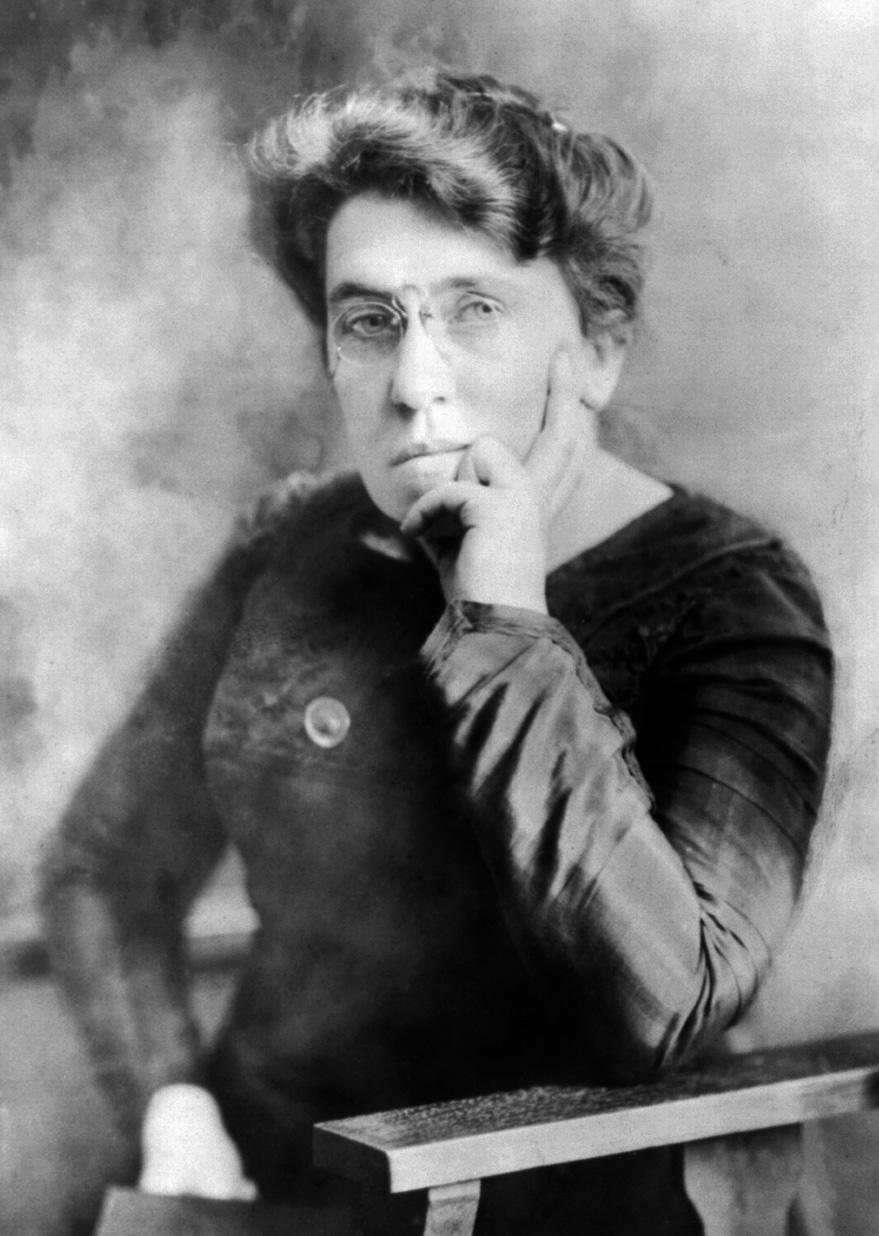
Emma Goldman

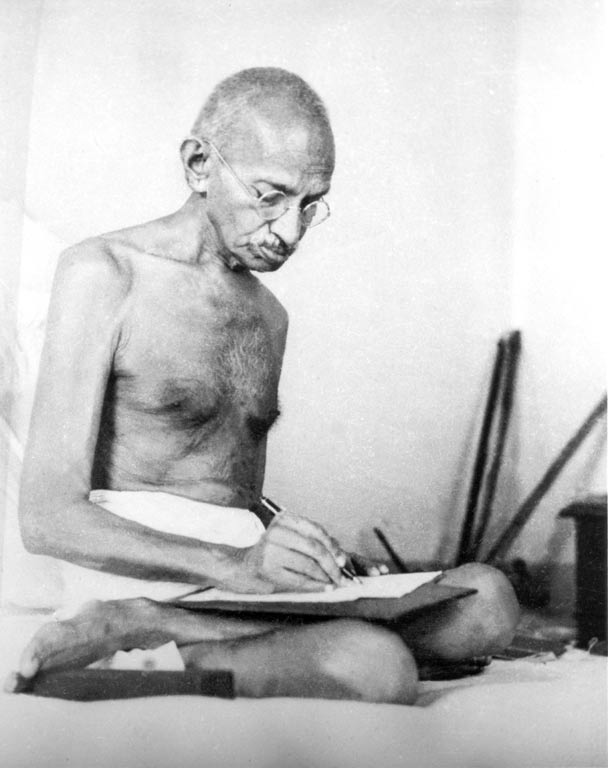
Mahatma Gandhi

A political prisoner is someone imprisoned for their political activity. The political offense is not always the official reason for the prisoner's detention.

There is no internationally recognized legal definition of the concept, although numerous similar definitions have been proposed by various organizations and scholars, and there is a general consensus among scholars that "individuals have been sanctioned by legal systems and imprisoned by political regimes not for their violation of codified laws but for their thoughts and ideas that have fundamentally challenged existing power relations". The status of a political prisoner is generally awarded to individuals based on the declarations of non-governmental organizations like Amnesty International, on a case-by-case basis. While such statuses are often widely recognized by the international public, they are often rejected by individual governments accused of holding political prisoners, which tend to deny any bias in their judicial systems.

A related term is prisoner of conscience (POC), popularized by Amnesty International. It describes someone who was prosecuted because of their personal beliefs.

Some prisons, known as political prisons, are accustomed to or are designed solely for hosting political prisoners.

== Definitions ==
The concept of a political prisoner, like many concepts in social sciences, sports numerous definitions, and is undefined in international law and human right treaties. Helen Taylor Greene and Shaun L. Gabbidon in 2009 that "standard legal definitions have remained elusive", but at the same time, observing that there is a general consensus that "individuals have been sanctioned by legal systems and imprisoned by political regimes not for their violation of codified laws but for their thoughts and ideas that have fundamentally challenged existing power relations".

A number of organizations involved in human rights issues, as well as scholars studying them, have developed their own definitions, some of which are presented below.

=== Organizations ===
==== Amnesty International ====
Amnesty International (AI) campaigns for the release of prisoners of conscience, which include both political prisoners as well as those imprisoned for their religious or philosophical beliefs. To reduce controversy, and as a matter of principle, the organization's policy applies only to prisoners who have not committed or advocated violence. Thus, there are political prisoners who do not fit the narrower criteria for POCs. The organisation defines the differences as follows:

AI uses the term "political prisoner" broadly. It does not use it, as some others do, to imply that all such prisoners have a special status or should be released. It uses the term only to define a category of prisoners for whom AI demands a fair and prompt trial.

In AI's usage, the term includes any prisoner whose case contains a significant political element, in regard to the motivation of the prisoner's acts, the acts themselves, or the motivation of the authorities.

"Political" is used by AI to refer to aspects of human relations related to "politics": the mechanisms of society and civil order, the principles, organization, or conduct of government or public affairs, and the relation of all these to questions of language, ethnic origin, sex or religion, status, or influence (among other factors).

The category of political prisoners embraces the category of prisoners of conscience, the only prisoners who AI demands should be immediately and unconditionally released, as well as people who resort to criminal violence for a political motive.

In AI's use of the term, here are some examples of political prisoners:

- a person accused or convicted of an ordinary crime carried out for political motives, such as murder or robbery carried out to support the objectives of an opposition group;
- a person accused or convicted of an ordinary crime committed in a political context, such as at a demonstration by a trade union or a peasants' organization;
- a member or suspected member of an armed opposition group who has been charged with treason or "subversion".

Governments often say they have no political prisoners, only prisoners held under the normal criminal law. AI however describes cases like the examples given above as "political" and uses the terms "political trial" and "political imprisonment" when referring to them. But by doing so, AI does not oppose the imprisonment, except where it further maintains that the prisoner is a prisoner of conscience, or condemn the trial, except where it concludes that it was unfair.

==== Parliamentary Assembly of the Council of Europe ====
The Parliamentary Assembly of the Council of Europe has the following definition:

A person deprived of their personal liberty is to be regarded as a 'political prisoner':

1. if the detention has been imposed in violation of one of the fundamental guarantees set out in the European Convention on Human Rights and its Protocols, in particular freedom of thought, conscience and religion, freedom of expression and information, freedom of assembly and association;
2. if the detention has been imposed for purely political reasons without connection to any offence;
3. if, for political motives, the length of the detention or its conditions are clearly out of proportion to the offence the person has been found guilty of or is suspected of;
4. if, for political motives, he or she is detained in a discriminatory manner as compared to other persons; or,
5. if the detention is the result of proceedings which were clearly unfair and this appears to be connected with political motives of the authorities.

==== Assistance Association for Political Prisoners ====
Burmese Assistance Association for Political Prisoners defines a political prisoner as "anyone who is arrested because of [their] perceived or real involvement in or supporting role in opposition movements with peaceful or resistance means".

==== Congressional-Executive Commission on China ====
The US Congressional-Executive Commission on China defines a political prisoner broadly as any individual who is detained for exercising their "human rights under international law, such as peaceable assembly, freedom of religion, freedom of association, free expression, including the freedom to advocate peaceable social or political change, and to criticize government policy or government officials."

=== Academics ===
==== Steinert (2020) ====
Christoph Valentin Steinert, who in 2020 reviewed 366 definitions of political prisoners used in (mainly English language) academic literature in 1956 and 2019, argued that any definition of political prisoner needs to avoid focusing on prisoners' individual motivations and that the term "should be exclusively reserved for victims of politically biased trials" (in other words, "victims of state repression"), to avoid delegitimizing the term by diluting it with applications to prisoners of any possibly politically motivated action (which on the extreme end of the spectrum would include, for example, Ku Klux Klanners, neo-Nazis, and jihadist terrorists). He specifically criticizes definitions of political prisoners as "individuals imprisoned for politically motivated actions" or "committing a political offense". He proposed the following definition:

Political prisoners are defined as individuals that are convicted and incarcerated in politically biased trials (or executive decisions in the absence of any trials). Trials are deemed politically biased if they are endorsed by the government and (a) lack a domestic legal basis, (b) violate principles of procedural justice, or (c) violate universal human rights.

Steinert noted that his definition does extend to prisoners "imprisoned for nonpolitical identities such as their religious beliefs or their sexual orientations", as well as individuals engaged in violent actions, arguing that the neutral "classification as a political prisoner neither entails an a priori judgment about the moral legitimacy of prisoners' actions nor does it imply that individuals committed politically motivated crimes".

=== Other aspects ===
The purpose of political prisons and of imprisoning dissidents is to demonstrate the strength of the regime to the dissidents. The regime's opponents are isolated, and stigmatised, frequently abused, and tortured. The goal of such treatment is not just to punish those opposing the regime, but to frighten those who consider opposing the regime by demonstrating the power of the regime by sending a clear warning that objecting is not tolerated, and that the regime is well prepared and ready to punish the objectors through the creation of total institutions dedicated to hosting political prisoners.

The status of a political prisoner is conveyed to one only after their detention. Before that, potential political prisoners may be referred to as "dissidents, revolutionaries, social reformers, or radical thinkers". The nature of the behavior that leads to political imprisonment is hard to define and can be roughly described as any "activity deemed questionable by ruling elites". Therefore, political prisoners may be officially detained and sentenced for a multitude of different transgressions, rather than a single well-defined crime. Political prisoners are frequently arrested and tried with a veneer of legality where false criminal charges, manufactured evidence, and unfair trials (kangaroo courts, show trials) are used to disguise the fact that an individual is a political prisoner. For example, AAPP states that "the motivation behind the arrest of every individual in AAPP's database is political, regardless of the laws they have been sentenced under". This is common in situations which may otherwise be decried nationally and internationally as a human rights violation or suppression of a political dissident. Steinert notes that "objective evidence about politically biased imprisonments is chronically sparse considering that governments face substantial incentives to hide repressive practices". As a rule, governments deny imprisoning individuals for their political activities. The evaluation if a prisoner is a political prisoner can depend on political bias of the judiciary.

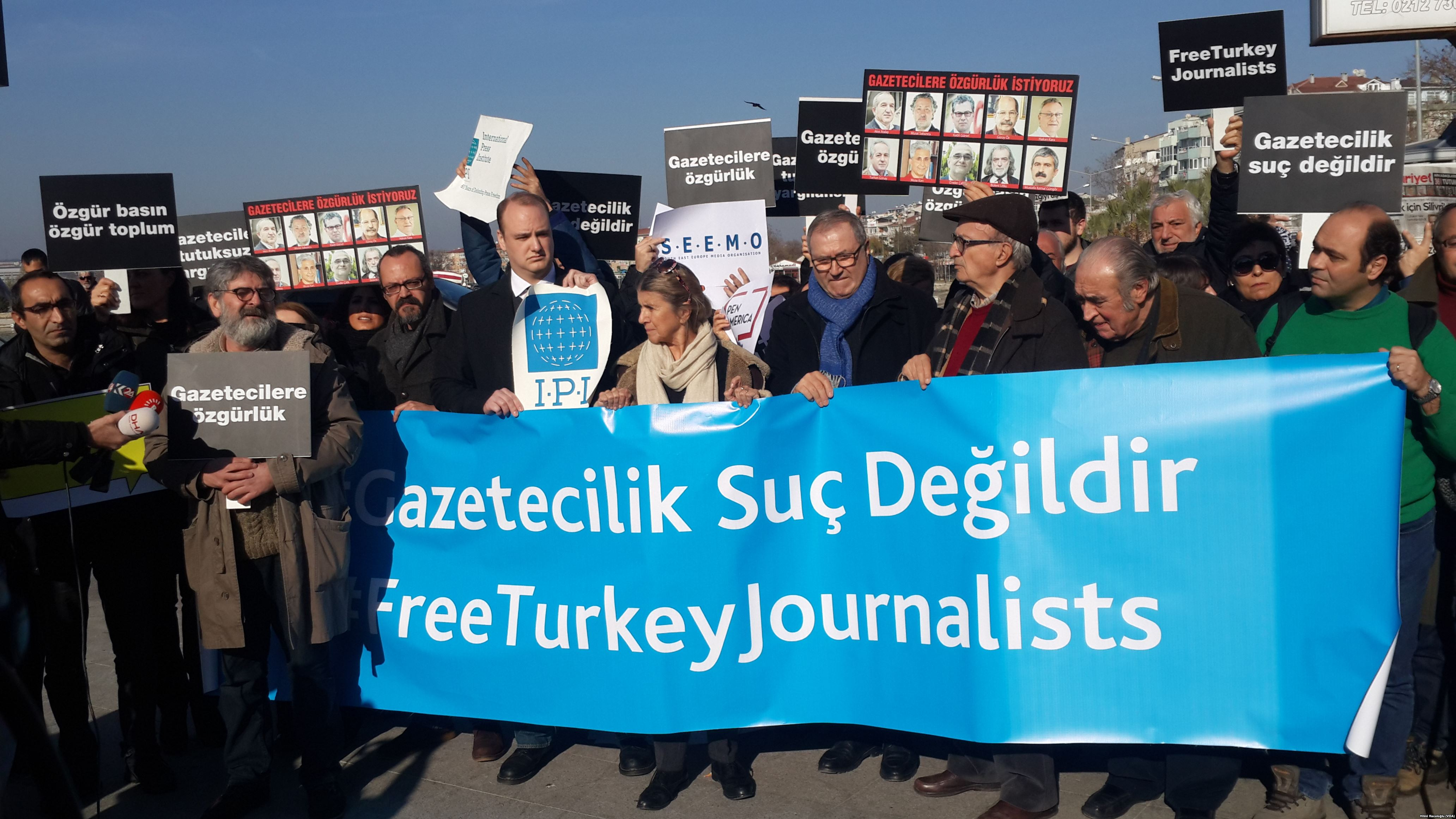
Turkish journalists protesting imprisonment of their colleagues on Human Rights Day, 10 December 2016

A political prisoner can also be someone who has been denied bail unfairly, denied parole when it would reasonably have been given to a prisoner charged with a comparable crime, or special powers may be invoked by the judiciary. Particularly in this latter situation, whether an individual is regarded as a political prisoner may depend upon the subjective political perspective or interpretation of the evidence. Political prisoners can also be imprisoned with no legal veneer by extrajudicial processes or even through executive decisions in the absence of any trials or charges. Some political prisoners need not be imprisoned at all, as they can be subject to prolonged pre-trial detainment instead. Steinert noted that technically, political detainees should be distinguished from political prisoners, but they are often grouped together, and in practical terms, he recommends treating them as special types of political prisoners. Examples of such detainees can include individuals such as the former Nobel Peace Prize Laureate Aung San Suu Kyi, detained for many years without a trial. Likewise, supporters of Tibetan spiritual leader Gedhun Choekyi Nyima in the 11th Panchen Lama controversy have called him a "political prisoner", despite the fact that he is not accused of a political offense. He is held under secluded house arrest.

Political prisoners may become the subjects of international advocacy and receive aid from various non-governmental organizations. Criticism from the international public opinion has been shown to facilitate the release of political detainees, or reduce their sentences, but is less effective in securing the release of already-sentenced individuals. When the status of political prisoner is well known, it can be seen as a form of status symbol. Some political prisoners purposefully frame themselves as "the imprisoned martyrs and leaders of their movement." Which can safeguard their well-being in prison.

== History ==
Ancient Greek philosopher Socrates has been described as perhaps the earliest known political prisoner; imprisoned for allegedly "poisoning" the minds of Grecian youth through his critique of Athenian society and its rulers. Early Christians, including Jesus Christ, and St. Peter, have also been described as such. Another famous historical figure described as a political prisoner is the 15th century French heroine, Joan of Arc, whose final charge of heresy was seen as a legal justification for her real crime of "inconveniencing the elites".

Padraic Kenney noted that "the emergence of modern political prisoners coincides with a fifty-year period (1860s–1910s) during which [modern] political movements matured around the world", also defining such movements as having "clearly articulated political and social programs" which forced the governments to develop a specific response to such movements (a response which often involved incarceration rather than dialogue, particularly under the less liberal regimes).

In some places, political prisoners had their own customs, traditions, and semi-formal organizations and privileges; historically, this has been more common up to around the interwar period, as the many political prisoners came from higher social classes (in particular, nobility), and authorities often treated them better than common criminals. This changed with the emergence of the totalitarian regimes that were intent on annihilating the opposition.

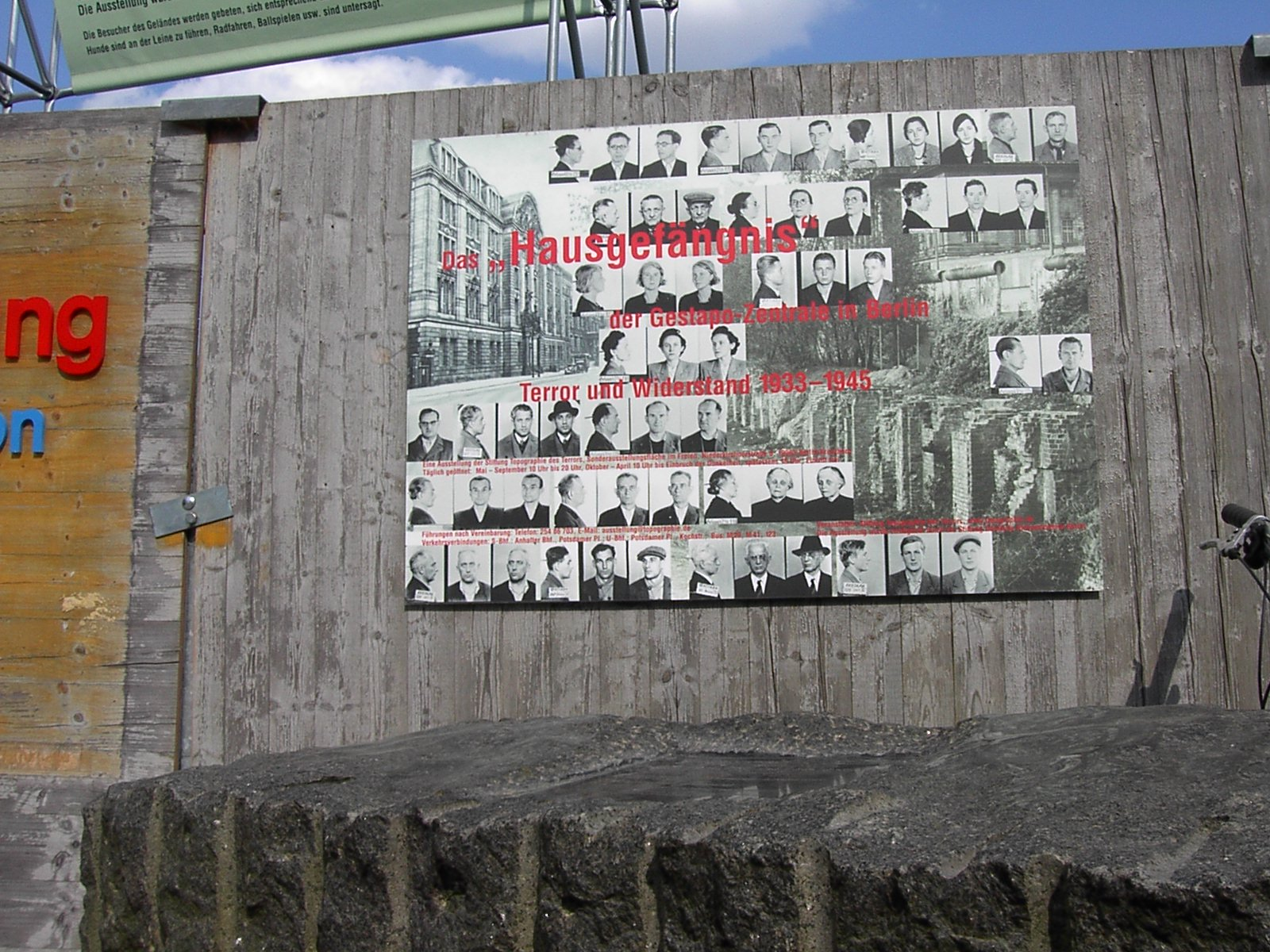
Images of political prisoners from the Gestapo archives, Germany

In Poland, the concept and even traditions of political prisoners emerged around the second half of the 19th century in the Russian partition.

While the Universal Declaration of Human Rights of 1948 is not legally binding, it is generally recognized as "a common standard of achievement for all peoples and all nations". Of particular relevance to political prisoners are its Articles 5, 6, 9 and 18. The UDHR and the later Helsinki Accords of 1975 have been used by a number of nongovernmental organizations as the basis for arguing that some governments are in fact holding political prisoners.

In the United States, the term political prisoner has been used during the mid-20th century civil rights struggle and has been occasionally applied to individuals like Rosa Parks or Martin Luther King Jr., and later used for individuals imprisoned for objecting to US involvement in the Vietnam War.

Political prisoners sometimes write memoirs of their experiences and resulting insights. Some of these memoirs have become important political texts. For example, King's "Letter From a Birmingham City Jail" has been described as "one of the most important historical documents penned by a modern political prisoner".

== Advocacy ==
A number of nongovernmental organizations focus on advocacy for political prisoners. The most prominent of those is Amnesty International, founded in 1961.

== Notable political prisoners ==
=== Groups ===
- In the Soviet Union, dubious psychiatric diagnoses were sometimes used to confine political prisoners in the so-called "psikhushkas".
- In Nazi Germany, Marxists and social democrats were among the first victims of fascist repression, later groups included the "Night and Fog" prisoners and priests.
- In the United States, African-American activists such as the Wilmington Ten (which included Benjamin Chavis), have been wrongfully imprisoned.
- Approximately 3,600 British and Irish convicts were sent to Australia in the 1700–1800s.
- According to human rights groups, there are some 60,000 political prisoners in Egypt.
- The 15 July 2016 failed coup attempt in Turkey led to over 77,000 people being formally arrested.
- Many victims of the Cambodian genocide have been described as political prisoners.

=== Individuals ===
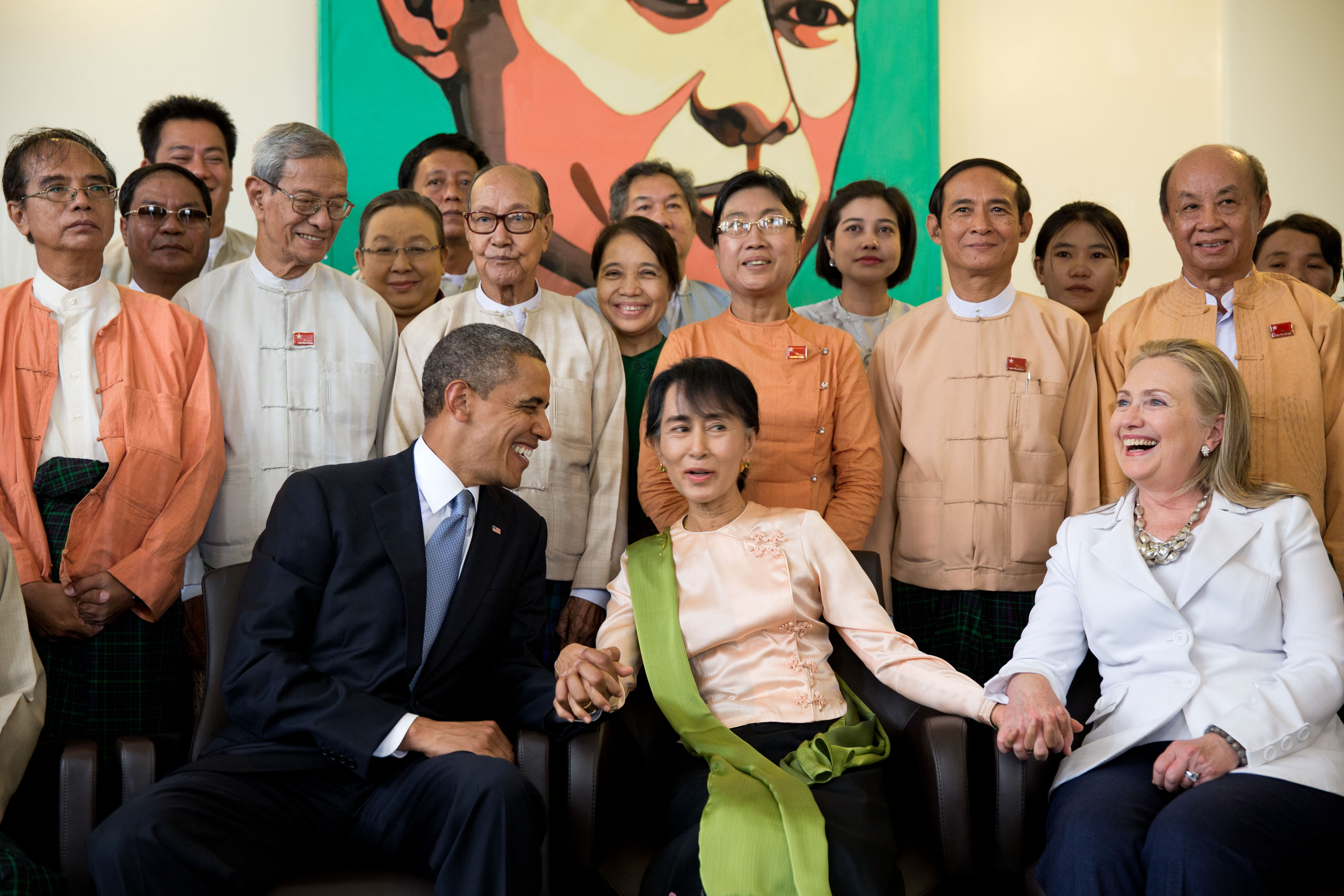
Nobel Peace Prize laureate Aung San Suu Kyi and her staff at her home in Yangon

Due to the lack of a single, internationally recognized legal definition of a political prisoner, nongovernmental organizations like Amnesty International, aided by legal scholars, determine whether prisoners meet their criteria of political prisoners on a case-by-case basis.

- Alváro Barreirinhas Cunhal, former pro-Soviet leader of the Portuguese Communist Party, he was imprisoned thrice (first in June 1937, then in 1940 and later from 1949 to 1960) for his staunch opposition to Portuguese dictatorship and for his political beliefs as well as his close ties to Soviet Russia. He famously escaped Peniche Fortress, one of the regime's political prisons, with ten other men on the third of January 1960.
- Aung San Suu Kyi led the opposition National League for Democracy which was victorious in the 1990 general election. She was imprisoned or under house arrest for 15 out of the 21 years from 1990 to 2010. In 2021, she was imprisoned by the Myanmar military in a coup d'état. As of August 2022, she is being held in solitary confinement serving a 17-year sentence following a series of secret trials.
- Ninoy Aquino of the Philippines was imprisoned during the martial law in the Philippines because of his vocal opposition against then President Ferdinand Marcos.
- Dietrich Bonhoeffer was a German pastor, theologian, anti-Nazi dissident, accused of being associated with the 20 July plot to assassinate Adolf Hitler.

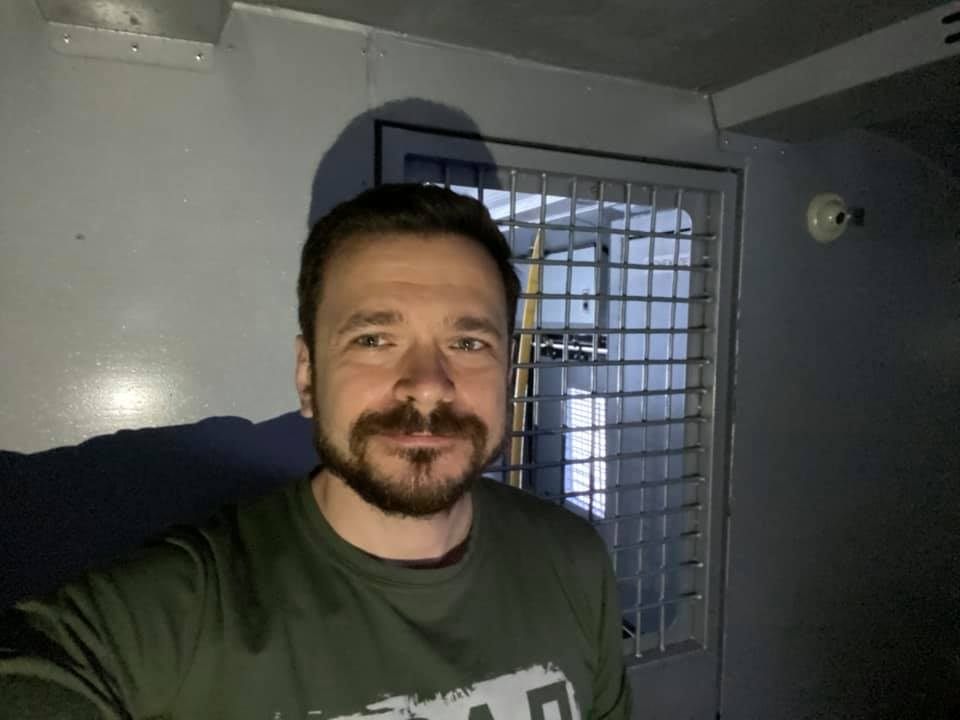
Russian opposition politician Ilya Yashin was sentenced to eight-and-a-half years in prison under Russia's war censorship laws for his anti-war statements in 2022.

- Rubin "Hurricane" Carter, African American boxer wrongfully imprisoned for 19 years in the US due to "an appeal to racism rather than reason".
- Eugene V. Debs, leader of the Socialist Party of the United States, was imprisoned by the US government for his opposition to the First World War.
- Mahatma Gandhi was imprisoned numerous times by the British both in South Africa and India.
- Emma Goldman was imprisoned for two years and then deported by the US government for her opposition to the First World War.
- Antonio Gramsci was a leftist Italian writer, and political activist who was jailed and spent 8 years in prison. He was released conditionally due to his health situation and died shortly after.
- Palden Gyatso, a Tibetan Buddhist monk arrested during the annexation of Tibet by the People's Republic of China for protesting, spent 33 years in Chinese prisons and labor camps where he was extensively tortured, serving the longest term of any Tibetan political prisoner.
- Anwar Ibrahim, a Malaysian opposition party leader, was imprisoned twice because of a sodomy case.
- Ekrem İmamoğlu, a Turkish opposition mayor and presidential candidate, has been imprisoned since 2025 for declaring his candidacy for the presidency.
- Kim Dae-jung served one term (1976–1979) and in 1980 was exiled to the United States, but returned in 1985 and became President of South Korea in 1998.
- Liliʻuokalani, Queen of Hawaiʻi was placed under house arrest at ʻIolani Palace during the United States-backed overthrow of the Kingdom of Hawaiʻi. Then, once Hawaiʻi was annexed as a territory, she was moved to Washington Place.
- Martin Luther King Jr. was imprisoned several times, most notoriously in Birmingham, Alabama.
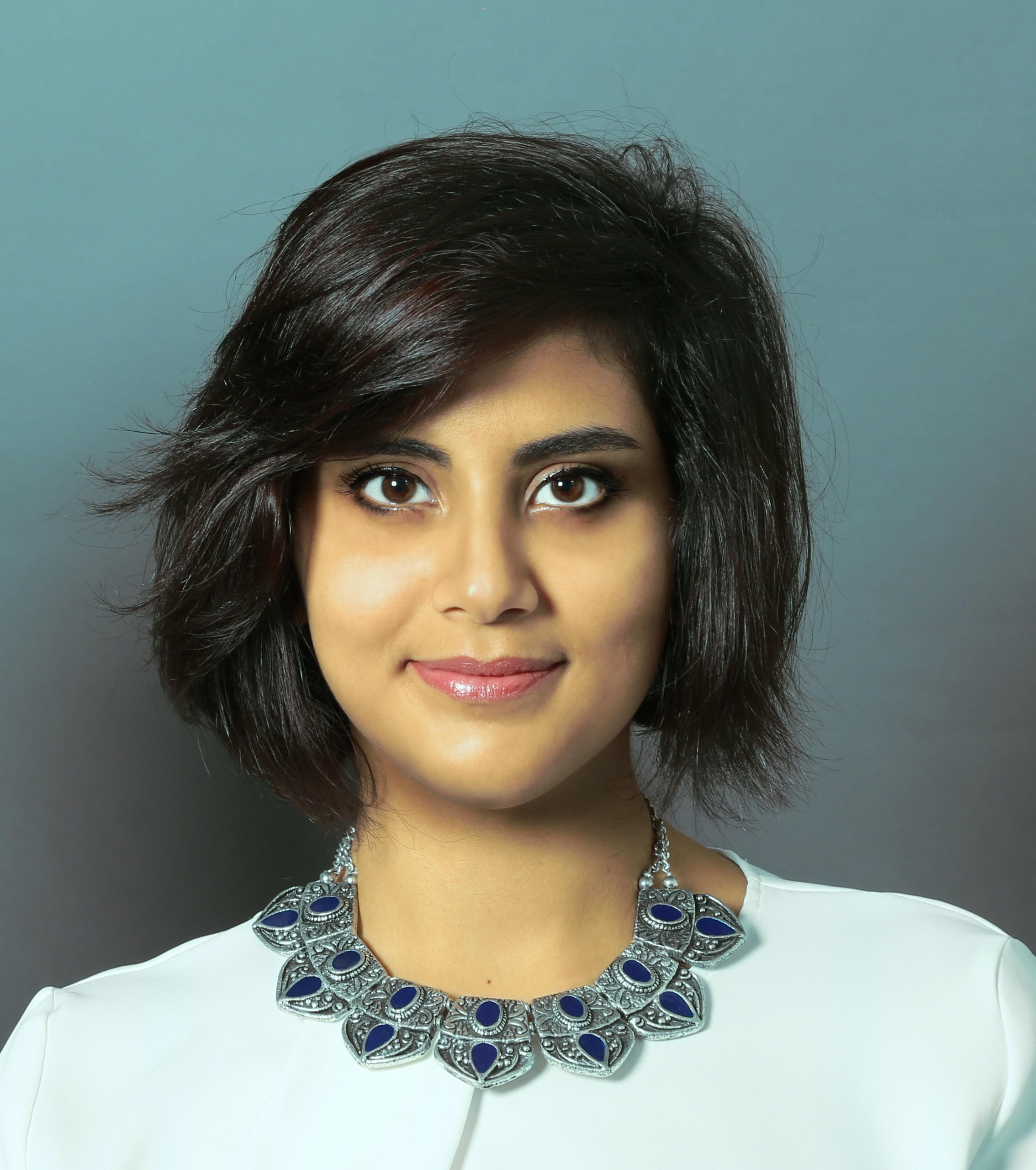
  Saudi women's rights activist and political prisoner Loujain al-Hathloul
- According to Amnesty International, Leopoldo López, a Venezuelan opposition leader, has been a prisoner of conscience.
- John Maclean was imprisoned by the British government for his opposition to the First World War.
- Heinrich Maier was a Roman Catholic priest and leader of one of the most important resistance groups against Nazi Germany.
- Nelson Mandela was imprisoned from 1963 until 1990 in South Africa due to his anti-apartheid activism and organizing attacks on several government targets. He later became the President of South Africa between 1994 and 1999.
- Thomas Mapfumo was imprisoned without charges in 1979 by the Rhodesian government in what is now Zimbabwe for his Shona-language music calling for revolution.
- Carlos Menem, a former Argentine president who was a political prisoner under the National Reorganization Process.
- Antonio Nariño (1765–1823) was a Colombian who translated the Declaration des Droits de L'Homme et du Citoyen into Spanish and faced multiple terms in prison under charges of translating censored material.
- Vinayak Damodar Savarkar, who due to his Hindu nationalist revolutionary activities against the British, was a political prisoner from 13 March 1910 to 10 May 1937, over 27 years.
- Jawaharlal Nehru, political activist, statesman, and first Prime Minister of India (1948–1963) was imprisoned several times for his nationalist activism against the British Raj, serving a total of over 9 years in incarceration.
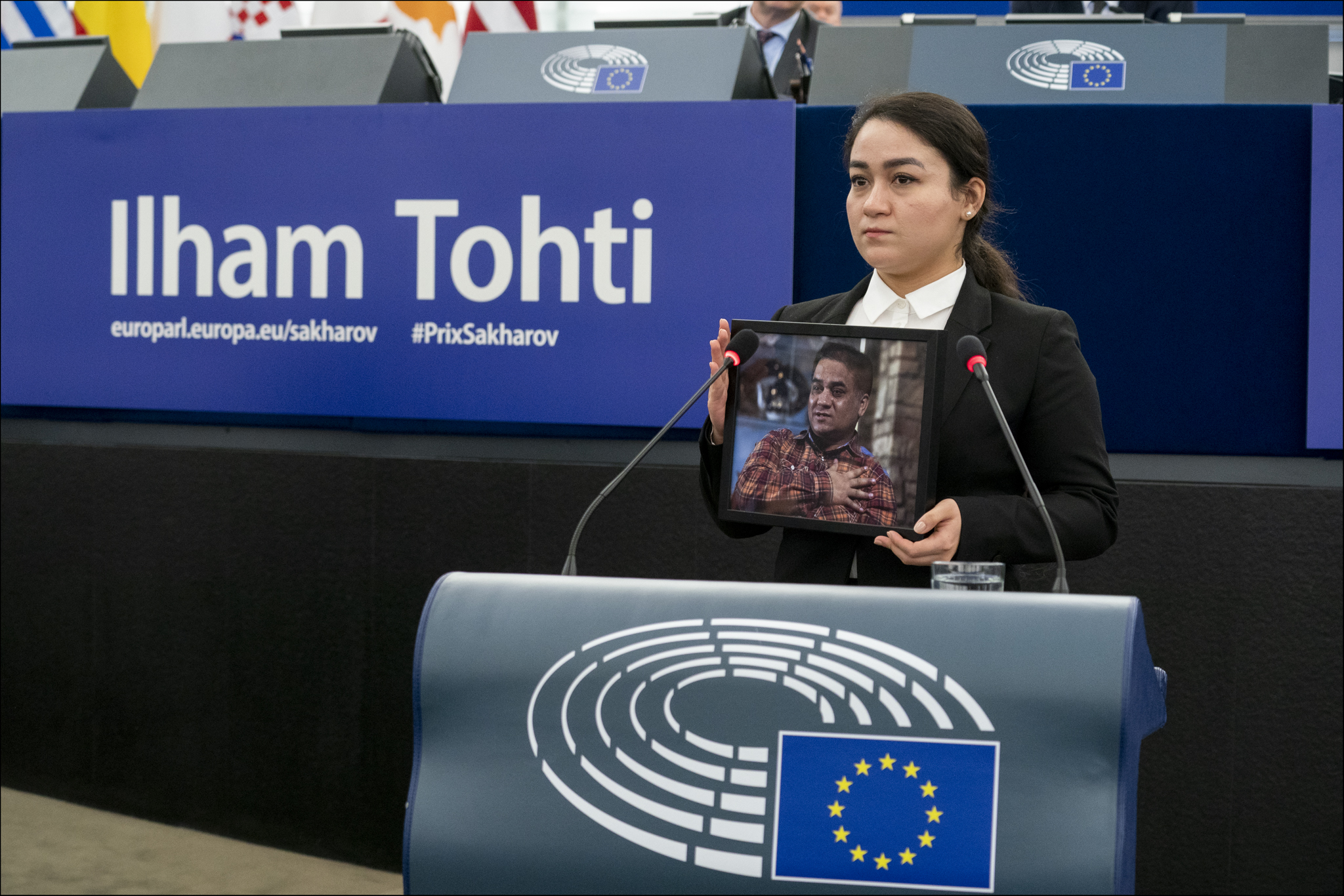
  The daughter of Ilham Tohti, an advocate for China's Uyghur minority who is currently serving a life sentence in China, accepted the 2019 Sakharov Prize for Freedom of Thought on behalf of her imprisoned father.
- Dilma Rousseff, a former Brazilian president, was imprisoned by the right-wing military government between 1970 and 1973.
- Bertrand Russell was imprisoned by the British government for six months for opposing the First World War.
- Mikis Theodorakis, a composer and lyricist, was imprisoned several times by Greek governments during the years 1947–1970.
- Leonora Christina Ulfeldt was imprisoned in solitary confinement in a royal dungeon for twenty-one years as the wife and later widow of Count Corfitz Ulfeldt.
- Ai Weiwei, is a Chinese artist and political dissident from the People's Republic of China.
- Liu Xiaobo a Chinese pro-democracy activist, was imprisoned multiple times (from the late 1980s to prior to his death in 2017) in China by the Chinese government.
- Hossein Rajabian is an Iranian filmmaker, writer and photographer who was imprisoned for 3 years as a political prisoner between 2015 and 2018 on charges related to his filmmaking in Evin prison in Iran.
- Ales Bialiatski is a Belarusian pro-democracy activist and prisoner of conscience known for his work with the Viasna Human Rights Centre. Bialiatski has been imprisoned twice; firstly from 2011 to 2014, and from 2021 to 2025, on both occasions on charges of tax evasion. Bialiatski, as well as other human rights activists, have called the charges politically motivated. In 2022, Bialiatski was awarded the 2022 Nobel Peace Prize, along with the organisations Memorial and Centre for Civil Liberties.
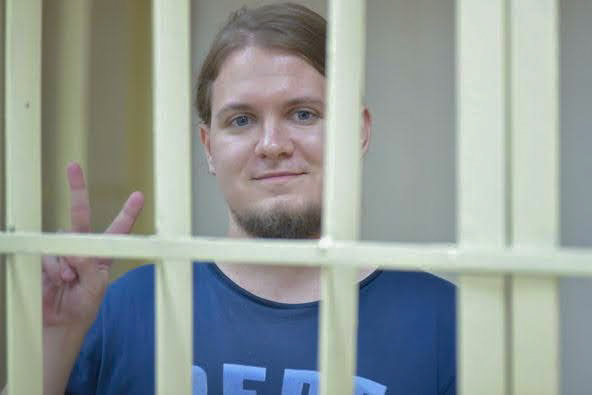
- Dmitry Ivanov was sentenced to 8.5 years in prison under Russia's the fake news law in 2022. Amnesty International has recognized Ivanov as a "prisoner of conscience", and the Memorial Society has listed him among political prisoners in Russia.
  Marat Zhylanbayev is a Kazakhstani athlete and activist who protested Kazakhstan's human rights violations outside the European Union's delegation to Kazakhstan; he was sentenced to seven years in prison.

== Notable political prisons ==
The following prisons have been recognized as incarcerating primarily political prisoners and have therefore been called "political prisons":

- Bereza Kartuska, interwar Poland
- Evin Prison, Iran
- Peter and Paul Fortress, Imperial Russia
- Shlisselburg Fortress, Imperial Russia
- Spaç Prison, Albania
- Peniche Fortress, Estado Novo, Portugal
- Pishchalauski Castle, Belarus

== By country ==
Category:Political prisoners by country

- Political prisoners in Azerbaijan
- Political prisoners in China
- List of Finnish MPs imprisoned for political reasons
- Political prisoners in Imperial Japan
- Political prisoners in Israel
- Political prisoners in Myanmar
- Political prisoners in Poland
- Political prisoners in Russia
- Political prisoners in Saudi Arabia
- Political prisoners in Syria
- Political prisoners in the United States
- Political prisoners in Venezuela

== See also ==
- Chilling effect
- Freedom of speech
- Hate speech
- Hostage diplomacy
- List of banned political parties
- List of memoirs of political prisoners
- List of people imprisoned for editing Wikipedia
- Parliamentary immunity
- Political censorship
- Political cleansing of population
- Political freedom
- Selective prosecution
- Sovereign immunity
- Working Group on Arbitrary Detention
