= Prisoner Without a Name, Cell Without a Number =

Memoir by Jacobo Timerman

- Front cover of the first edition
- Author: Jacobo Timerman
- Original title: Preso sin nombre, Celda sin número
- Translator: Tony Talbot
- Language: Spanish
- Subject: Argentina / Political prisoners
- Publisher: Random Editores
- Publication date: 1981
- English publication date: 1981
- ISBN: 0394749030
- OCLC: 1105278409

Prisoner Without a Name, Cell Without a Number (Spanish: Preso Sin Nombre, Celda Sin Numero) is a 1981 memoir by the liberal Jewish Argentine journalist and publisher Jacobo Timerman, who was imprisoned without due-process during the Dirty War in Argentina in April 1977, and was tortured while in prison. Though acquitted by a military court in October 1977, Timerman was kept under house arrest after his release in April 1978 until his deportation to Israel in September 1979.

== About the book ==
The book was written from January to July 1980 in Tel Aviv. It details his personal experiences in Argentina while also covering the larger political issues. In 1981, it was published in both the Spanish original and an English translation and quickly gained international popularity. Timerman was invited to lecture about his experience in Israel, Europe, Canada, and the United States, which increased his international recognition and publicized the human rights situation in Argentina.

The book weaves together different narratives, discussing Timerman's imprisonment, his biography, and larger topics of Argentine politics. Prisoner Without a Name provided new details to the world about the Argentine military dictatorship. For instance, it described a weekly lecture called "The Academy" held for police and military officers, who were taught that they were fighting a "World War III" against left-wing terrorists. The book describes antisemitism and anti-intellectualism within the military regime. In 1983, it was made into a television film, Jacobo Timerman: Prisoner Without a Name, Cell Without a Number.

In 2023, the Argentina's Human Rights Secretariat held a commemoration at the prison where Timerman was held, the former Centre of Tactical Operations I (COTI) in the Martínez suburb of Buenos Aires.

== See also ==
- List of memoirs of political prisoners
