= Jacobo Timerman: Prisoner Without a Name, Cell Without a Number =

1983 television film directed by Linda Yellen

- Genre: Drama
- Written by: Jonathan Platnick; Linda Yellen
- Directed by: Linda Yellen
- Starring: Roy Scheider
- Music by: Brad Fiedel
- Country of origin: United States
- Original language: English

Production
- Executive producers: Richard Dorso; Terry Ellis
- Producer: Linda Yellen
- Production locations: New York City; New Jersey
- Cinematography: Arthur J. Ornitz
- Editor: Jay Freund
- Running time: 100 minutes
- Production company: Schiller Productions Inc.

Original release
- Network: NBC
- Release: May 22, 1983

Jacobo Timerman: Prisoner Without a Name, Cell Without a Number is a 1983 American made-for-television drama film written, directed and produced by Linda Yellen. It is based on Jacobo Timerman's 1981 autobiographical book Prisoner Without a Name, Cell Without a Number. It was originally broadcast May 22, 1983 on NBC.

== Cast ==
- Roy Scheider as Jacobo Timerman
- Liv Ullmann as Mrs. Timerman
- Sam Robards as Daniel Timerman
- Zach Galligan as Hector Timerman
- Trini Alvarado as Lisa Castello
- Terry O'Quinn as Colonel Thomas Rhodes
- Christopher Murney as Colonel Rossi
- Michael Pearlman as Javier Timerman
- Lee Wilkof as Eduardo Sachon
- Joanna Merlin
