= Jacobo Timerman =

Argentine publisher, journalist and author (1923–1999)

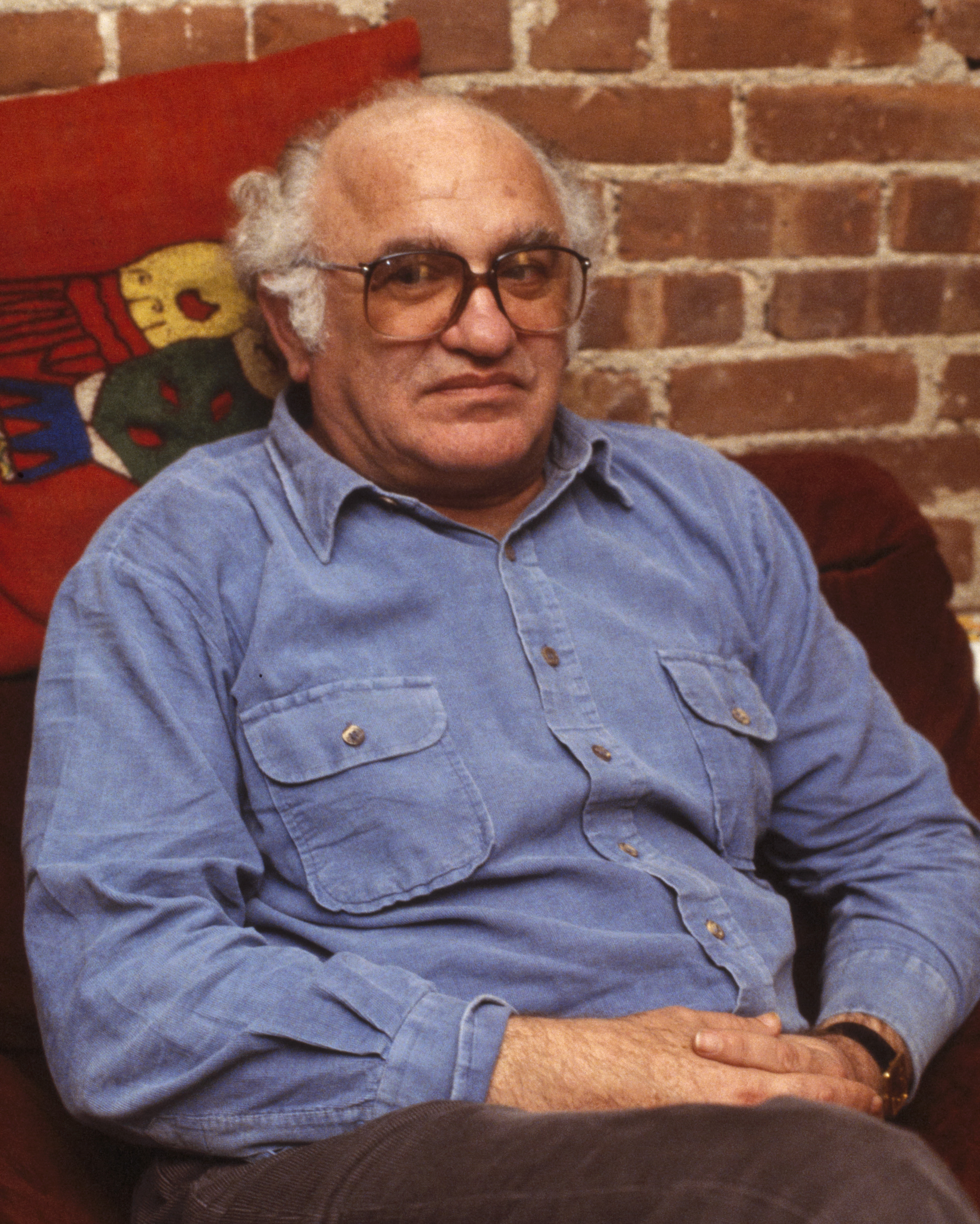
- Timerman c. 1980
- Born: 6 January 1923; Bar, Ukrainian SSR, Soviet Union
- Died: 11 November 1999 (aged 76); Buenos Aires, Argentina
- Citizenship: Argentine, Israeli
- Occupations: journalist, editor, author
- Spouse: Risha Mindlin
- Children: Héctor Timerman, Javier Timerman, Daniel Timerman
- Writing career
- Language: Spanish
- Subject: human rights
- Notable works: Preso sin nombre, celda sin número, 1980 (Prisoner Without a Name, Cell Without a Number, 1981), Israel: la guerra más larga. La invasión de Israel al Líbano,1982 (The Longest War: Israel in Lebanon, 1982) Chile, el galope muerto (1987), Cuba: un viaje a la isla (1990)
- Notable awards: ADL's Hubert H. Humphrey First Amendment Freedom Prize, Golden Pen of Freedom, Conscience-in-Media Award, Letelier-Moffitt Human Rights Award, Order of the Liberator General San Martín, World Press Freedom Hero

Jacobo Timerman (6 January 1923 – 11 November 1999) was a Soviet-born Argentine publisher, journalist, and author, who is most noted for his confronting and reporting the atrocities of the Argentine military regime's Dirty War during a period of widespread repression in which an estimated 30,000 political prisoners were disappeared. He was persecuted, tortured and imprisoned by the Argentine junta in the late 1970s and was exiled in 1979 with his wife to Israel. He was widely honored for his work as a journalist and publisher.

In Israel, Timerman wrote and published his most well-known book, Prisoner Without a Name, Cell Without a Number (1981), a memoir of his prison experience that added to his international reputation. A longtime Zionist, he also published The Longest War, a strongly critical book about Israel's 1982 Lebanon War.

Timerman returned to Argentina in 1984, and testified to the National Commission on the Disappearance of Persons. He continued to write, publishing books in 1987 about Chile under the Augusto Pinochet regime and in 1990 about Cuba under Fidel Castro.

== Early life ==
Yakov Timerman was born in 1923 to Jewish parents Eve Berman and Nathan Timerman in the town of Bar in central Ukraine. The town had a substantial Jewish population at the time. To escape the persecution of Jews and pogroms in Ukraine, the Timerman family emigrated to Argentina in 1928, when Yakov was five years old and his brother Joseph was seven. The family lived in the Jewish area of Buenos Aires, restricted by their poverty to occupying a single room. Yakov, now Jacobo, took a job at age 12, following the death of his father. While still young, he lost one eye due to an infection.

Timerman became a Zionist as a young man. He met his future wife, Risha Mindlin, at a Zionist conference in Mendoza. (Her surname has also been reported as Midlin.) They married on 20 May 1950 in a simple ceremony at the Mindlin house.

== Career ==
=== Journalist and publisher ===
Timerman gained work as a journalist and rose in his profession, reporting for various publications including the Agence France-Presse, Mail, What, News Charts, New Zion, and Commentary. He became fluent in English as well as Spanish. He gained experience and reported on Argentine and South American politics.

In 1962, Timerman founded Primera Plana, an Argentine news-weekly often compared to the American publication, Time magazine. In 1964 Timerman resigned as editor of Primera Plana, amid rumors of official threats due to his "line of opposition to the government". The magazine announced Timerman's resignation the week after it had reported on government threats to sanction uncooperative publications.

In 1965, he founded another news weekly titled Confirmado (The Journal).

The Armed Forces seized power in 1966, overthrowing president Arturo Illia. General Juan Carlos Onganía was installed as president, initiating a repressive and unpopular regime. His administration was characterized by its violent repression of Argentina's universities and intellectuals, and for its policy of establishing strict and conservative Catholic morals. Onganía suspended publication of Primera Plana in 1969. The next year it resumed publication but never regained its previous status. From his exile in Spain, former president Juan Perón bought Timerman's newspaper in 1970, planning to control it and part of the political discussion in the country.

Timerman founded La Opinión in 1971, which many considered "the greatest of his career. With it, Timerman began to cover topics in more depth and journalists signed their articles, so their work could be identified. His model was the French newspaper, Le Monde.

On 27 July 1972, the 20th anniversary of Eva Perón's death, terrorists set off 20 bombs in Argentina, most located in banks. But Timerman was one of numerous people targeted in the 20 attempted bombings.

Perón returned to Argentina from Spain in 1973 after his candidate Héctor Cámpora of the Justicialist Party was elected as president. Perón was widely understood to be the real power in the country, and the next year was elected as president after Campora stepped aside for him. His third wife, Isabel Perón, was elected as his vice-president. His death in 1974 raised uncertainty and political tensions. Isabel Perón succeeded him, becoming the first woman president in the Western Hemisphere. During the political unrest that year, Timerman received bomb threats by the Argentine Anti-Communist Alliance (also called the Triple A).

=== La Opinión ===
From 1971 to 1977, Timerman edited and published the left-leaning daily La Opinión. Under his leadership, this paper reported news and criticisms of the human rights violations of the Argentine government, into the early years of the Dirty War. One wealthy backer of the paper was David Graiver, a Jewish businessman said to have ties to the leftist guerrilla group known as Montoneros, which was banned. Graiver had lent money to the paper in 1974. Because of Graiver's alleged ties to the Montoneros, Timerman was later criticized for his connections to the businessman.

The publisher reported against both left-wing and right-wing terrorism. Some commentators have suggested that he supported a military coup to quell the violence. Timerman believed that his paper was the only one that dared to report accurately on current affairs without hiding the events behind euphemisms. Both Isabel Perón and the military regime that overthrew her government suspended the paper for short periods prior to Timerman's arrest. Timerman later wrote in Prisoner Without a Name (1981), "During my journalistic career, particularly as publisher and editor of La Opinión, I received countless threats". For example:

One morning two letters arrived in the same mail: one was from the rightist terrorist organization (protected and utilized by paramilitary groups) condemning me to death because of its belief that my militancy on behalf of the right to trial for anyone arrested and my battle for human rights were hindrances in overthrowing communism; the other letter was from the terrorist Trotskyite group, Ejercito Revolucionario Popular (ERP)—the Popular Revolutionary Army—and indicated that if I continued accusing leftist revolutionaries of being Fascists and referring to them as the lunatic Left, I would be tried and most likely sentenced to death.

Timerman maintained his outspoken support for Israel. In 1975, in response to the United Nations General Assembly Resolution 3379, which condemned Zionism as racism (as well as condemning South Africa's apartheid), he wrote "Why I Am A Zionist". (Originally passed largely by Non-aligned Nations following their conference that year, the resolution was revoked in 1991 by with UN General Assembly Resolution 46/86.)

=== 1976 military coup ===
A coup in 1976 installed General Jorge Rafael Videla and began "el Proceso"— military rule, including widespread persecution that came to be known as Argentina's "Dirty War". Timerman like many others had initially supported a military takeover, on the grounds that it might curb the country's pervasive violence.

Timerman continued to publish La Opinión for a year after the coup. He later speculated that moderates within the military had kept the paper alive because "the continued existence of La Opinión was a credit abroad; it backed the philosophy of future national reconstruction, it upheld the thesis of national unity, and was committed on a daily basis to curbing extremist excesses." The precise position of (and divisions within) the new government regarding Timerman and his paper, remains unknown.

Anti-semitism increased during the 1970s as right-wing factions became more powerful. Jews were targeted in the media, including television stations operated by the government. A book called Plan Andinia, published anonymously in 1977, warned of an international Zionist conspiracy to control part of Argentina.

Anti-semitic bombings also increased, to a frequency of ten per month in 1976. Police defused bombs placed outside of La Opinión headquarters during a wave of antisemitic violence in August of that year. An enormous bomb detonated in early 1977, at a screening of Victory at Entebbe (a pro-Israel film) in Córdoba, which damaged almost 80 businesses.

At the beginning of April, the military began to arrest people connected to the Argentine banker David Graiver, who had left the country in 1975 and was reported killed in a plane accident in Mexico in 1976. He had been under suspicion of financing the left-wing Montoneros guerrillas through money laundering of millions of dollars derived from their kidnapping ransoms. Reports suggest that between 100 and 300 people were arrested under this charge.

== Arrest ==
Before dawn on 15 April 1977, military police in civilian clothes appeared at Timerman's house and took him into custody. Enrique Jara, assistant editor of La Opinion, was also arrested. The Army announced that Timerman and Jara were being held, with 13 others, "in relation to the investigation of the Graiver case". The same day, the US Federal Bureau of Investigation announced that it had become involved in the case, and was hunting for Graiver under suspicion that his death had been faked. The military promoted the story of a Graiver conspiracy in the national and international press. For instance, a 17 April column in La Nación promised sweeping prosecution and punishment for all those involved.

On 25 May 1977, the government appointed General José Teófilo Goyret as the interventor (military supervisor) of La Opinión. Goyret later allowed the paper, worth $5,000,000, to quietly fold.

== Prison and torture ==
Timerman later testified:

After arresting me at my home in the federal capital, they took me to the police headquarters of Buenos Aires Province where I was interrogated by Camps and Etchecolatz; from there they transferred me to Campo de Mayo, where they made me sign a statement. Then they left me at Puesto Vasco, where I was tortured, after which I was again turned over to the Central Department of the Federal Police, where after 25 days I was able to get in touch with my family. From there they took me to COT-I Martínez to be tortured again, then again to the Central Department of the Federal Police. Ultimately, I was legally interned at the Magdalena penitentiary.

Both Ramón Camps and Miguel Etchecolatz were later indicted and convicted for their involvement in widespread torture and "disappearances" during the Dirty War. The kidnapping and detention of Timerman were found to have been ordered by General Guillermo Suárez Mason and his Batallón de Inteligencia 601. The three leaders were pardoned in 1991 by President Carlos Menem.

Timerman wrote later that he was arrested by "the extremist sector of the army", which "was also the heart of Nazi operations in Argentina". He said his captors accused him of involvement in the "Andinia Plan" (the alleged Zionist conspiracy to control part of Argentina). Timerman believed that these jailers spared his life because they saw him as a potentially crucial source of information about the plan. The guards also interrogated Timerman about his relationship to the late banker David Graiver. Timerman was subjected to electric shock torture, beatings, and solitary confinement.

=== Acquittal and house arrest ===
Timerman was acquitted by a military court in October 1977. The military continued to accuse him of "failure to observe basic moral principles in the exercise of public, political, or union offices". Rumors emerged on 30 March 1978 that the junta had decided to change Timerman's status. On 17 April 1978, he was officially released from prison but placed under permanent house arrest at his residence on Ayucucho Street.

At one point, soon after Patt Derian (US Secretary for Human Rights) had prodded Videla about the case, Timerman was summoned to appear before the Minister of the Interior. He asked why he was being held. The minister said: "You admitted to being a Zionist, and this point was revealed at a meeting of all the generals."

Timerman said: "But being a Zionist is not forbidden."

The Minister replied: "No, it isn't forbidden, but on the other hand it isn't a clearcut issue. Besides, you admitted to it. And the generals are aware of this."

=== Reactions to his imprisonment ===
Timerman became the single most famous Argentine political prisoner of the Dirty War. His wife, Risha, helped to raise international awareness about his imprisonment. Within the Argentine press, only the Buenos Aires Herald (written in English) covered Timerman's arrest. Herald editor Robert Cox was later arrested and imprisoned.

==== Jewish Argentine establishment ====
Authorities among the Jewish community in Argentina were notably quiet about Timerman's arrest. While some leaders were friends of the publisher, their institutions, particularly el Delegación de Asociaciones Israelitas de Argentina (DAIA), stayed relatively quiet on the topic.

According to Jacobo's brother, José:

The Jewish organizations took a passive approach, which amazed me, considering Jacobo’s systematic struggle against antisemitism and what happened during the Holocaust and so many other massacres suffered by the Jewish people throughout their history. I remember once I had a two-hour-long meeting with the executive board of the DAIA to ask it to undertake some kind of action in defense of my brother. But it was useless.

In April 1978, the DAIA finally issued a statement approving the government's shift of Timerman from prison to house arrest.

==== Israel ====
The reluctance of the Jewish establishment in Argentina to defend Timerman added to Israel's difficulties in choosing a way to respond to the political crisis in the country. As an Israeli ambassador wrote after the fact, "the leaders are offended because Timmerman is accusing them of behaving like the Judenrat, and the publication of the announcement [of an award] seems to lend credence to an accusation of this kind, so they do not like it at all".

The Israeli government maintained diplomatic ties and arms sales to the Argentine regime during this period, despite the Carter Administration's end to US weapons transfers under the Kennedy-Humphrey Amendment. Appeals from the Argentine Jewish community, which was disproportionately targeted in the Dirty War, were generally ignored by the Israeli government. The Knesset prohibited discussion on this topic.

Yet Timerman's high-profile arrest, particularly in light of his known Zionist affiliations, elicited a diplomatic response from Israel. According to historian Raanan Rein and journalist Efraim Davidi,

"Israel's official policy can be described as an effort to show the junta that it had committed a serious error in arresting the journalist but to avoid rousing international public opinion against the regime and, even more important, to avoid attributing antisemitic proclivities to the leaders of the dictatorship."

The Israeli government secretly pressured Argentina to free Timerman, but did not make public demands as it did on behalf of Jews in the Soviet Union.

Yishayahu Anug, director-general of Israel's Foreign Ministry, wrote:

"I would say not that Timerman is crucial for us but rather that we are crucial for his release. It is not an emotional issue but one of cool judgment. The formula consists in creating the sense that his release is vital for Argentina's image and also for Israel and the positive development of our relations with them."

As part of this approach, Israeli diplomats sought to downplay press coverage of Timerman's imprisonment.

According to a 2001 account by Timerman's son Héctor, Israeli Ambassador Ram Nirgad and the American-Argentine rabbi Marshall Meyer visited the Timerman house. Nirgad asked Timerman to sign a letter saying that he was well treated and had no problems with the government. The journalist refused and said he'd rather remain in detention.

After the failure of Nirgad's initial efforts to achieve Timerman's release, through conversations with Videla and others, Israel sought to add pressure by proxy. Anug's new plan solicited the quiet assistance of anti-communist diplomats and authors in other nations. Not much progress had been made before Timerman was released in 1979.

==== United States ====
Timerman condemned Henry Kissinger (Nixon's National Security Advisor) for supporting the military regime, even after President Jimmy Carter took office. Carter raised his administration's concerns about human rights in Argentina publicly when General Videla visited Washington DC in November 1977 to sign the Panama Canal Treaties. Rep. Silvio O. Conte of Massachusetts visited Timerman in early 1978, subsequently calling for his release and characterizing his imprisonment as a human rights issue.

As part of a broad change in foreign policy based around human rights, the United States Carter Administration in 1978 had condemned Argentina's activities. In doing so, it reversed the position of the preceding Nixon Administration, which had supported the 1976 military coup.

While Timerman was still detained under house arrest in 1979, Patricia Derian, the US Secretary for Human Rights, reported that the Argentine human rights situation had improved.

In August 1979, a group of 18 US Congresspeople spoke out on Timerman's behalf. These included Chris Dodd, John H. Rousselot, Gus Yatron, Benjamin Stanley Rosenthal, Henry Waxman, and Gladys Spellman, who compared the situation in Argentina to the Nazi Holocaust.

Several commentators have credited the Timerman case and his 1981 memoir with raising awareness of human rights abuses in South America with an otherwise apathetic United States audience.

==== Other powers ====
The Soviet Union also maintained ties with Argentina's government during this period, and the nations had trade relations. Diplomatic relations were not particularly strong, as Videla opposed communism and considered Argentina to be part of a general alliance with Israel against the USSR.

== 1978 World Cup ==
The 1978 FIFA World Cup took place in Argentina, providing publicity to both the military regime and its opponents. The government sought to engineer a win for its team by any means necessary. Timerman later said that Argentine dissidents all rooted for the Dutch football team, out of appreciation for the Netherlands' efforts to counteract the regime's self-promotion.

== Release and exile ==
On 19 September 1979, the Argentine Supreme Court of Justice responded to a habeas corpus petition and ordered Timerman's immediate release. On 20 September, the government held a large secret meeting to decide its response. Some military leaders wanted to disobey the ruling, but President Videla and others threatened resignation, insisting on Timerman's release.

On 25 September, the Foreign Ministry confirmed that Israel would accept Timerman. His Argentine citizenship was revoked, and he was placed on a flight to Madrid in Spain, en route to Israel. One of the escorting Israelis, Pinhas Avivi, advised Timerman to remain quiet about his imprisonment. Timerman disregarded this advice and gave a press conference by telephone as soon as he landed in Madrid. He then traveled to Israel, arriving in time for Yom Kippur. His wife and three sons also moved to Israel.

== Israel ==
Upon arriving in Israel, Timerman took up residence in Ramat Aviv (a neighborhood of Tel Aviv). He was given Israeli citizenship. The military had confiscated all his assets in Argentina, but he still owned a summer home in Uruguay, which he sold.

He made an agreement with Ma'ariv to write six articles on his imprisonment. These were to be syndicated internationally. Timerman was dissuaded from publishing the articles by Foreign Ministry director Yosef Chechanover. He met with him in October 1979 and argued that an exposé would endanger "disappeared" Jews and their families in Argentina.

Seeking to maintain good relations with Argentina to avoid reprisals against political prisoners, the Israeli government downplayed the significance of Timerman's imprisonment. The Foreign Ministry pressed for relocation of the ceremony on 25 May 1980, when Timerman was to receive the Golden Pen of Freedom Award, from the Knesset to a room in Hebrew University. Yitzhak Shamir, the minister of foreign affairs, passed over the ceremony in favor of a holiday reception at the Argentine embassy. Prime Minister Menachem Begin did not attend either, although organizers had at first expected him.

=== Press ===
Two weeks after Timerman's release, Nissim Elnecavé editorialized in La Luz (a conservative Jewish Argentine newspaper) that the journalist had been a subversive. He said the publisher had been released because of (not in spite of) his Judaism. This editorial was reprinted in La Prensa, another conservative pro-regime newspaper, on 14 October. Two days later the Argentine ambassador Jorge Aja Espil had it delivered to each member of the U.S. Congress.

=== Prisoner Without a Name ===
In Tel Aviv, Timerman wrote Prisoner Without a Name, Cell Without a Number (published in 1981), a memoir about his experiences in Argentina, which also dealt with larger political issues. The book gained instant international popularity. Timerman was invited to lecture about his experiences in many countries, including Israel, Europe, Canada, and the United States, which increased his international recognition and publicized the human rights situation in Argentina.

The book weaves together different narratives, discussing Timerman's imprisonment, his biography, and larger topics of Argentine politics. Prisoner Without a Name provided new details to the world about the Argentine military dictatorship. For example, it discusses a weekly lecture called "The Academy" held for police and military officers, who were taught that they were fighting a "World War III" against left-wing terrorists. It also discusses antisemitism and anti-intellectualism within the military regime.

In 1983, the book was turned into a television film, Jacobo Timerman: Prisoner Without a Name, Cell Without a Number.

==== Responses ====
The book was published first in English, by Knopf in the United States with Ashbel Green as senior editor. Ma'ariv was slated to publish a Hebrew version in Israel but pulled out of the project. Domino published it instead. Amos Elon noted in an editorial in Ha'aretz that "one of the main shareholders of Ma'ariv has close business ties with Argentina […] Timerman put many people in a bind in this country and at Ma'ariv by criticizing the Begin government's internal and external policy. The dignitaries and public figures who welcomed him at the airport have distanced themselves from him. We can guess why".

The Canadian Patrick Martin compared Prisoner Without a Name favorably to works by Arthur Koestler, Alexander Solzhenitsyn, and Elie Wiesel, writing: "But this book is important because the writing is lyrical, even in its horrific detail; because the author is skilful in providing historical respites as the reader travels along the edge of revulsion. It is important also because the events happened today, in this hemisphere. It has never seemed so real".

President Videla complained to a newly appointed Israeli ambassador in 1980 that Timerman was "orchestrating a campaign to defame Argentina around the world". The Argentine government maintained that Timerman had been arrested mostly because of his involvement with David Graiver. Argentine diplomats continued to pressure Israel on the topic, saying that Timerman "takes the name of the Holocaust in vain by comparing Argentina today with Nazi Germany". Israel reduced its official discussion of Timerman, retracting from the Southern Cone a pamphlet that discussed awards he received in Israel.

In 1982, Colonel Ramón Camps (the Buenos Aires Police Chief who had been directly involved in torturing Timerman) wrote, with assistance from La Prensa publisher Máximo Gainza, Caso Timerman: Punto final, a response to Prisoner Without a Name. He wrote that Timerman "was destroying the bases of society" with La Opinión, particularly its "cultural supplements and section on international politics". He called Timerman a "champion" of Marxism, "the heresy of modern times".

=== Lefever nomination and Kirkpatrick Doctrine ===
In 1981, Timerman publicly opposed U.S. President Ronald Reagan's nomination of Ernest Lefever as Assistant Secretary of State for Human Rights and Humanitarian Affairs. When Timerman attended a hearing of the Senate Foreign Relations Committee pertaining to Lefever, his presence brought additional attention to the issue of human rights in Argentina. Timerman had praised Patt Derian, who had held the Human Rights position during his imprisonment. During the hearing, Senator Claiborne Pell asked if Lefever would speak against "disappearances" as Derian had done; Lefever responded, "I believe my job is to help sensitize the entire foreign policy establishment to the concern for human rights rather than play a Sir Galahad role going around the world on personal missions".

As a foreigner, Timerman was not allowed to testify at the hearing. He spoke to reporters in the hall outside, commenting that "a quiet diplomacy is a silent diplomacy […] Nations maintained a silent diplomacy with Hitler, and you see what happened". He continued, discussing human rights and US foreign policy:

Do you expect to change a government with a policy? No, if you want to change the government you have to send in the Marines. What a human rights foreign policy does is save lives. And Jimmy Carter's policy did. How many? I don't know. Two thousand? Is that enough? But that policy is even more important to you than to us. It builds up a democratic consciousness in the United States. It is more important for the United States that Lefever be defeated than for Argentina. I am very disappointed in President Reagan. A new administration is entitled to change an approach, to change a strategy, but not to change a policy. The policy of human rights belongs to United States history. This administration is not changing a strategy, but an ideology.

Timerman's opposition is credited with ensuring the failure of the Lefever nomination.

Conservative US critics, such as William Buckley, Norman Podhoretz, and Irving Kristol, criticized Timerman's comments and noted that he had a relationship with the indicted, late banker David Graiver, accused of laundering funds for leftist guerrillas. Kristol used the Graiver connection to explain the inaction of the Jewish community in Argentina, suggesting that it had "implicitly vindicat[ed] the Reagan administration's prudent policy on human rights".

On the other hand, Timerman's experiences were used as good reason by some to oppose the Kirkpatrick Doctrine—a key concept under the Reagan Administration for maintaining diplomatic relations with regimes that were classified as "authoritarian", not "totalitarian".

The failure of the Lefever nomination disappointed the Argentine government. Aja Espil, the Argentine ambassador in Washington, wrote to his government that "it must be analyzed not as an isolated incident, but in conjunction with a resurgence in the campaign against the Argentinian government, exacerbated by the publicity over Timerman and his book". Timerman became the object of increasing political controversy in the US. As his high-profile alarmed the Argentine military government, it responded by releasing interrogation transcripts suggesting a connection between Timerman and the discredited Graiver.

=== The Longest War ===
Soon after completing his prison memoir, Timerman and other journalists were taken to Lebanon to see Israel's 1982 war up close. In response, he wrote a book titled, The Longest War: Israel's Invasion of Lebanon (1982). He was deeply disturbed by the 1982 Lebanon War although he had been an ardent Zionist for most of his life.

Timerman was also disappointed by Israel's occupation of Palestinian territory. He wrote: "And I'm angry, too, with us, with the Israelis who by exploiting, oppressing, and victimizing them [the Palestinians] made the Jewish people lose their moral tradition, their proper place in history." The book describes Timerman's decisions: still recovering from having been tortured in prison, he advised his son Daniel to accept a jail sentence rather than do military service in Lebanon. Daniel was sentenced to prison.

Described by some critics as "a polemic" and "unabashedly pro-Palestinian", the book identifies Israel as the aggressor in the 1982 conflict. Timerman compared Israel's treatment of Palestinians to South Africa's treatment of Blacks under Apartheid. He also criticized the U.S. policy in the Mideast: "History will not forgive the United States for not having taken a hand in the conflict long before 1973, as would have been proper for the leading power at the time."

Timerman included an epilogue about the Sabra and Shatila massacre, a mass slaughter of Palestinians in Lebanon refugee camps that occurred in September 1982. He held the Israel Defense Forces and the government's foreign policy responsible. Conservative Rabbi Arthur Hertzberg "found [Timerman's] criticism of the Israel Army exaggerated."

Timerman was one of the earliest and most outspoken Israeli critics of the war, and his status as a Zionist human rights advocate made his opinion difficult to discount. But his position was not popular among Israelis, who justified the war to themselves. "Jacobo Timerman is asking for trouble", wrote Canadian journalist Patrick Martin, then the Middle East correspondent for The Globe and Mail. "He has been in Israel for less than three years and has written a book which attempts to purge the Jewish state of its hatred for Palestinians". In addition, his book received little coverage by the Jewish press and others in the United States.

In 1982 deputy foreign minister Yehuda Ben Meir said on the United States news program 60 Minutes: "We got him out of Argentina. Now he attacks and denigrates Israel. Any rational person can understand that his book is a collection of calumnies and lies arising from his own self-hatred". Timerman was shunned by some Israelis and American Jews after his criticism. Later many of his obituaries in the Israeli and US press downplayed or omitted this period of his life to avoid acknowledging his criticism of Israel.

== Journeys and return to Argentina ==
Sometime after the publication of The Longest War, Timerman left Israel with his wife. According to journalist Amos Elon, Timerman felt disappointed by the Israeli state—not "like a Jew coming home", as he had hoped. Nevertheless, said Timerman, "I am an Israeli citizen, I behave like an Israeli citizen, and I am always going to be an Israeli citizen."

He moved to Madrid and then to New York.

Timerman praised the election of Raúl Alfonsín, saying: "Alfonsín's victory has opened an era of democracy that is a completely new phenomenon in Argentina." Judge Fernando Zavalia had, in July 1982, ordered the release of all others arrested in connection with the Graiver case. (However, not all had been freed.)

On 7 January 1984, he and Risha returned to Buenos Aires. One son stayed in Israel and another settled in New York. A third returned to Argentina.

Timerman retained his Israeli citizenship, commenting soon after his return to Buenos Aires: "I am an Israeli citizen. If the Argentine government voluntarily decides to give me my Argentine citizenship back, I will accept it only as long as I can keep my Israeli nationality."

Upon returning to Argentina, Timerman testified to the National Commission on the Disappearance of Persons (Comisión Nacional sobre la Desaparición de Personas, CONADEP) about his experience in prison. With Rabbi Marshall Meyer (co-chair of the commission along with Ernesto Sabato), he re-visited the prisons where he underwent torture.

In 1985 the government prosecuted numerous people for crimes committed during the Dirty War in the Trial of the Juntas, and major figures were convicted and sentenced to prison. In 1986 Congress passed Ley de Punto Final, stopping the prosecutions and "putting a line" under the events.

Timerman became director of La Razón (The Reason), but also published articles in other papers. As a journalist, Timerman continued to criticize the government of Israel for what he considered its shortcomings. A 1987 op-ed by Timerman in El País described Israel as "intoxicated", akin to a European colonial power in its exploitation of Palestinian labor.

He noted that Israelis and some Americans who had formerly given him awards were unhappy with his criticism of Israel. During this period, he said in an interview with the journalist Richard Curtiss,

"How am I received now by those American organizations that gave me awards a few years ago? My old friends meet with me and whenever I visit the States I'm still invited to speak to some Jewish groups about the problems with Israel. Privately many of them agree that Israel isn't everything we wanted it to be. What they don't realize is that if we want it to change, we have to say so. Until the American Jewish community realizes this, there's no role in Israel for people like me."

=== Chile: Death in the South ===
In 1987, Timerman released Chile: Death in the South, a critical examination of life under the dictator Augusto Pinochet. The book highlights the poverty, hunger, and violence inflicted by Pinochet's military dictatorship. It also argues that Chilean society had lost cultural depth in the environment of political repression.

Timerman argues that Chilean centrists and right-wing must be prepared to step in and govern in place of the military. He also suggested that the Catholic Church would play an important role in renewal of the country. The book was translated into English by Robert Cox and published in the United States and London.

=== Cuba: A Journey ===
Timerman's 1990 book on Cuba criticized both the Communist government and the adverse effects of the US blockade on Cuba. He suggested that little political change could be achieved in the country until Castro's rule ended.

=== Dissident once more ===
Timerman was an early critic of Carlos Saúl Menem of the Justicialist Party, who became a presidential candidate after serving as governor of La Rioja Province. In 1988, during the presidential campaign, Timerman criticized Menem's plan to establish a free port at Isla Martin Garcia, saying it would encourage drug trafficking and money laundering. Menem filed a libel suit against the journalist that year. Timerman was acquitted in the trial, as well as in an appeals trial. Timerman opposed Menem during his election campaign in 1988.

Menem was elected with 47.5% of the vote, defeating the Radical Civic Union candidate. In 1991 he pardoned major figures who had been convicted of kidnapping, disappearances and torture committed during the Dirty War and sentenced to prison. Timerman condemned Menem for giving the pardons. He wrote in a 1991 editorial:

In April 1977, General Carlos Guillermo Suárez Mason ordered my kidnapping in Buenos Aires. A few days ago this man, the cruelest leader of the dirty war, was released from prison, pardoned by President Carlos Saúl Menem. Argentina had obtained his extradition from the US, charged with 43 murders and the kidnapping of 24 people who have since disappeared. During those months of 1977, Colonel Ramon Camps, the most brutal torturer of the dirty war, was in charge of the torture I suffered during interrogation. A few days ago he too was set free, pardoned by Mr. Menem. He had been accused of 214 extortionist kidnappings; 120 cases of torture, 32 homicides; two rapes; two abortions resulting from torture; 18 thefts; and the kidnappings of 10 minors who have disappeared.

Timerman warned that Argentina was slipping back into totalitarianism, and wrote "I hardly live in Argentina anymore" due to fear of meeting a former torturer. "Almost all the torturers were free before this latest batch of pardons", wrote Timerman, "but now the leaders who conceived, planned, and carried out the only genocide recorded in Argentinian history are also at large."

In 1992 Timmerman testified against Menem in a case regarding the citizenship of arms dealer Monzer al-Kassar. The journalist began spending more time outside the country. His health was failing; he had a heart attack and later surgery after a stroke.

In 1996, with journalist Horacio Verbitsky, novelist Tomás Eloy Martínez, and others, Timerman co-founded a press freedom organization in Buenos Aires known as Periodisitas.

In March 1996, the Supreme Court ordered a new trial in the libel case first opened in 1988 by Menem and twice won by Timerman. Menem's attorneys had alleged procedural errors. Timerman had written to the Court, declining to defend the case again, from Uruguay, where he had retired. Timerman said there was no arrest warrant against him and that he had been persecuted and condemned to "a second exile." He said he had not written for years, nor appeared on TV or in lectures, and had been ill. He noted that the President of the Supreme Court was an associate of Menem's in their law practice in La Rioja. Periodistas, the Association for the Defense of Independent Journalism, protested the order for the trial.

=== Death ===
Severely depressed following his wife's death in 1992, Timerman suffered failing health in his last years, but continued to fight for press freedom. He died of a heart attack in Buenos Aires on 11 November 1999.

=== Later events ===
In 2003 the Argentine Congress repealed the 1986 Ley de Punto Final. The government re-opened prosecution of crimes committed during the Dirty War. In 2006 Miguel Etchecolatz, Director of Investigations, in the provincial police, who had overseen Timerman's arrest and torture, was convicted and sentenced to prison. In its sentencing, the 3-judge tribunal described the actions of Etchecolatz against political prisoner as genocide, the first time the term was applied that way in Argentine trials.

On 9 October 2007, the Catholic priest Christian Von Wernich, personal confessor of provincial chief of police Ramón Camps and holding rank of inspector under Etchecolatz, was convicted of involvement in the abduction and torture of Timerman and numerous other political prisoners in the 1970s. He was sentenced to life imprisonment.

== Legacy and awards ==
- 1979, near the end of his imprisonment, Timerman won the Hubert H. Humphrey First Amendment Freedom Prize from the Jewish Anti-Defamation League.
- In 1980, Timerman was awarded the Golden Pen of Freedom by the World Association of Newspapers in recognition of his courage in defending the right to free expression and press freedom.
- His 1981 memoir, Prisoner Without a Name, earned him many awards:
  - Conscience-in-Media Award from the American Society of Journalists and Authors
  - CWA Gold Dagger for Non-Fiction
  - Hillman Prize
  - Los Angeles Times Book Prize for Current Events
  - Letelier-Moffitt Human Rights Award from the Institute for Policy Studies
  - Peabody Award
- 1984, Argentine President Raúl Alfonsín decorated him with The Order of the Liberator General San Martín, the country's highest honor.
- 2000, Timerman was posthumously named as one of the International Press Institute's 50 World Press Freedom Heroes of the past 50 years.

== Family ==
Jacobo and Risha Timerman had three sons together. When they emigrated to Israel, their sons accompanied them. The Timermans returned to Argentina in 1984, after leaving Israel in 1982, and living briefly in Madrid and New York City.

Daniel Timerman settled in Israel, where he and his wife had three children. As a young man, he was sentenced to multiple prison terms for refusing to serve in the 1982 Lebanon war.

Héctor Timerman also returned to Argentina and became an author and journalist. He served as Argentina's Foreign Minister in the 21st century. He was previously Consul in New York and was appointed Ambassador to the United States of America in December 2007.

Javier Timerman settled in New York with his wife and three children.

== See also ==
- Andrew Graham-Yooll – Argentine journalist (1944–2019)
- Héctor Germán Oesterheld – Argentine journalist and novelist
- History of the Jews in Argentina
- List of memoirs of political prisoners
- List of war films and TV specials set between 1945 and 2001
