= Daniel Talbot (film distributor) =

Co-founder of New Yorker Films

Daniel Talbot (July 21, 1926 – December 29, 2017) was an American cinema owner and film distributor. With his wife Toby Talbot, he co-founded the distribution company New Yorker Films and ran several Manhattan theaters including Lincoln Plaza Cinemas. He died on December 29, 2017, at the age of 91.
