= List of memoirs of political prisoners =

A memoir is an autobiographical writing normally dealing with a particular subject from the author's life. The following is a list of writers who have described their experiences of being political prisoners. Those included in the list are individuals who were imprisoned for activities ranging from peaceful dissent to violent revolutionary activity. Some were citizens of the countries whose regimes imprisoned them and others were foreign nationals. What connects them is that they have written about their experience of having been imprisoned because of their political opposition or political identity.

Note, too, that the list omits many autobiographies which deal, only in part, with a period of political imprisonment; and includes some in which imprisonment forms a major part of the book.

- Henri Alleg, author of The Question. 1958. New York: George Braziller. (theme: denunciation of torture in French colonial Algeria)
- Nicolae Constantin Batzaria, author of În închisorile turcești ("In Turkish Prisons"). 1921.
- Alexander Berkman, author of Prison Memoirs of an Anarchist. 1999 (originally 1912). New York: New York Review of Books Classics. (theme: loss of youthful idealism) ISBN 0-940322-34-X
- Francois Bizot, author of The Gate. 2003. New York: Alfred A. Knopf. ISBN 0-375-41293-X (themes: criticism of the ignorance of Western decision-makers and intellectuals about Cambodia, complex character of Khmer Rouge leader Duch, bravery and betrayal)
- Brendan Behan, author of Borstal Boy. 2000 (originally 1958). David R. Godine. (theme: resistance to British imperialism) Note that Borstal Boy is one of comparatively few memoirs written by a juvenile political prisoner.
- Breyten Breytenbach, author of The True Confessions of an Albino Terrorist. 1985. New York: Farrar Straus & Giroux. ISBN 0-374-27935-7 (theme: subjectivities of imprisonment)
- Vartouhie Calantar-Nalbandian, confined in Constantinople's Central Prison from 1915 to 1917, serialised her prison memoirs in the Armenian feminist journal Hay Gin. Hers is the only known first person narrative of an Ottoman prisoner and is the earliest known women's prison memoir in the Middle East.
- Nien Cheng, author of Life and Death in Shanghai. 1987. London: Grafton Books. ISBN 0-586-07115-6 (theme: denunciation of Maoism)
- Stuart Christie, author of Granny Made Me An Anarchist: General Franco, The Angry Brigade and Me. 2004. London: Simon & Schuster. ISBN 0-7432-5918-1 (theme: denunciations of sectarian hatred in Scotland and of statist authoritarianism, including British imperialism, American imperialism, Francoism, Stalinism and Trotskyism)
- Lena Constante. 1995. The Silent Escape: Three Thousand Days in Romanian Prisons. Trans: Franklin Philip. Berkeley: University of California Press. ISBN 0-520-08209-5 }(theme: denunciation of Ceaușescu's National Communism)
- Ron Glick (activist), author of U.S. Political Prisoner Since 2004: The True Story of an Innocent Man Detained as a Political Dissident in Kalispell, Montana. 2014. Montana: Createspace. (themes: use of propaganda and prejudice against sexual predators to imprison dissident under false charges to discredit the political prisoner's claims against government) ISBN 1502340364
- Antonio Gramsci, author of Prison Notebooks. 1929-1935.
- Julius Fučík (journalist), Notes from the Gallows, Czech communist in German Nazi prisons, executed
- Elizabeth Gurley Flynn. 1963. The Alderson Story: My Life As a Political Prisoner. International Publishers. ISBN 0-7178-0002-4
- Clare Hanrahan. 2005. Conscience & Consequence: A Prison Memoir. 2005. Asheville: Celtic WordCraft. ISBN 0-9758846-1-1 (theme: Chronicles the peaceful protest actions resulting in author's imprisonment, and provides inside view of Alderson Federal Prison for Women.)
- Václav Havel, author of Letters to Olga. Samizdat publication, 1988 in English. Henry Holt & Company. ISBN 0-8050-0973-6 (theme: phenomenology of imprisonment)
- Adolf Hitler, author of Mein Kampf. 1925.
- Kang Chol-Hwan, author of The Aquariums of Pyongyang: Ten Years in a North Korean Gulag. (written with Pierre Rigoulet) 2000. New York: Basic Books. ISBN 0-465-01102-0 (theme: description of life in North Korean labor camps)
- George Jackson: Soledad Brother, written while he was incarcerated in Soledad State Prison, published in 1970
- Robert Hillary King, author of From the Bottom of the Heap: The Autobiography of a Black Panther, 2008. Oakland, California: PM Press ISBN 978-1-60486-039-9
- Murat Kunaz, author of Five Years of My Life: An Innocent Man in Guantanamo, 2008.
- Carlo Levi, author of Christ Stopped at Eboli, 1945, actually a memoir of internal exile of a political dissident.
- Primo Levi, author of If This Is a Man (also known as Survival in Auschwitz), 1947; he was arrested as a partisan.
- Eduard Limonov, author of The triumph of metaphysics, 2005. Moscow: Ad Marginem ISBN 5-9332-1100-1 (theme: internal experiences of political prisoner)
- Nelson Mandela, author of Long Walk to Freedom: The Autobiography of Nelson Mandela. Little Brown & Co; ISBN 0-316-54818-9 (paperback, 1995) (theme: overcoming apartheid in South Africa)
- Haing S. Ngor, author of A Cambodian Odyssey. (written with Roger Warner) 1987. New York: Macmillan Publishing Company. ISBN 0-446-38990-0 }(theme: denunciation of Khmer Rouge crimes)
- Lee Soon Ok, author of Eyes of the Tailless Animals: Prison Memoirs of a North Korean Woman. 1999. ISBN 0-88264-335-5 (theme: denunciation of Juche)
- Danylo Shumuk, author of Life Sentence: Memoirs of a Ukrainian Political Prisoner. 1984. Edmonton: University of Alberta. ISBN 0-920862-17-9
- Mohamedou Ould Slahi, author of Guantánamo Diary. 2015. Little, Brown, and Co. ISBN 978-0-316-32868-5 (theme: rendition, torture, interrogation, and captivity at the U.S. torture camp at Guantánamo Bay, Cuba)
- Aleksandr Solzhenitsyn, author of The Gulag Archipelago, 1918-1956: An Experiment in Literary Investigation. 1973. New York: Harper & Row. ISBN 0-06-013914-5 (theme: denunciation of Stalinism)
- Jacobo Timmerman, author of Preso Sin Nombre, Celda Sin Numero/Prisoner Without a Name, Cell Without a Number. 1985. Buenos Aires: El Cid. (themes: denunciations of Argentine rightist authoritarianism and anti-semitism)
- Leon Trotsky, author of My Life: An Attempt at an Autobiography. 1970. New York: Pathfinder Press. ISBN 0-87348-143-7 }(themes: denunciation of Tsarism, revolutionary inspiration) Note the interesting descriptions of political prison and internal political exile in Siberia under Tsarism.
- Loung Ung, author of First They Killed My Father: A Daughter of Cambodia Remembers. 2000. New York: Perennial. ISBN 0-06-093138-8 (themes: denunciations of Khmer Rouge brutality and racism)
- Mordechai Vanunu, author of Letters from Solitary, a book of letters from Vanunu to Rev. David B. Smith of Sydney, Australia. Vanunu is a political activist who exposed Israel's possession of nuclear weapons, was kidnapped by Mossad, tried in secret, and sentenced to eighteen years in prison. Available as PDFs: Light version - Full version with reproductions of each letter.
- Teo Soh Lung, author of Beyond the Blue Gate - Recollections of a Political Prisoner, a book on her imprisonment under the Internal Security Act of Singapore. 2011. Function 8 Limited. ISBN 978-981-08-8215-0 (pbk)
- Nicolae Steinhardt, The Journal of Joy (2024) written by a Romanian intellectual of Jewish origin, focuses on his conversion to Orthodox Christianity while incarcerated as a political prisoner by the Romanian communist regime ISBN 9780881417074.
