= Anna B. Sheppard =

Polish costume designer (born 1946)

- Born: Anna Biedrzycka; 18 January 1946 (age 80); Żyrardów, Poland
- Occupation: Costume designer
- Years active: 1971–present

Anna Biedrzycka Sheppard (born 18 January 1946) is a Polish costume designer. She received nominations for three Academy Awards, a BAFTA Award, and a César Award.

Sheppard is best known for her collaborations with directors Krzysztof Zanussi, Steven Spielberg, Roman Polanski, and Quentin Tarantino. She has also designed the costumes for several superhero films, including Captain America: The First Avenger (2011) and Spider-Man: Far From Home (2019). She has been nominated for the Academy Award for Best Costume Design three times.

On television, Sheppard designed costumes for limited series such as Band of Brothers (2001) and The Prisoner (2009).

== Early life ==
Sheppard was born in Żyrardów, Poland on 18 January 1946. She has a younger sister, Magdalena Biedrzycka, who is a fellow costume designer. She graduated with architecture from the Academy of Fine Arts, Warsaw and now lives in London.

== Career ==
Sheppard has been nominated three times for the Academy Award for Best Costume Design, for Schindler's List (1993), The Pianist (2002), and Maleficent (2014).

== Selected filmography ==
=== Film ===
Year	Title	Director	Notes
1971	Family Life	Krzysztof Zanussi	
1973	The Illumination	Krzysztof Zanussi	
1975	A Woman's Decision	Krzysztof Zanussi	
1976	Brunet wieczorową porą	Stanisław Bareja	
1977	Camouflage	Krzysztof Zanussi	
1978	Spiral	Krzysztof Zanussi	
1980	The Constant Factor	Krzysztof Zanussi	
1981	From a Far Country	Krzysztof Zanussi	
1982	Imperative	Krzysztof Zanussi	
1985	Power of Evil	Krzysztof Zanussi	
1988	To Kill a Priest	Agnieszka Holland	
1993	Schindler's List	Steven Spielberg	
1996	Dragonheart	Rob Cohen	with Thomas Casterline
1996	The Ogre	Volker Schlöndorff	
1997	Washington Square	Agnieszka Holland	
1998	The Proposition	Lesli Linka Glatter	
1998	Martha, Meet Frank, Daniel and Laurence	Nick Hamm	
1998	The Wisdom of Crocodiles	Po-Chih Leong	
1999	The Insider	Michael Mann	
2000	Circus	Rob Walker	
2000	Maybe Baby	Ben Elton	
2002	The Pianist	Roman Polanski	
2003	Shanghai Knights	David Dobkin	
2004	Around the World in 80 Days	Frank Coraci	
2005	Sahara	Breck Eisner	
2005	Oliver Twist	Roman Polanski	
2007	Hannibal Rising	Peter Webber	
2007	Fred Claus	David Dobkin	
2009	Inglourious Basterds	Quentin Tarantino	
2011	The Devil's Double	Lee Tamahori	
2011	Captain America: The First Avenger	Joe Johnston	
2013	The Book Thief	Brian Percival	
2014	Maleficent	Robert Stromberg	
2014	Fury	David Ayer	
2016	Now You See Me 2	Jon M. Chu	
2017	American Assassin	Michael Cuesta	
2018	Overlord	Julius Avery	
2019	Spider-Man: Far From Home	Jon Watts	
2020	Eurovision Song Contest: The Story of Fire Saga	David Dobkin	
2024	Bob Marley: One Love	Reinaldo Marcus Green	
2026	Supergirl	Craig Gillespie	

=== Television ===
Year	Title	Notes
1971	Behind the Wall	Television film
2001	Band of Brothers	10 episodes
2009	The Prisoner	with Jane Clive; 6 episodes

== Awards and nominations ==
Major associations

Academy Awards

Year	Category	Nominated work	Result	Ref.
1994	Best Costume Design	Schindler's List	Nominated	
2003	Best Costume Design	The Pianist	Nominated	
2015	Best Costume Design	Maleficent	Nominated	

BAFTA Awards

Year	Category	Nominated work	Result	Ref.
British Academy Film Awards
1994	Best Costume Design	Schindler's List	Nominated	

Miscellaneous awards

List of Anna B. Sheppard other awards and nominations
Award	Year (Note: Indicates the year of ceremony. Each year is linked to the article about the awards held that year, wherever possible.)	Category	Title	Result	Ref.
César Awards	2003	Best Costume Design	The Pianist	Nominated	
Costume Designers Guild Awards	2015	Excellence in Fantasy Film	Maleficent	Nominated	
Critics' Choice Awards	2010	Best Costume Design	Inglourious Basterds	Nominated	
Critics' Choice Awards	2015	Best Costume Design	Maleficent	Nominated	
Las Vegas Film Critics Society Awards	2009	Best Costume Design	Inglourious Basterds	Won	
Phoenix Film Critics Society Awards	2014	Best Costume Design	Maleficent	Nominated	
Polish Film Awards	2003	Best Costume Design	The Pianist	Won	
Satellite Awards	2015	Best Costume Design	Maleficent	Nominated	
Saturn Awards	1997	Best Costume Design	Dragonheart	Nominated	
Saturn Awards	2010	Best Costume Design	Inglourious Basterds	Nominated	
Saturn Awards	2012	Best Costume Design	Captain America: The First Avenger	Nominated	
Saturn Awards	2015	Best Costume Design	Maleficent	Nominated	
