= Martin Scorsese Presents: Masterpieces of Polish Cinema =

2014 film festival in Canada and U.S.

Martin Scorsese Presents: Masterpieces of Polish Cinema was a film series held in 2014 in the United States and Canada, curated by American director Martin Scorsese. In Polish, the program was titled Martin Scorsese prezentuje: arcydzieła polskiego kina.

== History ==
Scorsese initiated the project out of his long-standing fascination with the cinema of Poland. When accepting an honorary doctorate from the Łódź Film School, he acknowledged the profound influence that filmmakers such as Andrzej Wajda, Roman Polanski, and Jerzy Skolimowski had had on his own work, stating:

I cannot explain how your cinema—from Wajda, Polański, to Skolimowski, the whole lot—influenced my cinematic output. But it still does. At some point, I realized that when I wanted to make actors or cinematographers understand something, I showed them Polish films from the 1950s.

The immediate impetus for organizing a North American presentation of Polish classics was Scorsese's meeting with producer Jędrzej Sabliński in early December 2011 at Hotel Bristol, Warsaw.

Scorsese's admiration for Polish filmmaking, combined with the digital restoration of numerous Polish works, led to the creation of the touring retrospective Martin Scorsese Presents: Masterpieces of Polish Cinema. Scorsese personally selected the titles, which he regarded as some of the finest achievements in Polish film history. The series premiered on 5–7 February 2014 at the Film Society of Lincoln Center in New York City.

The North American tour featured 21 digitally restored films screened throughout 2014–2015 in 30 cities across the United States and Canada. The project's distribution partner was the American company Milestone Films.

=== United Kingdom ===
In 2015, Scorsese brought the idea to the United Kingdom, where 24 digitally restored classics of Polish cinema were presented, including several titles that had never before been shown in British theaters. The UK edition of the series opened in April 2015 at the Edinburgh International Film Festival and at BFI Southbank as part of the Polish Cultural Institute's KINOTEKA Polish Film Festival. Screenings continued through December 2015. The first film shown was Camouflage (Barwy ochronne) by Krzysztof Zanussi, one of three Zanussi films included in the program.

In addition to the 21 films available in the North American tour, the UK lineup featured three further titles: Knife in the Water (1962), Provincial Actors (1979) and Walkover (1965).

== List of movies ==
Source.

- Eroica (1957)
- The Last Day of Summer (1958)
- Ashes and Diamonds (1958)
- Night Train (1959)
- Knights of the Teutonic Order (1960)
- Innocent Sorcerers (1960)
- Mother Joan of the Angels (1961)
- The Saragossa Manuscript (1964)
- Salto (1965)
- Pharaoh (1966)
- To Kill This Love (1972)
- The Wedding (1973)
- Illumination (1973)
- The Hourglass Sanatorium (1973)
- The Promised Land (1974)
- Camouflage (1976)
- The Constant Factor (1980)
- Man of Iron (1981)
- Austeria (1982)
- Blind Chance (1987)
- A Short Film About Killing (1988)

United Kingdom additions:

- Knife in the Water (1962)
- Walkover (1965)
- Provincial Actors (1979)
