= Jerzy Nowak =

Polish actor and teacher

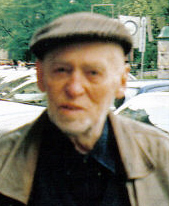
- Nowak in 2007
- Born: 20 June 1923; Brzesko, Poland
- Died: 26 March 2013 (aged 89); Warsaw, Poland
- Occupations: actor, teacher
- Spouse: Maria Andruszkiewicz-Nowak

Jerzy Nowak (20 June 1923 – 26 March 2013) was a Polish film and theatre actor and teacher.

== Biography ==
During World War II, Jerzy Nowak fought with the Polish partisans. According to Jan Güntner, Nowak was an executor of conspiracy death sentences of the Home Army, and he did not reveal after the end of the war in 1945. In 1948, Nowak graduated from the Ludwik Solski Academy for the Dramatic Arts in Kraków.

From 1994 on, Nowak primarily and continuously played the role of Singer Hirsch, who is a historic character in the legacy of Polish theater.

In cinema, he mostly took on supporting roles as a Jew, often set during World War Two, such as in Schindler's List (directed by Steven Spielberg), or as a 'bumpkin farmer' in Three Colors: White, and as the great creative Zucker in the film The Promised Land ( directed by Andrzej Wajda).

In 2005, he made a film on the subject of death, after allegedly learning of his own illness. In his will, his corpse was to be processed in formalin by Jagiellonian University Medical College. In 2007 the documentary Existence, directed by Marcin Koszalka focuses on the problem of death. The film attracted considerable media interest, and the rumors about the actor's disease has been denied.

In autumn 2009, Austeria Publishing House released the biography of Jerzy Nowak,Book of Love, written in collaboration with his wife, who in February 2010 was awarded the prize Kraków Book of the Month

He died on 26 March 2013, at the age of 89.

== Filmography ==
- Podhale w ogniu (1956)
- Zagubione uczucia (1957) - Shop assistant (uncredited)
- Dezerter (1958) - Klein
- The Eagle (1959) - Mate Sznuk
- Miejsce na ziemi (1960) - Doctor (uncredited)
- Spotkania w mroku (1960) - Worker
- Rok pierwszy (1960) - Mlynarz
- Kwiecień (1961) - Postman
- Koniec naszego świata (1964) - Blockfiihrer
- Nieznany (1964) - Camp Postman
- Pięciu (1964) - Alfred Buchta
- Lenin v Polshe (1966)
- Sobótki (1966)
- Kochankowie z Marony (1966) - Fisherman (uncredited)
- Jowita (1967) - participant dressed as a pirate prom
- Sciana czarownic (1967) - Bartender
- Cala naprzód (1967) - Chief of Boat
- Stajnia na Salvatorze (1968)
- The Shield and the Sword (1968)
- Kopernik (1973) - Uczestnik procesji mnicha Mateusza (uncredited)
- Opowiesc w czerwieni (1974) - Gamekeeper
- The Promised Land (1975) - Zucker
- Czerwone i biale (1975) - Zyd
- Zofia (1976) - Kelner w mordowni
- Ptaki, ptakom... (1977) - Barcik
- Amateur (1979) - Stanislaw Osuch, the head of Philip
- Sekret Enigmy (1979) - Alexander Cadogan
- Umarli rzucaja cien (1979) - Dziadek
- Szansa (1979) - Teacher Molda
- Placówka (1979) - Innkeeper Josef Szatzman
- Elegia (1979) - Old German
- The family Gąsieniców (1979, TV Series) - Szymek Polowacz
- Mission (1980, TV Series) - James Gutman
- Wsciekly (1980) - St. Okrzesik
- Zielone lata (1980)
- Na wlasna prosbe (1980) - Tomkowski
- Sowizdrzal Swietokrzyski (1980) - Florianek
- From a Far Country (1981) - Professor
- Krab i Joanna (1982) - Grzegorz Zaruba
- Do góry nogami (1983)
- Oko proroka (1984) - Jost Fok
- A Year of the Quiet Sun (1984) - English Doctor
- Nie bylo slonca tej wiosny (1984) - Josek
- Zánik samoty Berhof (1984) - Florian
- Mgla (1985) - Grandfather
- Przeklete oko proroka (1985)
- Medium (1985) - Ernest Wagner
- Wherever You Are... (1988) - Officer-Interpreter
- La bottega dell'orefice (1988) - Professor (uncredited)
- And the Violins Stopped Playing (1988) - Prof. Epstein
- A Tale of Adam Mickiewicz's 'Forefathers' Eve' (1989) - Choir
- Alchemik (1989) - Prince Kiejstut
- Kapital, czyli jak zrobic pieniadze w Polsce (1990) - Serafin
- Szwadron (1992) - Lejba
- Schindler's List (1993) - Investor #2
- Three Colors: White (1994) - the old farmer
- Legenda Tatr (1995) - Innkeeper
- Lagodna (1995) - Shopkeeper
- Gnoje (1995) - Old Man Hrycko
- Our God's Brother (1997) - Anthony
- Love Stories (1997) - Ankieter
- Egzekutor (1999) - Kozar
- Når nettene blir lange (2000) - Olek
- Quo Vadis (2001) - Christian Crispus
- The Hexer (2001, film) - Vesemir
- Gebürtig (2002) - Zwei alte Juden
- Eukaliptus (2002) - Pancho
- Julia returns home (2002) - Mieczyslaw 'Mietek' Makowsky
- The Hexer (2002, TV Mini-Series) - Vesemir
- The Revenge (2002) - Michal Kafar (bricklayer #1)
- Csoda Krakkóban (2004) - Grzegorz mester
- Scratch (2008) - Leon
- Children of Irena Sendler (2009, TV Movie) - Elderey Rabbi
- Mistyfikacja (2010) - Askenazy
- Legenda o Lietajúcom Cypriánovi (2010) - Bernard
- Obława (2012) - Wiarus
- Sierpniowe niebo. 63 dni chwaly (2013) - Leonard (final film role)

== Awards and prizes ==
- Partisan Cross (1964)
- Gold Cross of Merit (1979)
- Gold Medal for Merit to Culture – Gloria Artis (2008)
- Gold Badge "for his contribution to Kraków" (1977)
- Award at the Fourth National Festival of One Actor in Wrocław and in the one-woman show The real defense of Socrates Kostas Varnalisa in Old Theatre in Kraków (1969)
- Emphasis on XXVI Festival of Polish Contemporary Art in Wroclaw for the role of the Father in the play Bruno Henry Dederko, dir. Andruckiego Jack (1987)
- Award for the eighteenth Theatre in Opole Konfronracjach Opole for his role in The Marriage of the Jew Wyspiański, dir. Andrzej Wajda in the Old Theatre. Helena Modjeska in Cracow (1993)
- Grand Prize at XXX National Review Teatrrów Small Form Hirsch for his role in the play Singer I am a Jew from "The Wedding" by the story Roman Brandstaetter directed. Tadeusz Malak in the Old Theatre. Helena Modjeska in Cracow (1995)
- "Louis" – Kraków theatre community award for the title role in the play Mr. Paul Dorst in the Association of Theatre "Steam" (2001)
- Award for Comedy Festival Talia in Tarnów for his role in monodramie Womanish choice by The rock Podhale Casimir Break-Tetmajera from the Association "Moliere" in Cracow (2004)
- Kraków Book of the Month – the award for his book The Book of Love (2010)
