= Cinema of moral anxiety =

Polish film movement (1976–1981)

The cinema of moral anxiety (Polish: Kino moralnego niepokoju) was a short-lived (1976–1981) but influential movement in the history of the cinema of Poland. The term was also translated as "cinema of moral unrest", "cinema of moral concern", "cinema of moral dissent". Films of this movement portrayed the crisis of the regime in Communist Poland, usually in the setting of a provincial town. The development of the movement was abruptly stopped by the introduction of the martial law in Poland in 1981, and when it was lifted, the country was overwhelmed with powerful political and social processes which had eventually led to the fall of Communism in the country and the disappearance of the addressed social issues.

In addition, Jerzy Płażewski suggested the term "kino autentyzmu etosu" (cinema of ethos authenticity), while Mariola Jankun-Dopartowa suggested "kino nieufności" (Cinema of Distrust).

== Style ==
The style of the film may be demonstrated by one of the closing scenes of the film Camera Buff by Krzysztof Kieślowski: a single-take panoramic shot from nice facades of a row of houses to an alleyway, to dilapidated rear sides of the houses. Films of this kind did not have much drama, political machinations, or corruption. The problems of the regime were often exposed by showing stagnant lives of average people, with their struggles to earn the means for living in minimal comfort. In these films personal interests conflict with the stifling social and political environment.

== Film directors and films ==
- Piotr Andrejew
- Filip Bajon
- Feliks Falk
- Agnieszka Holland
  - Provincial Actors
- Krzysztof Kieślowski
  - 1976: The Scar
  - 1977: From a Night Porter's Point of View, documentary
  - 1979: Camera Buff
  - 1980: The Calm
- Janusz Kijowski
- Wiesław Saniewski
- Barbara Sass
- Andrzej Wajda
  - 1977: Man of Marble
  - 1978: Without Anesthesia
  - 1980: The Orchestra Conductor
- Krzysztof Zanussi
  - 1977: Camouflage
  - 1980: The Constant Factor
- Janusz Zaorski
- Tomasz Zygadło
  - 1980: The Moth

== See also ==
- Polish Film School
- Kabaret of Moral Anxiety
