= Maja Komorowska =

Polish actress (born 1937)

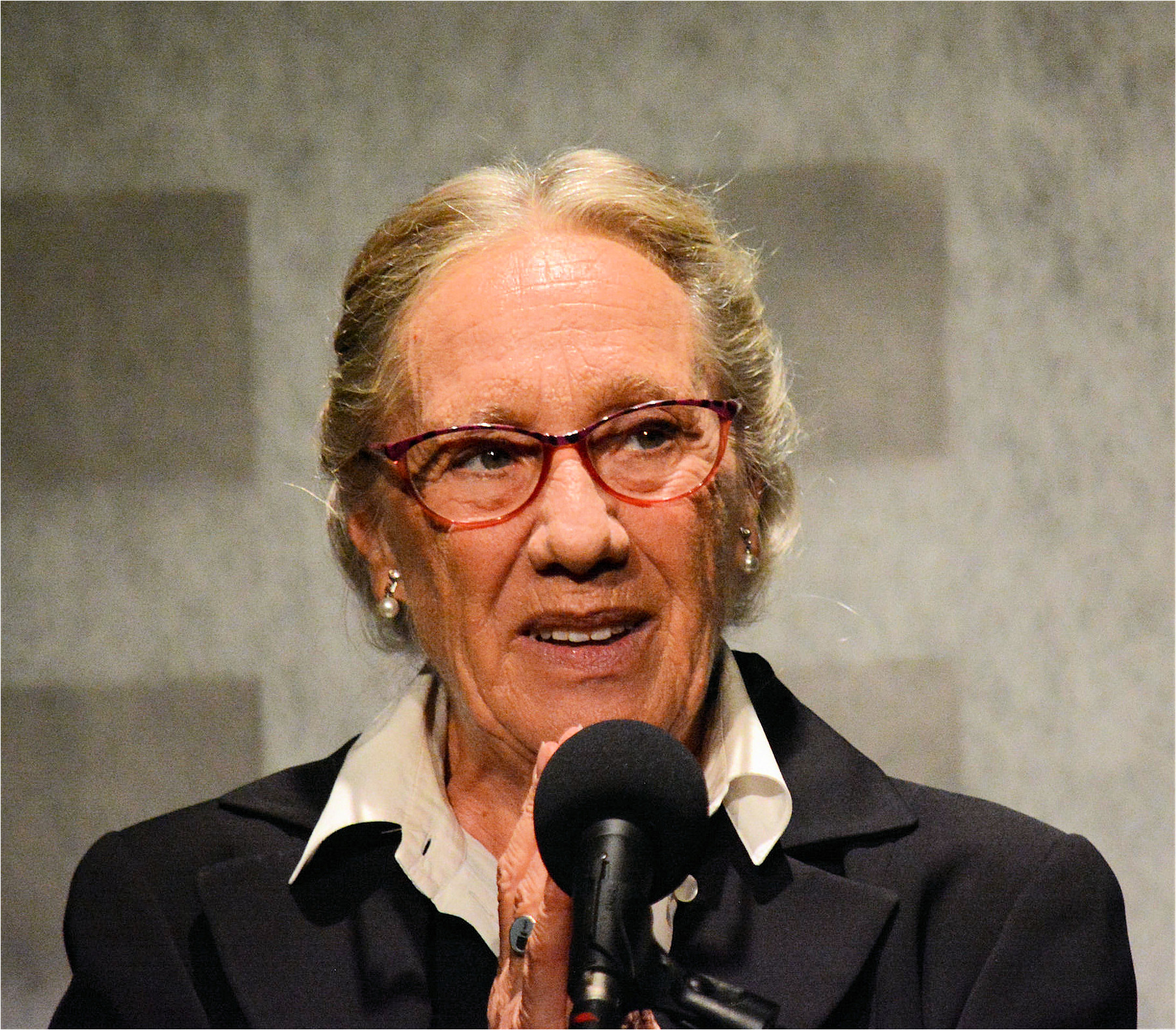
- Born: 23 December 1937 (age 88); Warsaw, Poland
- Occupation: Actress
- Years active: 1970-present

Maja Komorowska-Tyszkiewicz (born 23 December 1937) is a Polish film, stage and television actress. She received two Polish Film Festival Award for Best Actress for her roles in films A Woman's Decision (1975) and At Full Gallop (1996). In 2020 she received Life Achievement Award from the Polish Film Awards. From 1991 to 2016 she was professor in the Aleksander Zelwerowicz National Academy of Dramatic Art.

Known for works with directors Krzysztof Zanussi, Andrzej Wajda and Tadeusz Konwicki, Komorowska starred in films Family Life (1971), How Far Away, How Near (1971), The Wedding (1972), A Woman's Decision (1975), Spiral (1978), The Maids of Wilko (1979), From a Far Country (1981), Man of Iron (1981), A Year of the Quiet Sun (1984), Dekalog (1988), Lawa (1989), At Full Gallop (1996) and Katyń (2007).

== Filmography ==
- Family Life (1971)
- Behind the Wall (1971)
- How Far Away, How Near (1971)
- The Wedding (1972)
- A Woman's Decision (1975)
- Budapest Tales (1976)
- Spiral (1978)
- The Maids of Wilko (1979)
- Kontrakt (1980)
- From a Far Country (1981)
- Man of Iron (1981)
- A Year of the Quiet Sun (1984)
- Mit meinen heißen Tränen (1986)
- Decalogue I (1988)
- Inventory (1989)
- Lawa (1989)
- A Tale of Adam Mickiewicz's 'Forefathers' Eve' (1989)
- At Full Gallop (1996)
- Katyń (2007)
- Popieluszko: Freedom Is Within Us (2009)
- The Doll (2026)

== Honours and awards ==
- Gold Cross of Merit (1975)
- Grand Cross of the Order of Polonia Restituta (for outstanding contribution to national culture, for achievements in artistic creativity and teaching activities, 2011; Commander's Cross, 2004; Knight's Cross, 2000)
- Silver Medal of Merit for National Defence (2002)
- Gold Medal for Merit to Culture Gloria Artis – Award of the Minister of Culture and National Heritage in the theatre (2008)
