= Sławomir Idziak =

Polish cinematographer and director

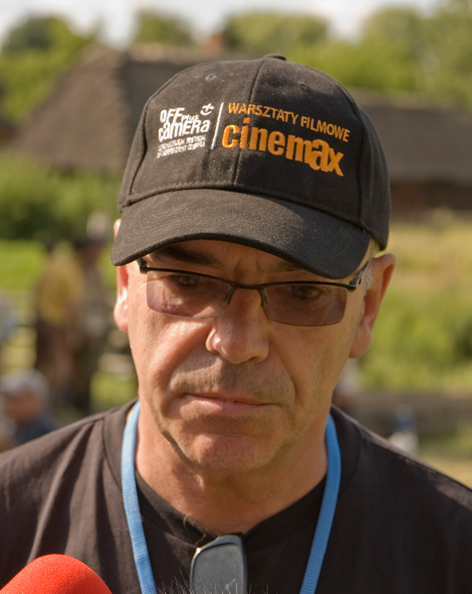
- Idziak in 2010
- Born: 25 January 1945 (age 81); Katowice, Poland
- Education: National Film School in Łódź
- Years active: 1966–2015
- Spouse: Maria Gładkowska (1999–2006)

Sławomir Andrzej Idziak (Polish pronunciation: [swaˈvɔmir ˈid͡ʑak]; born 25 January 1945) is a Polish cinematographer and director, known for his works in Polish and foreign films. He is especially known for his collaborations with director Krzysztof Kieślowski and Krzysztof Zanussi.

In 2019, the American Society of Cinematographers included Three Colours: Blue shot by Idziak on the list of the best-photographed films of the 20th century.

== Life and career ==
Idziak was born on 25 January 1945 in Katowice, Poland.

He had made fourteen films with Krzysztof Zanussi and early works from Krzysztof Kieślowski, including his television, feature film and foreign debuts.

Idziak has made films with directors such as Hark Bohm, Detlev Buck and John Duigan, and has also written and directed two films himself. He worked on Michael Winterbottom's film I Want You, where he won an Honourable Mention at the 48th Berlin International Film Festival.

He moved to more mainstream films including Gattaca (1997), Proof of Life (2000) and Black Hawk Down (2001), which earned him a nomination for an Academy Award and a BAFTA for Best Cinematography.

His last mainstream production was Harry Potter and the Order of the Phoenix. He then worked on Battle of Warsaw 1920, the first Polish-language feature film to be shot in 3D.

Idziak teaches at film schools in Berlin, London and Copenhagen, and also conducts seminars in cinematography in other countries. He is currently working on a Virtual Film Studio Web site called Film Spring Open which gives users an opportunity to present work to global audiences and to make films online. Participants can share ideas, exchange equipment or write scripts together. The aim is to create an international community of filmmakers who will support each other, make films together and will care about the advertising and distribution of their films.

In 2012, he was awarded the Order of Polonia Restituta for his "outstanding achievements for the Polish and world culture" and in 2014, he became the recipient of the Gold Medal for Merit to Culture – Gloria Artis.

== Personal life ==
Idziak was married to actress Maria Gładkowska.

== Filmography ==
=== Cinematographer ===
==== Feature film ====
Year	Title	Director	Notes
1969	Zbrodniarz, który ukradł zbrodnię	Janusz Majewski	With Antoni Nurzyński
1971	Jeszcze słychać śpiew. I rżenie koni...	Mieczysław Waśkowski	With Zdzisław Borowczyk, Jerzy Klimkiewicz, Edward Kłosiński and Wiktor Skrzynecki
1975	A Woman's Decision	Krzysztof Zanussi	
1976	Partita na instrument drewniany	Janusz Zaorski	
1976	The Scar	Krzysztof Kieślowski	
1978	Nauka latania	Himself	With Andrzej Popławski
1980	The Orchestra Conductor	Andrzej Wajda	
1980	The Constant Factor	Krzysztof Zanussi	
1981	From a Far Country	Krzysztof Zanussi	
1982	Imperative	Krzysztof Zanussi	
1984	Jagger und Spaghetti	Karsten Wichniarz	
1984	No Time for Tears: The Bachmeier Case	Hark Bohm	
1984	A Year of the Quiet Sun	Krzysztof Zanussi	
1985	Power of Evil	Krzysztof Zanussi	
1985	Wie ein freier Vogel	Hark Bohm	Documentary film
1986	Harmagedon - Erään maailman loppu	Juha Rosma	
1986	Sarah	Reginald Puhl	With Klaus Beckhausen, Michael Marszalek and Dragan Rogulj
1988	Yasemin	Hark Bohm	
1988	A Short Film About Killing	Krzysztof Kieślowski	
1988	Wherever You Are...	Krzysztof Zanussi	
1989	Inventory	Krzysztof Zanussi	
1991	The Double Life of Veronique	Krzysztof Kieślowski	
1993	Three Colours: Blue	Krzysztof Kieślowski	
1994	Weltmeister	Zoran Solomun	
1994	Traumstreuner	Erwin Michelberger	With Paul Ellmerer
1995	The Journey of August King	John Duigan	
1995	Tears of Stone	Hilmar Oddsson	With Sigurður Sverrir Pálsson
1996	Jailbirds	Detlev Buck	
1996	Lilian's Story	Jerzy Domaradzki	
1997	Commandments	Daniel Taplitz	
1997	Men with Guns	John Sayles	
1997	Gattaca	Andrew Niccol	
1998	I Want You	Michael Winterbottom	
1999	The Last September	Deborah Warner	
1999	Love and Rage	Cathal Black	
2000	Paranoid	John Duigan	
2000	Bundle of Joy	Detlev Buck	
2000	Proof of Life	Taylor Hackford	
2001	Black Hawk Down	Ridley Scott	
2004	King Arthur	Antoine Fuqua	
2007	Harry Potter and the Order of the Phoenix	David Yates	
2011	Battle of Warsaw 1920	Jerzy Hoffman	
2012	Measuring the World	Detlev Buck	
2015	A Tale of Love and Darkness	Natalie Portman	

==== Television ====
TV movies

Year	Title	Director	Notes
1969	Podróżni jak inni	Wojciech Marczewski	
1970	Cicha noc, święta noc	Marek Piestrak	Also writer
1971	Piżama	Antoni Krauze	
1977	Krótka podróż	Krzysztof Rogulski	
1977	Powrót	Filip Bajon	
1980	Meta	Antoni Krauze	With Edward Kłosiński
1980	Kontrakt	Krzysztof Zanussi	
1981	The Temptation	Krzysztof Zanussi	
1982	The Unapproachable	Krzysztof Zanussi; Edward Zebrowski	
1984	Bluebeard	Krzysztof Zanussi	
1988	Erloschene Zeiten	Krzysztof Zanussi	Documentary film
1990	Liebe und Maloche	Bettina Woernle	
1991	Long Conversation with a Bird	Krzysztof Zanussi	

=== Director ===
Year	Title	Director	Writer	Notes
1972	Pan Dziad z lirą	Yes	Yes	Documentary short Co-directed with Andrzej Kotkowski
1976	Nauka latania	Yes	Yes	
1983	Bajki na dobranoc	Yes	Yes	TV movie
1993	Enak	Yes	Yes	

== Awards and nominations ==
Year	Award	Nomination	Title	Result
2001	Academy Awards	Best Cinematography	Black Hawk Down	Nominated
2001	BAFTA Awards	Best Cinematography	Black Hawk Down	Nominated
1993	César Awards	Best Cinematography	Three Colours: Blue	Nominated
1996	Asia-Pacific Film Festival	Best Cinematography	Lilian's Story	Won
1996	Camerimage	Golden Frog	Lilian's Story	Nominated
1998	Camerimage	Golden Frog	I Want You	Nominated
1999	Camerimage	Golden Frog	The Last September	Nominated
2001	Camerimage	Golden Frog	Black Hawk Down	Nominated
2004	Camerimage	Outstanding Achievements in the Art of Cinematography		Won
2013	Camerimage	Lifetime Achievement Award		Won
1993	Venice Film Festival	Golden Osella for Best Cinematography	Three Colours: Blue	Won
2001	American Film Institute Awards	Cinematographer of the Year	Black Hawk Down	Nominated

== See also ==
- Cinema of Poland
- List of Poles
- List of Polish Academy Award winners and nominees
