= Andrzej Łapicki =

Polish actor

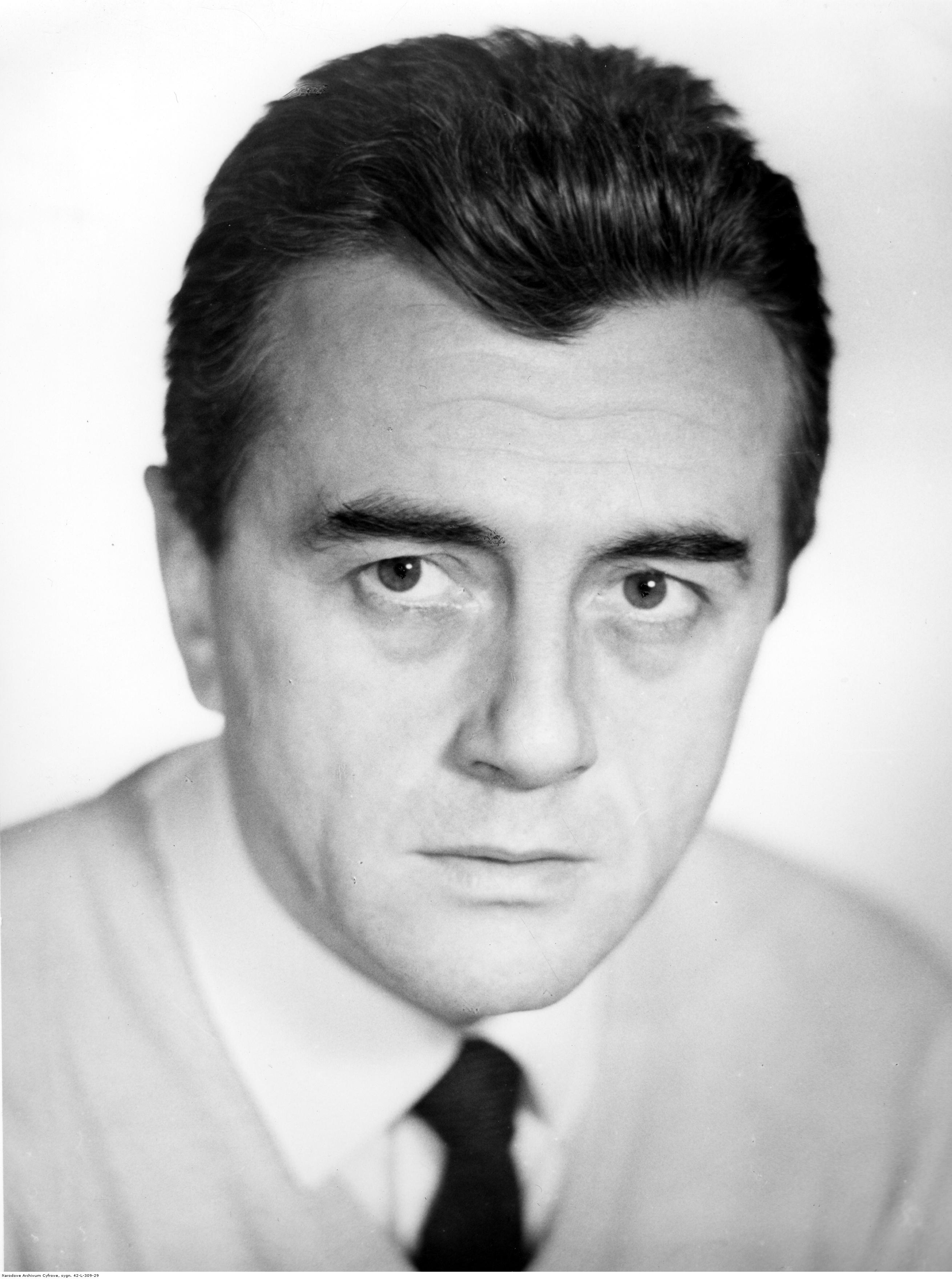
- Born: 11 November 1924; Riga, Latvia
- Died: 21 July 2012 (aged 87); Warsaw, Poland
- Occupation: Actor
- Years active: 1947–1999

Andrzej Łapicki (11 November 1924 – 21 July 2012) was a Polish film actor, theater director and actor. He enjoyed a long career, appearing in 50 films between 1947 and 1999. Łapicki also served a term in the Sejm as a member of KO "Solidarity" after the 1989 Polish elections.

Łapicki was born to Zofia (nee Fromont) and Borys Łapicki, a professor and lecturer of Roman law at the universities of Saratov and Yaroslavl. When the family left Soviet Russia in 1922, they travelled to Poland through Latvia, where Andrzej was born, and Lithuania, and later worked at the University of Warsaw and the University of Łódź. However, they maintained close contact with the part of the family that remained in Latvia and spent the summers with Łapicki's aunt in Rīgas Jūrmala. In his last years, he wrote columns in the Polish press, where he described his childhood memories from Latvia with very warm feelings.

Łapicki played a large amount of roles on Polish theater stages. As an actor and director, the work of the 19th century Polish comedy writer Aleksander Fredro was especially close to him. He was a tutor, and later, rector (1981–1987 and 1993–1996) of the National Academy of Dramatic Art in Warsaw.

He was married twice. His first marriage to Zofia Chrząszczewska lasted from 1947 to her death in 2005. He then married theatrologist Kamila Mścichowska in 2009 and remained with her until his death.

== Filmography ==
Year	Title	Role	Notes
1946	Dwie godziny	Lady's Date	Uncredited
1947	Zakazane piosenki	Conspirator	
1947	Jasne łany	Leśniewski	
1950	Dwie brygady	Stanisz, actor playing Lojza	
1950	Unvanquished City	SS Officer	
1953	Żołnierz zwycięstwa	John Lane	
1953	Sprawa do załatwienia	Narrator	Uncredited
1954	Domek z kart	Starosta	
1960	Powrót	Jurek 'Siwy'	
1961	Tonight a City Will Die	Piotr	
1962	Spotkanie w "Bajce" (aka Cafe from the Past)	Wiktor	
1963	Pamiętnik pani Hanki	Jacek Renowicki	
1963	Naprawdę wczoraj	Nowak	
1965	Życie raz jeszcze	Capt. Piotr Grajewski	
1965	Salto	Pietuch	
1966	Sposób bycia	Man	
1966	Lekarstwo na miłość	Andrzej	
1967	Gdzie jest trzeci król	Capt. Stefan Berent	
1968	Poradnik matrymonialny	Dr. Bogumil	
1968	Dancing w kwaterze Hitlera	Niemiecki turysta	
1968	Lalka	Kazimierz Starski	
1969	Everything for Sale	Andrzej	
1970	Jarzębina czerwona	Lt. Gorczyński	
1971	Epilog norymberski	R. H. Jackson	
1972	How Far Away, How Near	Andrzej	
1973	The Wedding	Poet	
1973	Zazdrość i medycyna	Dr. Tamten	
1975	The Promised Land	Trawiński	
1977	Sprawa Gorgonowej	Kulczycki	
1979	The Maids of Wilko	Doctor	
1980	Urodziny młodego warszawiaka	Jerzy's father Stanisław Bielecki	
1981	From a Far Country		
1982	Debiutantka	Jerzy	
1986	Dziewczęta z Nowolipek	Professor	
1987	W zawieszeniu	Dr. Ruczyński	
1988	Wherever You Are...	Hulanicki	
1989	Inventory	Tomek's Father	
1989	A Tale of Adam Mickiewicz's 'Forefathers' Eve'	Tzar	
1999	Pan Tadeusz	Priest	
