= Inventory (film) =

1989 Polish film

- Film poster
- Directed by: Krzysztof Zanussi
- Written by: Krzysztof Zanussi
- Starring: Krystyna Janda
- Cinematography: Sławomir Idziak
- Music by: Wojciech Kilar
- Release dates: 8 June 1989 (Moscow); 23 October 1989 (Poland)
- Running time: 103 minutes
- Country: Poland
- Language: Polish

Inventory (Polish: Stan posiadania) is a 1989 Polish drama film directed by Krzysztof Zanussi. It was entered into the 16th Moscow International Film Festival.

== Cast ==
- Krystyna Janda as Julia
- Artur Żmijewski as Tomek
- Maja Komorowska as Zofia
- Andrzej Łapicki as Tomek's Father
- Artur Barciś as Neighbour
- Tadeusz Bradecki as Priest
- Adam Bauman as Official
