= Anna Nehrebecka =

Polish actress and politician

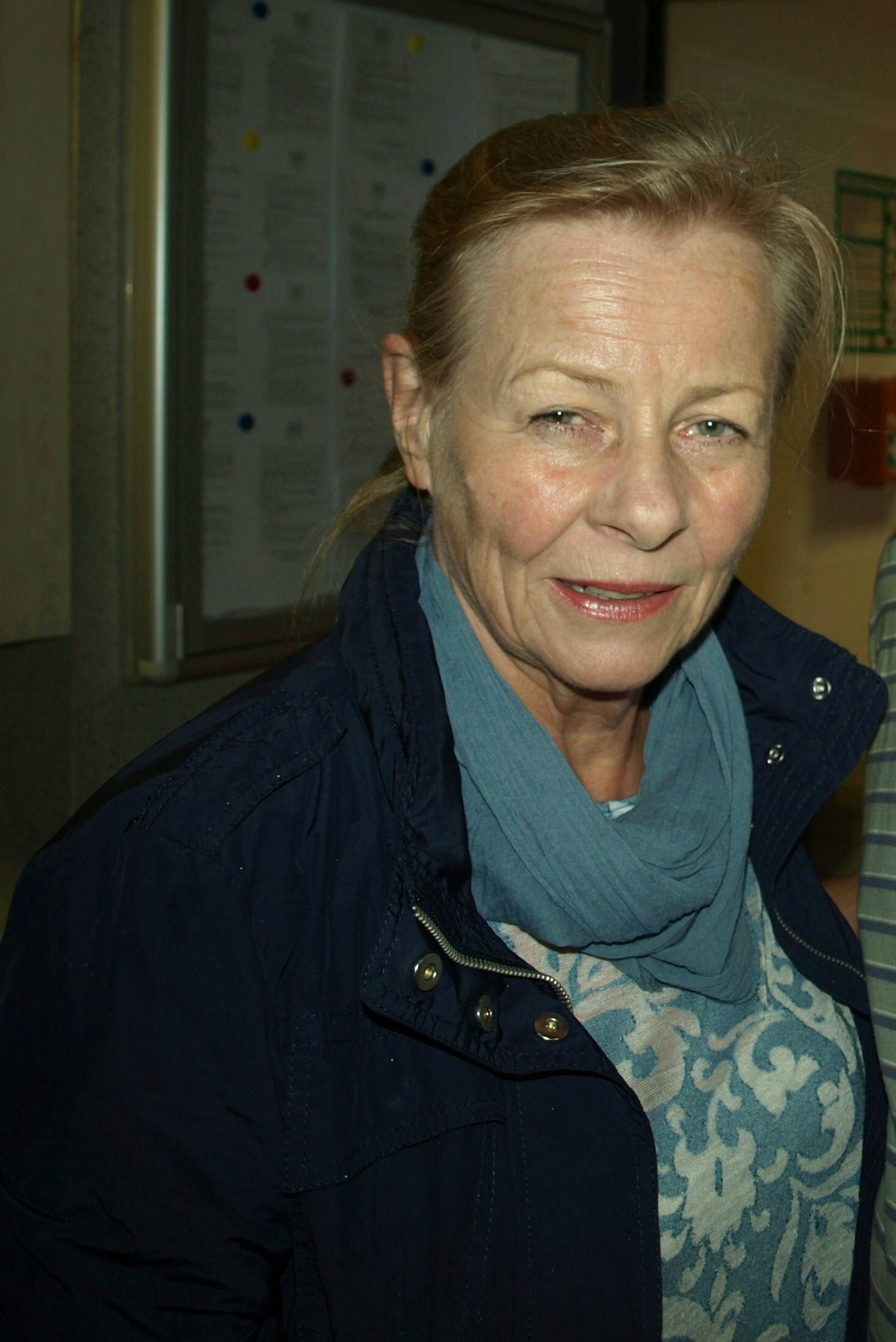
- Born: 16 December 1947 (age 78); Bytom, Poland
- Occupation: Actress
- Years active: 1969–present

Anna Nehrebecka-Byczewska (born 16 December 1947 in Bytom) is a Polish film actress and politician.

== Life and career ==
She was born Anna Wojciechowska. Her married surnames are Nehrebecka and Byczewska. In 1969 she graduated from the Theatre Academy in Warsaw, her film debut took place in 1967. In 1969 she became an actress of the Polish Theatre in Warsaw. She acted in many theatre, cinema and TV productions, classic as well as contemporary. She created poetry recitation programmes in radio and television. The series started in the 1970s, and included mainly poetry of Stanisław Baliński, Zofia Bohdanowicz, Ryszard Kiersnowski and Beata Obertyńska.

During the Martial Law in Poland in 1981-1983 she acted in churches and private apartments. She performed poetic concerts in Europe, Australia, New Zealand and in the United States.

She starred in movies produced in France and Hungary. She also appeared in an Albanian movie by Kujtim Çashku, "Kolonel Bunker" where she played one of the main roles - the Polish wife of an Albanian officer.

== Private life ==
Anna Nehrebecka is married to the Polish diplomat Iwo Byczewski.

== Selected filmography ==
- Duch z Canterville (1967, directed by Ewa Petelska)
- Podróżni jak inni (1969, directed by Wojciech Marczewski)
- Mały (1970, directed by Julian Dziedzina)
- Family Life (1971, directed by Krzysztof Zanussi)
- Copernicus (1972, directed by Ewa i Czesław Petelscy)
- TV series Droga (1973, directed by Sylwester Chęciński)
- The Promised Land (1974, directed by Andrzej Wajda)
- Doktor Judym (1975, directed by Włodzimierz Haupe)
- Nights and Days (1975, directed by Jerzy Antczak)
- Zanim nadejdzie dzień (1976, directed by Roman Rydzewski)
- Olśnienie (1976, directed by Jan Budkiewicz)
- TV series Polskie drogi (1976, directed by Janusz Morgenstern)
- Rytm serca (1977, directed by Zbigniew Kamiński)
- Kísértés (1977, directed by Károly Esztergályos)
- TV series Rodzina Połanieckich (1978, directed by Jan Rybkowski)
- Romans Teresy Hennert (1978, directed by Ignacy Gogolewski)
- Czułe miejsca (1980, directed by Piotr Andrejew)
- TV series Jan Serce (1981, directed by Radosław Piwowarski)
- Zasieki (1981, directed by Andrzej Piotrowski)
- TV series Najdluższa wojna nowoczesnej Europy (1982, directed by Jerzy Sztwiertnia)
- Marynia (1983, directed by Jan Rybkowski)
- Punkty za pochodzenie (1983, directed by Franciszek Trzeciak)
- Dom wariatów (1984, directed by Marek Koterski)
- Komediantka (1987, directed by Jerzy Sztwiertnia)
- Po upadku. Sceny z życia nomenklatury (1990, directed by Andrzej Trzos-Rastawiecki)
- Panna z mokrą głową (1994, directed by Kazimierz Tarnas)
- L'aube à l'envers (1995, directed by Sophie Marceau)
- Damski interes (1996, directed by Krzysztof Zanussi)
- Złotopolscy (1997, directed by Maciej Dutkiewicz, Janusz Dymek, Ireneusz Engler, Radosław Piwowarski, Janusz Zaorski)
- Kolonel Bunker (1998, directed by Kujtim Çashku)
- My Father's Bike (2012)
- Life Feels Good (2013)
- Raven (2018)
