= Behind the Wall =

Behind the Wall may refer to:

- Behind the Wall (2008 film), a horror film
- Destiny (1921 film) or Behind the Wall, a silent film
- Behind the Wall (1971 film), a Polish TV film by Krzysztof Zanussi
- "Behind the Wall", a song by Tracy Chapman from Tracy Chapman
