= Our God's Brother =

1997 film

- Directed by: Krzysztof Zanussi
- Screenplay by: Krzysztof Zanussi; Mario Di Nardo
- Story by: Karol Wojtyła
- Starring: Scott Wilson; Christoph Waltz
- Cinematography: Ryszard Lenczewski
- Edited by: Marek Denys
- Music by: Wojciech Kilar
- Release date: 1997
- Countries: Poland; Italy; Germany

Our God's Brother (Polish: Brat naszego Boga, Italian: Fratello del nostro Dio, German: Die Farbe des Lebens) is a 1997 drama film co-written and directed by Krzysztof Zanussi. A co-production between Poland, Italy and Germany, it is based on a play by Karol Wojtyła, the future Pope John Paul II, and it depicts real life events of priest and artist Albert Chmielowski.

The film premiered out of competition at the 54th edition of the Venice Film Festival.

== Cast ==
- Scott Wilson as Adam Chmielowski
- Christoph Waltz as Maksymilian Gierymski
- Wojciech Pszoniak as the Stranger
- Riccardo Cucciolla as the Monk
- Grażyna Szapołowska as Helena Modjeska
- Jerry Flynn as Lucjan
- Andrey Rudenskiy as Stanisław Witkiewicz
- Maciej Orlos as Jerzy
- Jerzy Nowak as Anthony
- Krzysztof Kumor as Wuj Józef
- Tadeusz Bradecki as the Theologue
- Andrzej Deskur as Young Adam Chmielowski
- Piotr Adamczyk as Hubert
- Krzysztof Janczar as Wiktor
