= Kontrakt =

- Written by: Krzysztof Zanussi
- Directed by: Krzysztof Zanussi
- Starring: Leslie Caron; Maja Komorowska; Tadeusz Łomnicki
- Music by: Wojciech Kilar
- Country of origin: Poland
- Original language: Polish

Production
- Cinematography: Slawomir Idziak
- Editor: Urszula Sliwinska
- Running time: 114 minutes

Original release
- Release: 17 November 1980

Kontrakt (English: The Contract) is a Polish drama telefilm written and directed by Krzysztof Zanussi. Starring Leslie Caron, Maja Komorowska and Tadeusz Łomnicki, the film was released in 1980.

== Plot ==
An arranged marriage between the offspring of two wealthy families is about to take place.

More than the union of the bride and groom, it is the union of their tradition-bound families. The bride and groom hardly know each other and do not get along well in their early interaction. The girl learns that her husband-to-be is an egoist and singularly career-minded. She walks out of the church. Unfazed, the groom's father takes the wedding guests to his villa for the expensive reception. Deals are made between corrupt officials on the sidelines, while the distraught son is taken to the hospital because of attempted suicide.

== Synopsis ==
Gifted Polish director Krzysz Zanussi's barbed social satire in Kontrakt may be lost in translation, quite literally. But he uses the scenario to critically look at society and the place of individual spirit in the late 1970s.

The story bears some resemblance to Anton Chekhov 1889 play The Wedding.

== Awards ==
At the Venice Film Festival, the film was the winner of the AGIS Award (Special Mention), UNICEF Award (Honorable Mention) and OCIC Award. It was also the 1981 Winner NBR Award in the category of Top Foreign Films.
