= Tadeusz Bradecki =

Polish actor and stage director (1955–2022)

Bradecki in 2016

Tadeusz Bradecki (2 January 1955 – 23 January 2022) was a Polish actor and stage director. He died on 23 January 2022, at the age of 67.

== Biography ==
He was born on 2 January 1955 in Zabrze. In 1977 he graduated from the Krakow Higher Theatre School. From the same year he worked at the Stary Theatre in Krakow (from 1990 to 1996 artistic director). Since 1998 — member of the Union of Theatres of Europe. Collaborated with the National Theatre in Warsaw. In 2001 he was awarded the Stanisław Ignacy Witkiewicz National Prize for popularizing Polish theatre culture abroad. Since 2003 he worked as artistic director of the Silesian Theatre in Katowice.

== Partial filmography ==
- Spirala (1978) as Student Doctor
- Camera Buff (1979) as Witek Jachowicz
- Hotel klasy lux (1979) as Klonowicz's son
- The Constant Factor (1980) as Witold
- From a Far Country (1981)
- The Issa Valley (1982) as Priest Peikswa
- A Year of the Quiet Sun (1984) as Interpreter
- No End (1985) as Hipnotyzator
- Wherever You Are... (1988) as Dr. Marcin
- Stan posiadania (1989) as Priest
- The Master and Margarita (1990, TV Series) as Jeszua
- Vítimas do Poder (1990) as Leszek
- Panny i wdowy (1991) as Zuzanna's husband
- Schindler's List (1993) as DEF Foreman
- Our God's Brother (1997) as Teolog
- Life as a Fatal Sexually Transmitted Disease (2000) as Monk Marek
- Suplement (2002) as Priest Marek
- The Welts (2004) as Doctor
- Karol: A Man Who Became Pope (2005, TV Movie) as Pralat Kurowski
- Persona Non Grata (2005)
- Zycie za zycie. Maksymilian Kolbe (2006) as Priest
- Drzazgi (2008) as Dean Walicki
- General Nil (2009) as Judge Emil Merz
- Rewizyta (2009) as Witold
- Lasting (2013) as Reader
- Obce cialo (2014) as Focolarino
- Ziarno prawdy (2015)
- Sprawiedliwy (2015) as Prior
- Eter (2018) as Doctor from Wien
- Eastern (2019) as Legal Counsel
- Zieja (2020) as Stefan Wyszynski (final film role)

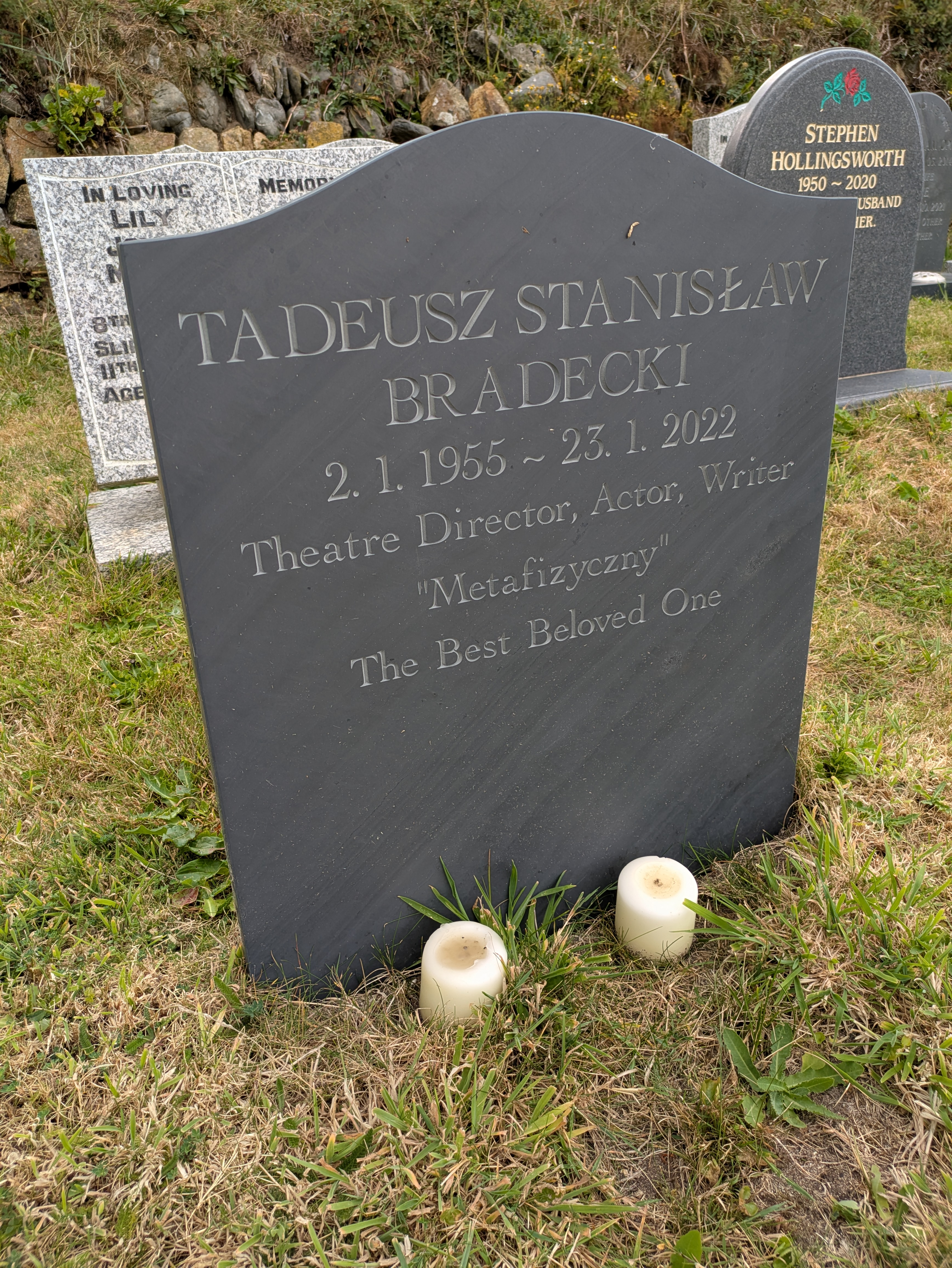

== Memorials ==
A memorial to Tadeusz Stanislaw Bradecki is located in the churchyard of the Church of St Winwaloe in Gunwalloe, Cornwall.
