= A Woman's Decision =

- Directed by: Krzysztof Zanussi
- Written by: Krzysztof Zanussi
- Starring: Maja Komorowska
- Cinematography: Slawomir Idziak
- Edited by: Urszula Sliwinska
- Music by: Wojciech Kilar
- Distributed by: Tinc Productions (USA)
- Release date: July 1975 (Berlin International Film Festival)
- Running time: 98 minutes
- Country: Poland
- Language: Polish

A Woman's Decision (Polish: Bilans kwartalny, also known as The Quarterly Balance) is a 1975 Polish drama film written and directed by Krzysztof Zanussi.

It is a movie about a woman stuck in an unhappy marriage, with neglectful husband who is distant and unable to make her happy. So she spends her life in limbo of waiting for happiness that is not coming. Eventually after many years of neglect, she feels in herself a need to change her life for the better. Soon she meets someone else, a new guy who can make her feel happy and loved,as she deserves. And then she needs to make a choice - will she stay with her husband out of sense of duty and because she is tired to try to love again someone new, or will she leave her unhappy marriage once for all. And she makes a wrong one - by choosing to stay. In melancholic, unhappy marriage, for the sake of duty.

So this movie is a psychological analysis of female character who wastes her life in waiting. For happiness in marriage that can not give her that. Instead of grabbing her happiness with someone new, who could really make her happy. As said above the movie is Polish.

The music in the movie is done by Wojciech Kilar, Polish film music composer, who is most famous for composing soundtrack for the movie Bram Stoker's Dracula.

It was entered into the 25th Berlin International Film Festival, where it won the OCIC Award.

== Cast ==
- Maja Komorowska as Marta
- Piotr Fronczewski as Jan
- Marek Piwowski as Jacek
- Zofia Mrozowska as Jan's Mother
- Halina Mikolajska as Roza
- Mariusz Dmochowski as Director
- Barbara Wrzesinska as Ewa
- Chip Taylor as James
- Eugenia Herman as Zofia
- Elzbieta Karkoszka as Maria
- Celina Mencner as Halina
- Krzysztof Machowski as Rower
- Malgorzata Pritulak as Anna
- Danuta Rinn as Marta's Colleague
- Kazimiera Utrata as Marta's Colleague
- Stefan Szmidt as Rescuer
- Dariusz Adamczuk
- Marian Friedmann
- Józef Fryzlewicz as Assistant Manager
- Antonina Girycz as Marta's Colleague
- Zbigniew Jankowski
- Krystyna Kolodziejczyk as Secretary
- Marcin Mroszczak
- Leszek Mystkowski
- Irena Oberska
- Joanna Poraska
- William Powers as Jacek's Colleague
- Alina Rostkowska
- Jan Sieradzinski
- Tadeusz Somogi as Manager
- Andrzej Szenajch as Jacek's Colleague
- Józef Wieczorek

== Critical reception ==
Roger Ebert gave the film four out of four stars, and wrote "Here's a film that has so much to say about one particular woman, and says it so eloquently, that nobody since Bergman has seen a woman character more clearly. The film is "A Woman's Decision," by Krzysztof Zanussi, who was already Poland's best director and now graduates to grandmaster class."
