= Imperative (film) =

- Directed by: Krzysztof Zanussi
- Cinematography: Slawomir Idziak
- Edited by: Liesgret Schmitt-Klink
- Music by: Wojciech Kilar
- Release date: 1982
- Country: Germany

Imperativ (internationally released as Imperative) is a 1982 German drama film written and directed by Krzysztof Zanussi.

The film entered the competition at the 39th Venice International Film Festival, where it received the Grand Jury Prize.

== Plot ==
Augustin is a mathematics professor with only a few students in his class. He is consistently searching for meaning in his life and challenging the fates, time, and nature. One night, with a key that his priest has given him to open the church at any time, he vandalizes a sacred icon, then admits to having done so. The priest is shocked. His wife Yvonne has been separating from him but comes back to him after he has a nervous breakdown and cuts off his finger. It's clear that Augustin is still caught in the web of existentialism, but Yvonne, for now, is willing to go along with him.

== Cast ==
- Robert Powell as Augustin
- Brigitte Fossey as Yvonne
- Sigfrit Steiner as the professor
- Matthias Habich as the theologist
- Leslie Caron as the mother
- Jan Biczycki as the orthodox priest
- Zbigniew Zapasiewicz as the psychiatrist
- Christoph Eichhorn as the student
