= Spiral (1978 film) =

1978 Polish film

- Directed by: Krzysztof Zanussi
- Written by: Krzysztof Zanussi
- Starring: Jan Nowicki
- Cinematography: Edward Kłosiński
- Edited by: Urszula Śliwińska
- Music by: Wojciech Kilar
- Release date: 1978
- Running time: 83 minutes
- Country: Poland
- Language: Polish

Spiral (Polish: Spirala) is a 1978 Polish drama film directed by Krzysztof Zanussi which tells the story of a stranger who turns up at a resort hotel in midwinter, behaves rudely towards other guests and disappears the next day. Found half-frozen in the snow he is taken to hospital where his story is gradually revealed. It was entered into the 1978 Cannes Film Festival.

== Cast ==
- Jan Nowicki - Tomasz Piątek
- Maja Komorowska - Teresa
- Zofia Kucówna - Maria
- Aleksander Bardini - Doctor
- Jan Świderski - Henryk
- Piotr Garlicki - Henryk's Son
- Marian Glinka - Physician
- Ewa Ziętek - Cleaning Woman
- Seweryna Broniszówna - Old Woman
- Andrzej Hudziak - Augustyn
- Marta Ławińska - Psychologist
- Cezary Morawski - Czarek
- Andrzej Szenajch - Guest House Manager
- Stefan Szmidt - Rescuer
- Daria Trafankowska - Nurse
