= A Year of the Quiet Sun =

1984 Polish film by Krzysztof Zanussi

- Directed by: Krzysztof Zanussi
- Written by: Krzysztof Zanussi
- Starring: Maja Komorowska; Scott Wilson
- Cinematography: Sławomir Idziak
- Edited by: Marek Denys
- Music by: Wojciech Kilar
- Distributed by: Film Polski; SPI International Poland (TV KinoPolska "Masterpieces of Polish Cinema")
- Release dates: September 1984 (VFF); 25 February 1985
- Running time: 110 minutes
- Countries: Poland; West Germany
- Languages: Polish; English

A Year of the Quiet Sun (Polish: Rok spokojnego słońca) is a 1984 Polish film written and directed by Krzysztof Zanussi and starring Maja Komorowska and Scott Wilson. It tells the story of a romance between a Polish woman and an American soldier in Poland, shortly after WWII.

At the 1984 Venice Film Festival, the film was awarded the Golden Lion and Pasinetti Awards. The film was nominated for 1986's Golden Globe Award for Best Foreign Language Film.

== Plot ==
In 1946, shortly after the end of World War II, Emilia (Maja Komorowska), a Polish woman who has returned to her homeland with her ailing mother, struggles to rebuild her life amid the physical and moral ruins of postwar Poland. She lives in a dilapidated town, trying to earn a modest living by baking and selling cookies, while caring for her mother’s fragile health.

Nearby, a U.S. military commission arrives to help exhume mass graves of Allied pilots murdered during the war; among them is Norman (Scott Wilson), an American soldier assigned as a driver for the commission.

Norman and Emilia meet by chance when he gives her a ride in his jeep. Though they come from different worlds and do not speak a common language, they are drawn together by mutual compassion and shared experiences of wartime loss. A tender romance gradually develops between them.

As their relationship deepens, Norman regularly visits Emilia and her mother, offering assistance and emotional support. However, Emilia remains torn: her love for Norman grows, but she feels duty-bound to stay behind with her mother, who depends entirely on her.

When Norman obtains orders to return to the United States, he invites Emilia and her mother to join him. Emilia seeks counsel from a priest and even considers leaving. Meanwhile, her mother—realizing she cannot endure the journey—passes away, in part exposing Emilia to the possibility of emigrating without her.

After her mother's death, Emilia tries to emigrate. She contacts a local smuggler (a “spedition agent”) to facilitate her passage. At the last moment, realizing that only one person can go, she sacrifices her own opportunity and gives the place to a neighbor, Stella, a local prostitute who is also a friend. As a result, Norman departs alone for America.

In the film’s final scenes, we see Emilia years later. She is living in an old-age home run by nuns. A letter arrives from America notifying her of an inheritance. As she attempts to travel—perhaps to finally go to the United States—she becomes physically unable to continue, losing consciousness with a suitcase in hand.

== Cast ==
- Maja Komorowska as Emilia
- Scott Wilson as Norman
- Hanna Skarżanka as Emilia's Mother
- Ewa Dałkowska as Stella
- Vadim Glowna as Herman
- Daniel Webb as David
- Zbigniew Zapasiewicz as Szary
- Zofia Rysiówna as Interpreter
- Janusz Gajos as Moonlighter
- Jerzy Stuhr as Adzio
- Gustaw Lutkiewicz as Bakery Owner
- Marek Kondrat as Malutki
- Jerzy Nowak as English Doctor
- Lee Michael Walczuk as US Captain Michael

== Production ==
The film was produced at the Wytwórnia Filmów Fabularnych (WFF) studios in Łódź, Poland, during a period of international co-productions in the early 1980s, alongside other notable works like Krzysztof Kieślowski's Blind Chance (1981). This era marked a "golden age" for Łódź as a film hub post-WWII, though the studios faced financial collapse by the early 1990s amid Poland's transition to a market economy. Zanussi's involvement as a studio head at TOR Film Production in the 1990s helped attract foreign interest, reflecting the film's role in bridging Polish and international cinema.

The film's dreamlike ending was shot in Monument Valley, Arizona, referencing John Ford's Stagecoach (1939), the only American film Emilia and her mother recall fondly. This location ties into characters' impressions of America from movies.

== Reception ==
Roger Ebert added the film to his Great Movies list and praised it as a “small, quiet film of enormous power” that avoids cheap romance, highlighting the postwar setting, the emotional and moral landscape, the performances (Wilson, Komorowska), and cinematography by Sławomir Idziak. Michael Wilmington of Los Angeles Times praised A Year of the Quiet Sun as a beautifully understated, deeply compassionate film that captures the harsh aftermath of war through human smallness rather than spectacle. He especially commended the emotional authenticity of the performances (notably Scott Wilson, Maja Komorowska, Hanna Skarzanka), the evocative visuals by cinematographer Sławomir Idziak, and Zanussi’s restraint in allowing love, pain, loss and moral ambiguity to emerge organically rather than sentimentally.

The Culture.pl review highlighted A Year of the Quiet Sun as one of Zanussi’s finest works—a restrained, mature love story set amid post-war devastation, where romance is tempered by trauma and sacrifice. It praises the nuanced performances and Sławomir Idziak’s evocative visuals, noting the film’s ambiguous, haunting ending. Dennis Schwartz praised the film as a "tender and sincerely acted love story" that creates a "desperate mood" amid post-war devastation. He commended Zanussi's "haunting direction" for navigating predictable elements effectively, Maja Komorowska's "warmth and sensitivity," and the film's "deeply human" observations on the human spirit, calling it a work that satisfies despite its deliberate pace.

== Legacy ==
The film marked a high point in Zanussi's international recognition, winning the Golden Lion at Venice in 1984. He returned to the festival 21 years later in 2005 with Persona Non Grata, after a period of relative absence from major global circuits. Critics have noted Zanussi's work, including A Year of the Quiet Sun, as continuing a tradition of ethical, human-focused cinema in the vein of Krzysztof Kieślowski, though often in his shadow, with a niche appeal to mature audiences interested in moral ambiguity rather than plot-driven narratives.

The film has been highlighted in retrospectives of Polish classics and is seen as emblematic of 1980s Polish films produced amid political oppression, including Zanussi's involvement in the pro-Solidarity movement.

== See also ==
- Cinema of Poland
- List of Polish language films
