= Mariusz Dmochowski =

Polish actor (1930–1992)

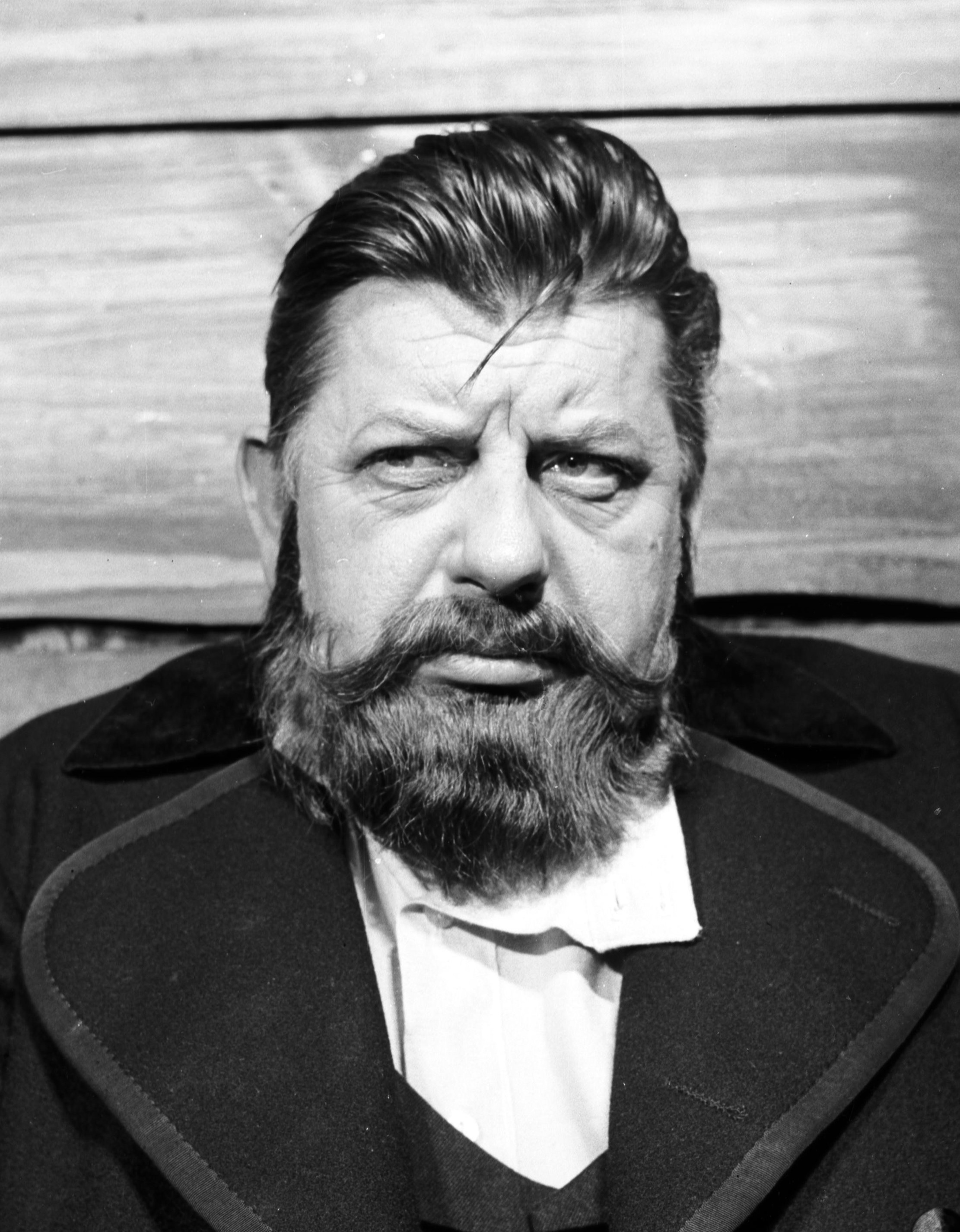
- Born: 29 October 1930; Piotrków Trybunalski, Poland
- Died: 7 August 1992 (aged 61); Popowo-Parcele, Poland
- Occupation: Actor
- Years active: 1958-1992

Mariusz Dmochowski (29 October 1930 – 7 August 1992) was a Polish actor. He appeared in more than 45 films and television shows between 1958 and 1992.

== Partial filmography ==
- Eroica (1958) - Lt. Korwin Makowski (segment "Ostinato Lugubre")
- Dezerter (1958) - Hauptsturmführer Franz Steiner
- Bad Luck (1960) - UB Officer
- Przeciwko bogom (1961) - Piotr Doron
- Swiadectwo urodzenia (1961) - Gestapo Officer (segment "Kropla krwi")
- Mezczyzni na wyspie (1962)
- Mój drugi ozenek (1964) - Marcin Szypula
- Panienka z okienka (1964) - Duke Jerzy Ossolinski
- Zawsze w niedziele (1966)
- Miejsce dla jednego (1966)
- Bicz bozy (1967) - Parish Priest
- Hrabina Cosel (1968) - August II
- The Doll (1968) - Stanislaw Wokulski
- Colonel Wolodyjowski (1969) - Jan Sobieski
- Prawdzie w oczy (1970) - inzynier Franciszek Zawada
- Zazdrosc i medycyna (1973) - Widmar
- A Woman's Decision (1975) - Dyrektor zakladu
- Hotel Pacific (1975) - Pancer (voice)
- Przepraszam, czy tu bija? (1976) - Olo
- Tredowata (1976) - Count Barski
- The Scar (1976) - Vorsitzender
- Mimetismo (1977) - Vice Dean
- Camouflage (1977) - Krynicki
- Golem (1980) - Holtrum, Rozyna's Father
- Ojciec królowej (1980) - King Jan III Sobieski
- Czule miejsca (1981)
- The War of the Worlds: Next Century (1981) - Head of TV Station
- Widziadlo (1984) - Huk / Priest
- O-Bi, O-Ba: The End of Civilization (1985) - Millionaire
- Milosc z listy przebojów (1985) - Stefan Ujma
- Cien juz niedaleko (1985) - Józef Wenda
- Rajska jablon (1986) - Filip
- C.K. dezerterzy (1986) - General
- Pilkarski poker (1989) - 'Powisle' Chairman Kmita
- Alchemik (1989) - Master Melchior
- Do widzenia wczoraj (1993) - Wladyslaw
