= How Far Away, How Near =

1971 film directed by Tadeusz Konwicki

- Directed by: Tadeusz Konwicki
- Written by: Tadeusz Konwicki
- Starring: Andrzej Łapicki; Maja Komorowska; Gustaw Holoubek
- Cinematography: Mieczysław Jahoda
- Edited by: Wiesława Otocka
- Music by: Zygmunt Konieczny
- Release date: May 5, 1972
- Running time: 93 min
- Country: Poland
- Language: Polish

How Far Away, How Near (Polish: Jak daleko stąd, jak blisko) is a 1971 film directed by Tadeusz Konwicki, released in 1972.

== Plot ==
Andrzej, a forty-year-old man, is tormented both by post-war trauma and by suicidal death of his friend. He sets off on a symbolic journey through past, present, and future to meet ghosts of childhood friends, parents, first love, first wife.

== Cast ==
- Andrzej Łapicki as Andrzej
- Maja Komorowska as Musia
- Gustaw Holoubek as Maks
- Anna Dziadyk as a strange girl
- Alicja Jachiewicz as Joasia, first wife of Andrzej

Source.

== Reception ==
Tadeusz Lubelski pointed it as the best Polish film ever made.

== See also ==
- Cinema of Poland
- List of Polish language films
