= Power of Evil =

- Directed by: Krzysztof Zanussi
- Written by: Krzysztof Zanussi
- Cinematography: Sławomir Idziak
- Music by: Wojciech Kilar
- Release date: 1985
- Language: French

Power of Evil (French: Le pouvoir du mal, Italian: Paradigma, also known as Paradigm) is a 1985 French-German-Italian drama film written and directed by Krzysztof Zanussi.

== Cast ==
- Vittorio Gassman: Gottfried
- Marie-Christine Barrault: Sylvie
- Benjamin Völz: Hubert
- Raf Vallone: Laboratory director
- Erika Wackernagel: Mutter
- Hans-Werner Marquardt: Alexander
- Hark Bohm: Notar
