= Camera Buff =

1979 film by Krzysztof Kieślowski

- Theatrical release poster
- Polish: Amator
- Directed by: Krzysztof Kieślowski
- Written by: Krzysztof Kieślowski
- Produced by: Wielislawa Piotrowska
- Starring: Jerzy Stuhr; Malgorzata Zabkowska; Ewa Pokas; Stefan Czyzewski
- Cinematography: Jacek Petrycki
- Edited by: Halina Nawrocka
- Music by: Krzysztof Knittel
- Release date: 16 November 1979 (Poland)
- Running time: 117 minutes
- Country: Poland
- Language: Polish

Camera Buff (Polish: Amator, lit. 'Amateur') is a 1979 Polish comedy-drama film written and directed by Krzysztof Kieślowski and starring Jerzy Stuhr. The film is about a humble factory worker whose newfound hobby, amateur film, becomes an obsession, and transforms his modest and formerly contented life. Camera Buff won the Polish Film Festival Golden Lion Award and the FIPRESCI Prize and Golden Prize at the 11th Moscow International Film Festival, and the Berlin International Film Festival Otto Dibelius Film Award in 1980.

== Plot ==
The film is set in the late 1970s in Wielice, People's Republic of Poland. Factory worker Filip Mosz (Jerzy Stuhr) is a nervous new father and a doting husband when he begins filming his daughter's first days with a newly acquired 8mm movie camera. He believes, as he tells his wife, that he now has everything he ever wanted since his youth as an orphan, but when the local Communist Party boss asks him to film a celebration event of the jubilee of his plant, his fascination with the possibilities of film begins to transform his life.

When they see his film, his superiors find his shot of a pigeon useless and his shots of several negotiators at a business meeting too probing. His boss suggests that Filip cut the shots of the entertainers being paid, the men going to the bathroom, and the business meeting. (He allows Filip to keep the pigeons as long as the shot of entertainers being paid is taken out.) He submits the film to a festival and gains third prize, effectively second prize because the festival did not award a first prize, feeling that no work was deserving. He is given an award as an incentive to keep filming. He starts to neglect his responsibilities to his family as his attention fixes on Anna Wlodarczyk, an attractive, self-described "amatorka" (amateur) who encourages Filip's filmmaking, on the activities he films, and on the world of cinephiles.

The Kraków TV station airs Filip's film about a dwarf working at the factory and another about misallocated town renovation funds. Filip's boss reprimands him: work on the new nursery school will have to stop because of his exposé, and Stasio Osuch, the head of the works council and Filip's mentor, will lose his job. After that, Filip retrieves the canister for his as-yet undeveloped film about the brickyard, which he has learned is not operating due to lack of materials, with the workers being secretly employed on other town projects, opens it and tosses the film out to be exposed to the light. Alone at home, his wife having left the relationship with their daughter due to his obsession with filming rather than his family, Filip now turns his 16mm camera on himself.

== Cast ==
- Jerzy Stuhr as Filip Mosz
- Malgorzata Zabkowska as Irka Mosz
- Ewa Pokas as Anna Wlodarczyk
- Stefan Czyzewski as Director
- Jerzy Nowak as Stanislaw Osuch
- Tadeusz Bradecki as Witek Jachowicz
- Marek Litewka as Piotrek Krawczyk
- Boguslaw Sobczuk as Kedzierski
- Krzysztof Zanussi as himself
- Andrzej Jurga as himself
- Alicja Bienicewicz as Jaska
- Tadeusz Rzepka as Wawrzyniec
- Aleksandra Kisielewska as Hania, secretary
- Wlodzimierz Maciudzinski as Stelmaszczyk
- Roman Stankiewicz as Czeslaw
- Antonina Barczewska as Katarzyna
- Feliks Szajnert as Doctor
- Jolanta Brzezinska as Wawrzyniec's wife
- Teresa Szmigielówna as herself
- Jacek Turalik as Buczek
- Andrzej Warchal as TV editor (as Andrzej Warchol)
- Danuta Wiercinska as Grazyna (as D. Wiercinska)
- Tadeusz Huk as doctor on duty

== Analysis ==
Camera Buff explores censorship in Communist Poland and its repression of the individual's expression of his observations. Filip also confronts the consequences of a man who discovers new possibilities and finds his former world, which had been so fulfilling before he'd discovered filmmaking, rendered dull, old, and limited.

Krzysztof Kieślowski emphasizes the power of film through various scenes in Camera Buff. Filip's moviemaking allows his grieving friend to watch a short clip of his late mother waving from a window and of himself cheerfully driving a hearse and waving to the camera. When he films the story of a diminutive factory worker and then shows him the result, the worker is overcome with emotion by Filip's ability to give voice and an arc to an otherwise ordinary, unexceptional life. Filip finds that with its ability to create comes film's ability to destroy when he tries to air a film clip of his which aims to quietly expose Party corruption. The clip turns out to be misinformed and results in the dismissal of one of his supporters from his job, an unfortunate consequence of his uninformed reporting, the Party's secrecy, and Communist Poland's culture of censorship.

The film ends with Filip turning the camera on himself, realizing too late that all along he should have reflected on the consequences of his camera obsession on himself, his life, and his family.

== Production ==
=== Filming locations ===
- Kraków, Malopolskie, Poland
- Warsaw, Mazowieckie, Poland
- Wytwórnia Filmów Fabularnych, Lódz, Lódzkie, Poland (studio)

=== Soundtrack ===
- "Walc e-moll" (Frédéric Chopin) by Krystian Zimmermann
- "Staropolskim obyczajem" (J. Odrowaz, A. Skorupka, W. Kruszynski) by Zofia & Zbigniew Framer

== Reception ==
=== Critical response ===
Camera Buff received mixed reviews. In his review in The New York Times, Vincent Canby argued that much of the film "means to be uproariously emotional, but the events we see seldom justify all the overwrought reactions. Mr. Kieślowski also appears to suggest that art—in this case movie making—must be a process by which the artist consumes the raw materials of his experience and then spits them out as finished art, leaving the people around him in the state of gnawed beef bones. This is a vast oversimplification of the creative process and is probably only applicable, really, to the second-rater." Canby noted, however, that the film was "exuberantly acted by a good cast headed by Mr. Stuhr." Jonathan Rosenbaum of the Chicago Reader wrote about the film "Suffused with Kieslowski's dry wit and intelligence, this early feature provides an excellent introduction to his work." On the review aggregator website Rotten Tomatoes, Camera Buff holds an approval rating of 90% based on 10 reviews, with an average rating of 7.3/10.

Polish director Krzysztof Zanussi (director of the Lodz Film School when Kieslowski was his deputy director) explains that there was a period before the success of Camera Buff outside Poland when Kieślowski's work was considered inappropriate to travel internationally. Zanussi argues that Kieślowski's work always had universal appeal, and that the praise or scorn seemed, to Zanussi, to be arbitrary. For example, after Kieślowski gained acclaim for films he made in the West — The Double Life of Veronique and the Three Colors Trilogy — his earlier films, which had been largely damned by western reviewers and critics, were suddenly praised as a collective body.

=== Awards and nominations ===
- 1979 Polish Film Festival Golden Lion Award (Krzysztof Kieślowski) Won
- 1979 Polish Film Festival Best Actor Award (Jerzy Stuhr) Won
- 1979 Moscow International Film Festival FIPRESCI Prize (Krzysztof Kieślowski) Won
- 1979 Moscow International Film Festival Golden Prize (Krzysztof Kieślowski) Won
- 1980 Berlin International Film Festival Interfilm Award, Otto Dibelius Film Award (Krzysztof Kieślowski) Won
- 1980 Chicago International Film Festival Golden Hugo (Krzysztof Kieślowski) Won
