= The Illumination =

- Directed by: Krzysztof Zanussi
- Written by: Krzysztof Zanussi
- Starring: Stanislaw Latallo Monika Dzienisiewicz-Olbrychska Malgorzata Pritulak
- Music by: Wojciech Kilar
- Release date: 1973
- Country: Poland

The Illumination (pl: Iluminacja) is a 1973 Polish film written and directed by Krzysztof Zanussi. The film contains elements of Zanussi's "intellectual biography", as well as documentary elements, e.g., appearances of philosopher Władysław Tatarkiewicz (cast as himself).

== Plot ==
The film follows the life of Franciszek Retman (Franek), as he is accepted into college to study physics. He meets a fellow student and they become a couple; however, after a party in which Franek accepts a joint of cannabis, he returns to her apartment to find her being assaulted by another man. He intervenes, is beaten, and his girlfriend suddenly rebuffs him and breaks up with him, throwing him out on the street. He then is shown with other students vacationing in a mountain lodge, planning a climb to the peak, and has his first experience with death after his friend dies while climbing. He later visits the corpse at night, studying it with a burning match. At this lodge, he meets and falls in love with Małgosia, a fellow student, and they elope.

After a discussion with a professor about his future, he comes to the sobering realization that his academic path must accelerate if he is to become notable in any way - interspersed with slides describing the young ages of famous physicists such as Einstein and Planck when they achieved their first academic positions. Later, as Franek serves a period of mandatory military service, Małgosia comes to him and tells him she is pregnant; Franek immediately marries Małgosia and the child is born. However, due to the financial stress of the child, Franek must leave college and work in a hospital, evaluating medical equipment, participating in sleep studies for extra money, and eventually becoming a full orderly. During the sleep studies he dreams of being trapped in a courtyard, with strangers looking down at him from windows while a man with an axe chases Małgosia and his child. He assists with brain surgeries, in studies attempting to cure schizophrenia and the use of electrodes to stimulate portions of the brain. He becomes friends with a patient, a mathematician, suffering from a tumor that causes epileptic fits. After a surgery to remove the tumor, the mathematician dies, and Franek assists a colleague in his autopsy. Franek asks what will happen with the brain, to which he is told that it will be put into the archives as a textbook example of a tumor; disgusted by his colleague's detached attitude towards his friend's brain, Franek steals the organ and destroys it.

He then goes to a monastery, seeking answers to existential questions sparked by his experiences with death; after he leaves, he dreams that a monk has died and is entombed, before a montage of the rotting corpses of others in the catacombs is played. Reentering college, he earns his doctorate, working as a researcher and lecturer as time passes rapidly; notably, he and other intellectuals hear news of the 1968 Polish political crisis on the radio. Finally having published his first paper, he collapses while playing with his son; at the doctor, he is told that he has developed heart issues from old age, and that he "should not expect things to get better, ever again, like they used to." Disturbed by the realization that he has passed the prime of his life, at the riverside with his wife and son, he watches driftwood float downstream.

The film is interspersed with scenes associated with education and intellect, lecturers speaking to the camera about existential topics of physics and biology such as the nature of time or the existence of self, and chalkboard drawings of still images alluding to events in the film (such as a series of medical images describing Małgosia's pregnancy.)

== Strongly anti-communist political character ==
Despite the movie was made during the Golden Age of the Communist Party in Poland in 1973 which even aspired at that time to be the Hydrogen bomb nuclear power independently of the Soviet Union on its own under the rule of the First Secretary of the Polish United Workers Party (PZPR) Edward Gierek which was suppressing the free speech and the freedom of expression with the harsh censorship and repressions and is strictly fictional Zanussi managed to smuggle strong hidden messages against to Polish communist regime and the Polish communist military government. The whole person of Franciszek Retman is portrayed as physically weak and with the shy personality and personal poor life problems as the contrast against the brutality of the communist system which is the hidden message of what could happen to him if he openly opposed the communist government. Retman is constantly struggling with the poverty induced by the communist system oriented into the Cold War economy trying to find the almost impossible balance between the family and the private life and the Physics studies what is strongly damaging and delaying his career as the young Physicists while being on hunger stipends and he must work in between to support his family. The scene showing injuries of his friend falling from the mountain while climbing may be a strong allusion to beating or even shooting by the communist police and his climbing the allusion that too demonstrative climbing of the personal career in communist Poland may lead to being noticed by the authorities and may lead to this. Also the scene sequence for example of Retman marching in the Polish Peoples Army under the compulsory military service just after the scene of having shy sex with his girlfriend who later visits him in military barrack during service asking for money for abortion which he strongly disallows portraits the service as form of punishment for having personal relation and private life in communism. Another scene is when Retman is looking with some hope at the window after hearing about the students civil unrest against government at the university in 1968. All these elements make Zanussi's movie a strong critique of the communist Poland where the poor individual and especially the aspiring scientist Physicist is powerless and may be subjected to violence above values.

== Awards ==
- 1973 – Locarno International Film Festival (Golden Leopard)
- 1974 – Gdynia Film Festival (special award)
