= Behind the Wall (1971 film) =

- Written by: Krzysztof Zanussi; Edward Zebrowski
- Directed by: Kszysztof Zanussi
- Starring: Maja Komorowska; Zbigniew Zapasiewicz; Eugenia Herman
- Country of origin: Poland
- Original language: Polish

Production
- Cinematography: Jan Hesse
- Editor: Urszula Sliwinska
- Running time: 56 minutes

Original release
- Release: 19 October 1971

Behind the Wall (Original title: Za ścianą) is a Polish drama telefilm directed and co-written by Kszysztof Zanussi. Starring Maja Komorowska, Zbigniew Zapasiewicz and Eugenia Herman, this 56-minute film was released in 1971.

== Plot ==
Jan is a young assistant professor who is an organised workaholic and career-centered academic. He shuns the company of other people and lives to pursue his career.

Anna, a disorganized, depressed and unsuccessful PhD student, lives in the same building. After a setback, she turns to Jan for advice in a state of fragility, uncertainty and nervous exhaustion. She invites him over for tea at her place. The short meeting is clumsy for them both and leaves a mark on their lives. Jan tries to be helpful but does not grasp the extent of the Anna's deep anguish or her need for human compassion, even as she makes a more dramatic statement about that. He reverts to his own quarters. These two people who are both alone and lonely have nothing to say to each other. It is clear that they will remain strangers to each other. Anna unsuccessfully tries to take her own life and Jan visits her in the hospital.

== Synopsis ==
The film touches upon difficult issue regarding connecting across barriers of misunderstanding, self-absorption and the inability to build relationships as it portrays two young people who live alone next to each other. It is the emotional intensity that two great actors create that makes it difficult to ignore the sad little story as it unfolds. The nuance with which the film has been put together and the performance by Komorowska and Zapasiewicz invites for this film comments like "one of the best productions in the history of Polish television" or a "riveting and hauntingly real little film".

== Trivia ==
- Za ścianą is an early-career TV production from the gifted Krzysztof.
- The 56-minute black-and-white film was shot in Warsaw (Poland).
- The film won the best actress award (Maja Komorowska) at the San Remo International Film Festival 1971.

== Themes ==
"The motif of a woman's loneliness and helplessness is conveyed through the closed space - the ' wall ' metaphor.", according to Agnieszka Bron and Michael Schemmann.
