= Salto (film) =

1965 film by Tadeusz Konwicki

- Directed by: Tadeusz Konwicki
- Written by: Tadeusz Konwicki
- Starring: Zbigniew Cybulski, Gustaw Holoubek
- Cinematography: Kurt Weber
- Edited by: Irena Choryńska
- Music by: Wojciech Kilar
- Release date: 1965
- Running time: 104 minutes
- Country: Poland
- Language: Polish

Salto is a 1965 Polish drama film written and directed by Tadeusz Konwicki. It was released on 11 June 1965 in Poland. The director of photography is Kurt Weber and the music is by Wojciech Kilar. The title can be translated as "somersault" in English, or it can be seen as a reference to a rhythmic dance movement. The film received an Honorary Diploma at the Edinburgh International Film Festival, 1967.

== Plot ==
The film tells the story of a man who jumps off a train into a sparsely populated town. He is "a crazy guy who drops into a kind of ghost town and tells various cockamamie stories, and the citizens aren't sure if they remember him or not". The crazy man "claims to have hidden in this town during the war", and he confronts a number of people, being "alternately hostile, tender, understanding, accusing, cowering, [and] passive-aggressive"; but the townspeople do not seem to remember him.

== Style ==
The film is "mostly a lot of curious confrontations, both intellectual and earthy, conveyed in a fluid camera style with disorienting transitions". The film uses a "graceful combination of fluid camera work within each scene and disorienting jump cuts between scenes, which give the whole thing its dreamlike flow". The film depicts a Poland which is "irrevocably haunted" by war. In the film, the "memories of a wartime execution are no longer flashbacks but appear as a series of nightmarish dreams, edging closer and closer to reality". The film is "a commentary on the complex fate of his generation". It has been described as Kafkaesque.

== Cast ==
- Zbigniew Cybulski as Karol Kowalski vel Malinowski
- Gustaw Holoubek as the Host
- Marta Lipińska as Helena
- Irena Laskowska as Cecylia
- Wojciech Siemion as the Artist
- Włodzimierz Boruński as Blumenfeld
- Andrzej Łapicki as Pietuch
- Jerzy Block in the role of the Old man
- Zdzisław Maklakiewicz as Rotmistrz
- Iga Cembrzyńska

== Music ==
The score by Wojciech Kilar includes a "stately, delicate piano piece" during the opening credits. While there is "no background music during the film", the climax of the story depicts a town festival at which a "small band of piano, drums, double-bass, guitar, clarinet and trumpet" plays a "beautiful waltz" and the "title dance, the salto", which has a "driving rhythm".
