= Family Life (1971 Polish film) =

1971 Polish film

- Directed by: Krzysztof Zanussi
- Written by: Krzysztof Zanussi
- Starring: Daniel Olbrychski
- Cinematography: Witold Sobocinski
- Edited by: Urszula Sliwinska
- Music by: Wojciech Kilar
- Release date: 24 September 1971
- Running time: 88 minutes
- Country: Poland
- Language: Polish

Family Life (Polish: Życie rodzinne) is a 1971 Polish drama film written and directed by Krzysztof Zanussi. It was entered into the 1971 Cannes Film Festival. The film was also selected as the Polish entry for the Best Foreign Language Film at the 44th Academy Awards, but was not accepted as a nominee.

== Plot ==
A young engineer named Ziemowit Braun, known as Wit, receives a telegram summoning him home due to his father's illness. Wit left home six years ago and has had no contact with his family since then. He arrives at his family's dilapidated estate accompanied by Marek, a friend from university.

At home, the men find his father, who has a drinking problem (before the war, he owned a glassworks) and now spends most of his time distilling moonshine, living with his sister-in-law, who acts as his housekeeper, and his daughter Bella, an unemployed neurotic. All three, dissatisfied with their lives, try to persuade Wit to stay with them and take over a small workshop producing Christmas tree baubles. Marek watches the family drama with embarrassment.

== Cast ==
- Daniel Olbrychski - Ziemowit Braun, called Wit
- Maja Komorowska - Bella Braun
- Jan Kreczmar - Father of Ziemowit and Bella
- Halina Mikolajska - Jadwiga, aunt of Ziemowit and Bella
- Jan Nowicki - Marek
- Anna Milewska - translator
- Jerzy Bińczycki - Wit's boss
- Barbara Sołtysik - Wit's co-worker
- Wiesław Kornak - Wit's co-worker
- Barbara Kobrzyńska - secretary
- Karol Strasburger - man
- Anna Nehrebecka - woman

== See also ==
- List of submissions to the 44th Academy Awards for Best Foreign Language Film
- List of Polish submissions for the Academy Award for Best Foreign Language Film
