= Tadeusz Konwicki =

Polish writer and film director

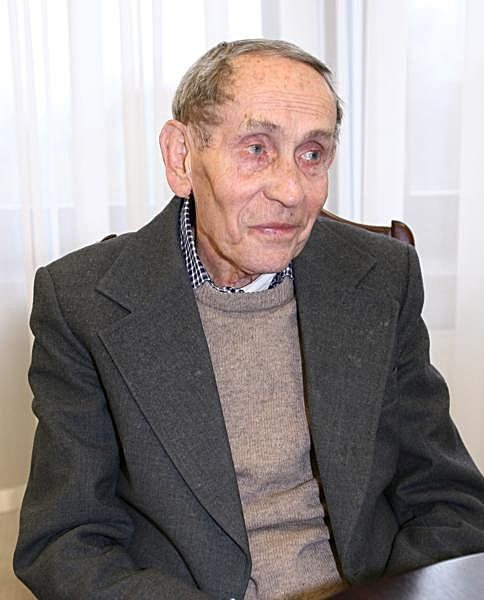
- Tadeusz Konwicki in 2008
- Born: 22 June 1926; Nowa Wilejka, Second Polish Republic (now Naujoji Vilnia, Lithuania)
- Died: 7 January 2015 (aged 88); Warsaw, Poland
- Education: Jagiellonian University
- Occupation: Writer
- Writing career
- Language: Polish

Tadeusz Konwicki (22 June 1926 – 7 January 2015) was a Polish writer and film director, as well as a member of the Polish Language Council.

== Life ==
Konwicki was born in 1926 as the only son of Jadwiga Kieżun and Michał Konwicki in Naujoji Vilnia, where he spent his early childhood. His father died early and Konwicki lived with his great-aunt and great-uncle who he later depicted in his novels. He attended a local Sigismund Augustus Gymnasium in Vilnius.

=== World War II ===
Immediately following the outbreak of World War II, Vilnius was occupied by the Soviet Union and subsequently by Nazi Germany, and all education for Poles was discontinued.

Konwicki continued his studies underground and joined the Home Army's 8th Oszmiana Brigade that took part in Operation Tempest and Operation Ostra Brama. He later disarmed and went into hiding from the Soviet Army. In November 1944, he joined Tur's (Witold Turonek) unit and fought until April 28, 1945 - one of the last guerrilla units in the area. After the war Vilnius was occupied by the Soviet Union and Konwicki was expatriated.

=== Cold War ===
In the spring of 1945 Konwicki moved to Kraków, where he enrolled at Jagiellonian University. He also started to work as a journalist at Odrodzenie weekly, moving to Warsaw in 1947 to continue his work for the magazine. In the capital, he was one of the leading advocates for Socialist Realism in literature. In 1948 he finished his memoirs of his partisan years (Rojsty), but the book was not published until 1956. His literary debut was the Produkcyjniak (production novel) Construction Site (1950, Przy budowie), which was followed by the novel Power (1954, Władza). His 1956 novel From a Besieged City (1956, Z oblężonego miasta) also became quite popular.

In the years 1952–1966 he was a member of Polish United Workers' Party. By the mid-1950s, Konwicki had become disillusioned by the communist regime in Poland and fell out of grace with the party. His later works (beginning with A Hole in the Sky (1959, Dziura w niebie), are mostly concerned with the author's childhood and the semi-mythical, romantic land of his youth.

At this time Konwicki became the head of the Kadr Film Studio and has since been recognized as one of the most notable members of the Polish Film School. However, his work veered away from the style pursued by his contemporaries, due to its uniquely bitter quality. As a filmmaker he is known for his Venice'58 Grand Prix winner The Last Day of Summer (Ostatni dzień lata, 1958), All Souls' Day (Zaduszki, 1961), as well as for his masterpieces Salto (1962) and How Far Away, How Near (Jak daleko stąd, jak blisko, 1973), as well as film adaptations: of Nobel Prize Winner Czesław Miłosz's book Issa Valley (Dolina Issy, 1982), and of Adam Mickiewicz's drama Forefather's Eve – Lava (1989).

He is widely known for two novels, published by the Polish underground press: The Polish Complex (1977) and A Minor Apocalypse (1979). The latter work, a bitter satire about a washed-up writer who is asked to burn himself in front of the Soviet-built Palace of Culture and Science, Warsaw; the novel was adapted as a 1993 French feature film, directed by Costa-Gavras. A Minor Apocalypse is a post-Orwellian parody that refers to specific historical events, such as self-immolation protests against the communist regime by Ryszard Siwiec in Poland and Jan Palach in Czechoslovakia.

In 1964 he received Kościelski Award.

== Literary works ==
- Tadeusz Konwicki (1970). A Dreambook for Our Time (Sennik współczesny). The MIT Press. ISBN 0-14-004115-X.
- Tadeusz Konwicki (1977). The anthropos-spectre-beast (Zwierzoczłekoupiór). Oxford University Press. ISBN 0-19-271407-4.
- Tadeusz Konwicki (1982). The Polish Complex (Kompleks polski). New York, Farrar Straus & Giroux. ISBN 1-56478-201-8.
- Tadeusz Konwicki (1983). A Minor Apocalypse (Mała apokalipsa). New York, Farrar Straus & Giroux. ISBN 1-56478-217-4.
- Tadeusz Konwicki (1987). Moonrise, Moonset (Wschody i zachody księżyca). New York, Farrar Straus & Giroux. ISBN 0-374-21241-4.
- Tadeusz Konwicki (1990). Bohin Manor (Bohiń). New York, Farrar Straus & Giroux. ISBN 0-374-11523-0.
- Tadeusz Konwicki (1991). New World Avenue and Vicinity (Nowy Świat i okolice). New York, Farrar Straus & Giroux. ISBN 0-374-22182-0.
- Tadeusz Konwicki (1994). The Calendar and the Hourglass (Kalendarz i klepsydra). Review of Contemporary Fiction. ISBN B00092VYV8.

== Films ==
=== Writer/Director ===
- The Last Day of Summer (Ostatni dzień lata, 1958)
- All Souls' Day (Zaduszki, 1961)
- Matura, short film, a segment of a French-German-Polish coproduction The Moment of Peace (Chwila pokoju / Le Moment de paix, 1965)
- Salto (1965)
- How Far Away, How Near (Jak daleko stąd, jak blisko, 1973)
- Issa Valley (Dolina Issy, 1982), based on a novel by Czesław Miłosz
- Lava (Lawa , 1989), based on a poetic drama by Adam Mickiewicz

=== Writer ===
- Career (Kariera, 1954, dir. Jan Koecher), co-written with Kazimierz Sumerski
- Winter Twilight (Zimowy zmierzch, 1956, dir. Stanisław Lenartowicz)
- Mother Joan of the Angels (Matka Joanna od Aniołów, 1961, dir. Jerzy Kawalerowicz), co-written with Kawalerowicz, based on a novella by Jarosław Iwaszkiewicz
- Pharaoh (Faraon, 1966, dir. Jerzy Kawalerowicz), co-written with Kawalerowicz, based on a novel by Bolesław Prus
- Jowita (1967, dir. Janusz Morgenstern), based on a novel by Stanisław Dygat
- Austeria (1982, dir. Jerzy Kawalerowicz), co-written with Kawalerowicz and Julian Stryjkowski, based on a novel by Stryjkowski
- A Chronicle of Amorous Accidents (Kronika wypadków miłosnych, 1985, dir. Andrzej Wajda), based on Konwicki's novel

== See also ==
- List of Poles
