= Marian Glinka =

Polish actor and bodybuilder

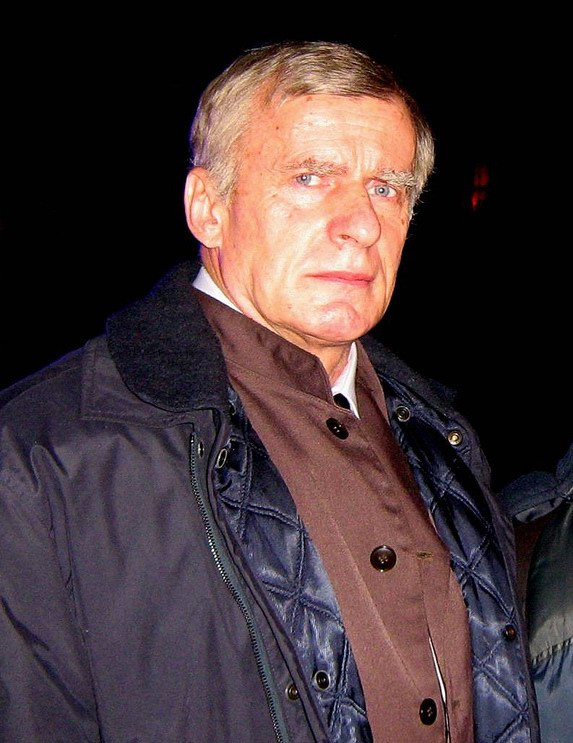
- Marian Glinka in August 2007
- Born: 1 June 1943; Warsaw
- Died: 23 June 2008 (aged 65); Warsaw

Marian Witold Glinka (1 June 1943 in Warsaw – 23 June 2008 in Warsaw) was a Polish actor and bodybuilder. He appeared in many Polish movies.

== Filmography ==
- Kochajmy syrenki (1967) – Clark in Boleslawiec (uncredited)
- Westerplatte (1967) – Private – 'Harbor' Outpost (uncredited)
- I Hate Mondays (1971) – Musician (uncredited)
- Czarne Chmury (1973) – człowiek margrabiego von Ansbach
- A Jungle Book of Regulations (1974) – Porter (uncredited)
- The Promised Land (1975) – Wilhelm Müller
- Zagrozenie (1976)
- Camouflage (1977) – Resort Manager
- Okrągły tydzień (1977) – Karols Kollege
- Spirala (1978) – Physician
- Hallo Szpicbródka, czyli ostatni występ króla kasiarzy (1978) – Actor
- Zerwane cumy (1979) – Seaman
- Boldyn (1982) – 'Grom'
- Czwartki ubogich (1981) – Kazio
- Filip z konopi (1983) – Andrzej's Friend (uncredited)
- Lata dwudzieste, lata trzydzieste (1984) – Boxer Grzes
- Milosc z listy przebojów (1985)
- Podróże pana Kleksa (1986) – Barnaba
- Tato, nie bój sie dentysty! (1986) – Father
- Rykowisko (1987) – Bodyguard
- Misja specjalna (1987) – Intelligence Officer Pretending Hans
- Republika nadziei (1988) – Bonawentura Spychalski
- Pan Kleks w kosmosie (1988)
- Swinka (1990) – Dolore's bodyguard (uncredited)
- Czarodziej z Harlemu (1990) – Kazik
- V.I.P. (1991) – Bunio
- Schindler's List (1993) – DEF SS Officer
- Dzieje mistrza Twardowskiego (1996) – Devil Barkalas
- Billboard (1998)
- Kilerów 2-óch (1999) – President's guard
- Quo Vadis (2001) – Casius
- The Hexer (2001) – Boholt
- Haker (2002) – Laura's father
- Jak to się robi z dziewczynami (2002) – Ada's Father
- Superprodukcja (2003) – Dziaslo
- Rys (2007) – Klemens
