= Oko proroka =

1984 film by Paweł Komorowski

Oko proroka (film) is a Polish historical film. It was released in 1984.
