= Blind Chance =

- Theatrical release poster
- Directed by: Krzysztof Kieślowski
- Written by: Krzysztof Kieślowski
- Produced by: Jacek Szelígowski
- Starring: Bogusław Linda
- Cinematography: Krzysztof Pakulski
- Edited by: Elżbieta Kurkowska
- Music by: Wojciech Kilar
- Distributed by: Przedsiebiorstwo Dystrybucji Filmów
- Release date: 10 January 1987; (finished in 1981)
- Running time: 122 minutes
- Country: Poland
- Language: Polish

Blind Chance (Polish: Przypadek) is a Polish film written and directed by Krzysztof Kieślowski and starring Bogusław Linda. The film presents three separate storylines, told in succession, about a man running after a train and how such an ordinary incident could influence the rest of the man's life. Originally completed in 1981, Blind Chance was suppressed by the Polish authorities for several years until its delayed release in Poland on 10 January 1987 in a censored form.

The film was screened in the Un Certain Regard section at the 1987 Cannes Film Festival. The film is among 21 digitally restored classic Polish films chosen for Martin Scorsese Presents: Masterpieces of Polish Cinema.

== Plot ==
Witek (Bogusław Linda), sitting on an airplane, for some reason screams "No!". A bleeding person is dragged across a hospital floor. As a child, Witek learns how to write. As an adolescent, Witek dates Czuszka. As an adult, Witek goes to medical school and dates Olga (Monika Gozdzik). Witek 'loses' his calling as a doctor after the death of his father. Witek decides to catch a train to Warsaw. There he crashes into a fellow drinking beer. Three different outcomes are shown, each depending on how Witek deals with the obstacles on his way to catching the train and whether or not he catches the train.

In the first scenario, Witek almost crashes into the fellow drinking the beer. He runs after the train at the Łódź Fabryczna railway station and is just barely able to jump aboard. On the train, he meets Werner (Tadeusz Łomnicki), an old Communist. Witek decides to join the Communist Party. On a walk with Werner, Witek bumps into with Czuszka (Bogusława Pawelec), his first love. The two meet up and have sex, after which a disappointed Czuszka discovers that Witek is applying to join the party. Witek unsuccessfully tries to solve a problem with an airline mechanic. Witek successfully defuses a hostage situation at a drug addiction clinic. As a reward, a party leader plans to send Witek on a special mission to Paris. Witek inadvertently tells his boss that Czuszka works with the underground, distributing banned literature. Czuszka is later arrested. After her release, Witek attempts to make up with Czuszka, but she rejects him. At Warsaw airport, Witek is informed that his mission to Paris has been cancelled.

In the second scenario, Witek slams into the fellow drinking the beer with such force that the mug slips from the drinker's hand and falls to the floor, breaking and spilling. Witek doesn't stop to apologize but still fails to catch the train. Instead he runs into a railway guard on the platform, knocks him to the ground, and runs off, fighting with police who are called in. Witek is arrested. A judge sentences Witek to thirty days and unpaid community service. Witek joins the anti-Communist resistance and meets up with Daniel, a friend from childhood, and his sister Wera. Witek converts to Catholicism and is baptised. Witek applies for a passport to go to France for a Catholic conference, but his request is denied because he is known to be an anti-Communist. The authorities offer him a passport, on the condition that he discloses the underground's contacts in France. Witek goes home and begins foreplay with Wera, but is called away to the resistance's lair. The place has been ransacked and the one person left there doubts Witek's loyalty.

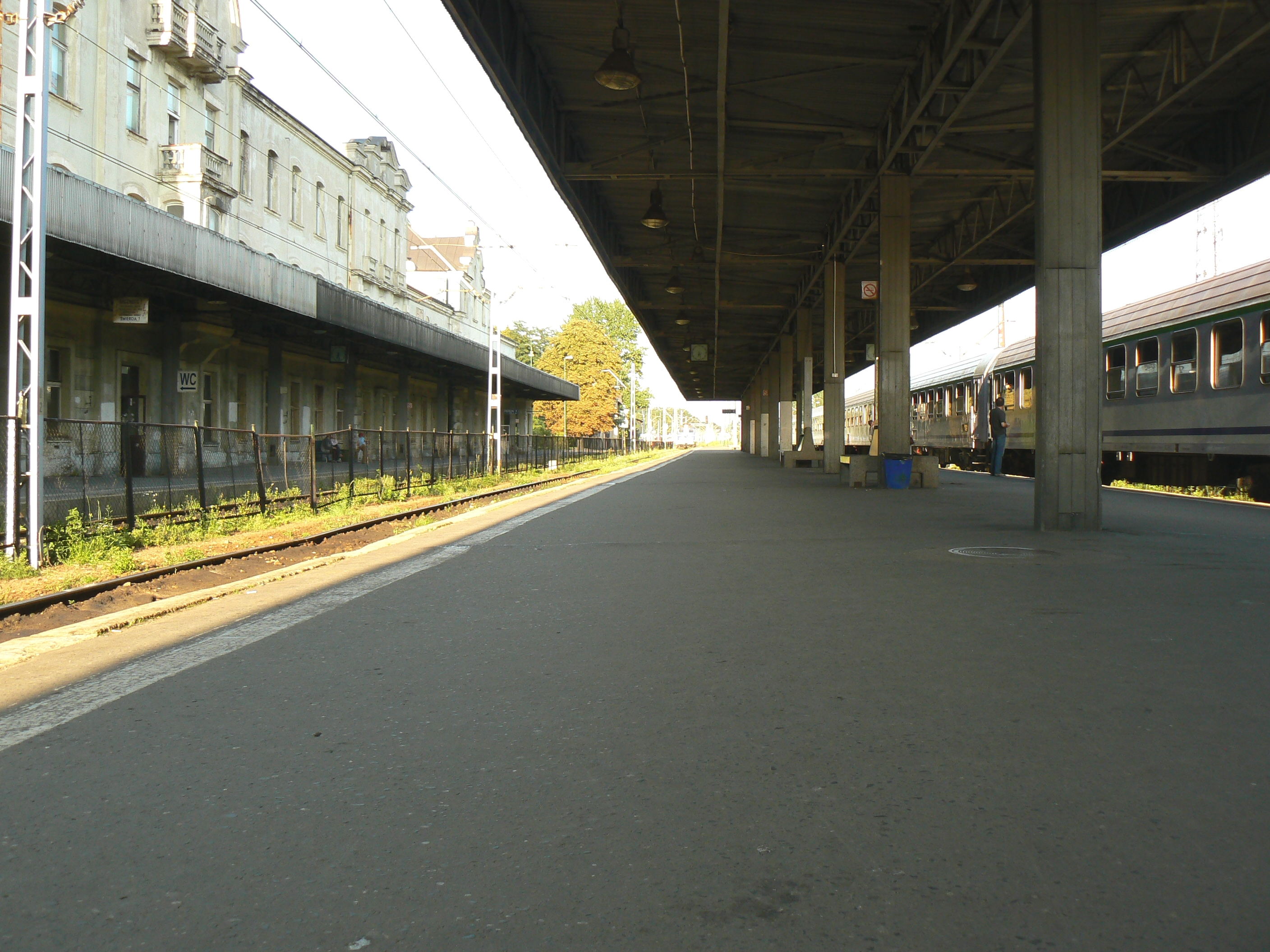
Łódź Fabryczna railway station, the turning point in the main character's life, as it appeared in 2011

In the third scenario, Witek almost crashes into the fellow drinking the beer but stops in time and goes around him, apologizing. He tries to catch the train, but fails. The railway guard shows up a few seconds later but now Witek has stopped to catch his breath. He notices Olga on the platform (it's not clear if she was there in the previous two scenarios). Witek and Olga go back to his apartment where they make love on the floor. Witek decides to resume his medical studies, graduates and starts practicing at the hospital, as well as teaching at the medical school. Olga tells him she is three months pregnant. The two get married. Witek refuses to join the Communist Party. At the medical school, some students pass around a petition on behalf of the dean's son, who is accused of hawking illegal literature. Witek refuses to sign the petition, noting that the dean himself hasn't signed either. Witek doesn't want to get involved in politics at all. When the dean's son is arrested, the dean knows he will lose his job as a result, and asks Witek to take his place on a trip to Libya to deliver a series of medical lectures. Witek accepts. Witek changes the airline ticket to a later date, to be home for his wife's birthday. His new flight goes through Paris. As Witek's train to Warsaw departs Łódź, Olga tells Witek she's pregnant with their second child, hoping it is a girl. At Warsaw airport, Witek sees some of the people who were more important in the previous two scenarios waiting to board the flight to Paris. As the plane taxis on the runway, Witek is comfortable in his seat. The plane takes off, but a few seconds later it explodes.

== Cast ==
- Bogusław Linda as Witek
- Tadeusz Łomnicki as Werner
- Zbigniew Zapasiewicz as Adam
- Boguslawa Pawelec as Czuszka
- Marzena Trybała as Werka
- Jacek Borkowski as Marek
- Jacek Sas-Uhrynowski as Daniel
- Adam Ferency as Ksiądz
- Monika Gozdzik as Olga
- Zygmunt Hubner as Dziekan
- Irena Byrska as Ciotka
- Jerzy Stuhr as ZSMP activist
- Jerzy Moes as SB officer

== Production ==
Filming locations

- Łódź Fabryczna Station, Łódź, Łódzkie, Poland
- Łódź, Łódzkie, Poland
- Rakowiecka, Mokotów, Warsaw, Mazowieckie, Poland
- Warsaw, Mazowieckie, Poland

== Critical response ==
As an example of Kieślowski's characters intersecting with history, Kickasola points out that Witek, who has the same birthdate (though not year) as Kieślowski (June 27, 1941), "ponders the irony of his 1956 birth date." In 1981, Kieślowski announced he planned to develop the realist convention as "deeper, not wider." With Blind Chance, Kieślowski "put his new philosophy partially into practice," but this film "still relies heavily on the political circumstances of Polish society to set the theme." Paul Coates describes this film "as marrying a near-psychoanalytic 'Western' preoccupation with the effects of the death of the father ... to a typically 'East European' reluctance to renounce humanism by invoking such psychoanalytic scenarios as the Oedipal one." On the review aggregator website Rotten Tomatoes, Blind Chance has an approval rating of 73% based on 11 reviews, with an average score of 7.00/10.

The filmmaker Agnieszka Holland highly praised the film in an interview for the Criterion Collection's home video release, said "Blind Chance is really one of Krzysztof's best films, perhaps even the best and the most original."

== Influences ==
In their interviews on the DVD (both region 1 and 2), Agnieszka Holland and film scholar Annette Insdorf identify Sliding Doors as a film influenced by Blind Chance. In both films, the outcome hinges on whether or not the protagonist catches a train, but in Sliding Doors, only two scenarios are presented (protagonist catches the train, doesn't catch it). Holland said "... a number of films just flat-out stole the concept... a mediocre film... called Sliding Doors... They took the concept and distorted it to where all the philosophical depth and stylistic subtlety disappeared."

Run Lola Run is similar to Blind Chance in that three scenarios are presented hinging on how the protagonist negotiates a mad dash through a crowded space. In Blind Chance the outcome of the life of the protagonist depends on how he handles the situation with the beer drinking fellow. In Run Lola Run, as Lola is leaving her apartment building, she has a confrontation with a young man and a dog. The result of this confrontation determines the outcome for her and her boyfriend. In Blind Chance, circumstances lead Witek to have a different character in each plot, echoed in Run Lola Run by the photographic montages shown of the people Lola passes along the way. First Witek is a communist, then a religious anticommunist, and finally he is apolitical.

== Awards ==
- 1987 Polish Film Festival Silver Lion Award: Krzysztof Kieślowski
- 1987 Polish Film Festival Best Actor Award: Bogusław Linda
