= The Promised Land (1975 film) =

- Polish promotional poster
- Directed by: Andrzej Wajda
- Written by: Andrzej Wajda
- Based on: The Promised Land by Władysław Reymont
- Starring: Daniel Olbrychski; Wojciech Pszoniak; Andrzej Seweryn
- Cinematography: Wacław Dybowski; Edward Kłosiński; Witold Sobociński
- Edited by: Zofia Dwornik; Halina Prugar
- Music by: Wojciech Kilar
- Release date: February 21, 1975
- Running time: 180 minutes
- Country: Poland
- Languages: Polish; German

The Promised Land (Polish: Ziemia obiecana) is a 1975 Polish drama film directed by Andrzej Wajda, based on the novel of the same name by Władysław Reymont. Set in the industrial city of Łódź, The Promised Land tells the story of a Pole, a German, and a Jew struggling to build a factory in the raw world of 19th-century capitalism.

Wajda presents a shocking image of the city, with its dirty and dangerous factories and ostentatiously opulent residences devoid of taste and culture. The film follows in the footsteps of Charles Dickens, Émile Zola and Maxim Gorky, as well as German expressionists such as Knopf, Meidner and Grosz, who gave testimony of social protest.

American filmmaker Martin Scorsese recognized the film as one of the masterpieces of Polish cinema and in 2013 he selected it for screening alongside films such as Ashes and Diamonds, Innocent Sorcerers, Knife in the Water and Man of Iron in the United States, Canada and United Kingdom as part of the Martin Scorsese Presents: Masterpieces of Polish Cinema festival of Polish films. In the 2015 poll conducted by the Polish Museum of Cinematography in Łódź, The Promised Land was ranked first on the list of the greatest Polish films of all time.

== Plot ==
Karol Borowiecki, a young Polish nobleman, is the managing engineer at the Bucholz textile factory. He is ruthless in his career pursuits, and unconcerned with the long tradition of his financially declined family. He plans to set up his own factory with the help of his friends Max Baum, a German and heir to an old handloom factory, and Moritz Welt, an independent Jewish businessman. Borowiecki's affair with Lucy Zucker, the wife of another textile magnate, gives him advance notice of a change in cotton tariffs and helps Welt to make a killing on the Hamburg futures market. However, more money has to be found so all three characters cast aside their pride to raise the necessary capital.

On the day of the factory opening, Borowiecki has to deny his affair with Zucker's wife to a jealous husband who, himself a Jew, makes him swear on a sacred Catholic object. Borowiecki then accompanies Lucy on her exile to Berlin. However, Zucker sends an associate to spy on his wife; he confirms the affair and informs Zucker, who takes his revenge on Borowiecki by burning down his brand new, uninsured factory. Borowiecki and his friends lose all that they had worked for.

The film fast forwards a few years. Borowiecki recovered financially by marrying Mada Müller, a rich heiress, and he owns his own factory. His factory is threatened by a workers' strike. Borowiecki is forced to decide whether or not to open fire on the striking and demonstrating workers, who throw a rock into the room where Borowiecki and others are gathered. He is reminded by an associate that it is never too late to change his ways. Borowiecki, who has never shown human compassion toward his subordinates, authorizes the police to open fire nevertheless.

== Selected cast ==
- Daniel Olbrychski as Karol Borowiecki
- Wojciech Pszoniak as Moritz Welt
- Andrzej Seweryn as Maks Baum
- Kalina Jędrusik as Lucy Zucker
- Anna Nehrebecka as Anka
- Bożena Dykiel as Mada Müller
- Andrzej Szalawski as Herman Bucholz
- Stanisław Igar as Grünspan
- Franciszek Pieczka as Mr Müller
- Kazimierz Opaliński as Maks' Father
- Andrzej Łapicki as Trawiński
- Wojciech Siemion as Wilczek
- Tadeusz Białoszczyński as Karol's Father
- Zbigniew Zapasiewicz as Kessler
- Jerzy Nowak as Zucker
- Piotr Fronczewski as Horn
- Jerzy Zelnik as Stein
- Maciej Góraj as Adam Malinowski
- Grażyna Michalska as Zośka Malinowska
- Włodzimierz Boruński as Halpern
- Danuta Wodyńska as Mrs Müllerowa
- Marian Glinka as Wilhelm Müller
- Jadwiga Andrzejewska Mrs Bucholz
- Aleksander Dzwonkowski as Zajączkowski
- Zdzisław Kuźniar as Kaczmarek
- Halina Gryglaszewska as Mrs Malinowska
- Jerzy Obłamski as Mr Malinowski

== Production ==
The orgy scene in the garden of Kessler's palace featured female textile workers as extras. And because it was cold, they were 'warmed up' with a little alcohol. "They were so into the atmosphere that they undressed more than they should have," recalled Andrzej Halinski, 2nd stage designer.

Initially during production, Wajda considered interspersing boards containing quotes from the Communist Manifesto to help the audience understand the film's themes. He commissioned Polish cartoonist Jan Lenica to prepare the artwork, but later decided that the boards weren't necessary.

Parts of the film were filmed at the Villa of "Cotton King" Karl Wilhelm Scheibler.

== Awards ==
At the 9th Moscow International Film Festival in 1975, the film won the Golden Prize. It was also nominated for the Academy Award for Best Foreign Language Film.

== See also ==
- Cinema of Poland
- List of Polish language films
- List of submissions to the 48th Academy Awards for Best Foreign Language Film
- List of Polish submissions for the Academy Award for Best Foreign Language Film

== Sources ==
- Niemitz, Dorota. 2014. The legacy of postwar Polish filmmaker Andrzej Munk. World Socialist Web Site. 13 October, 2014. https://www.wsws.org/en/articles/2014/10/13/munk-o13.html Retrieved 08 July, 2022.
