= Zbigniew Zapasiewicz =

Polish actor (1934–2009)

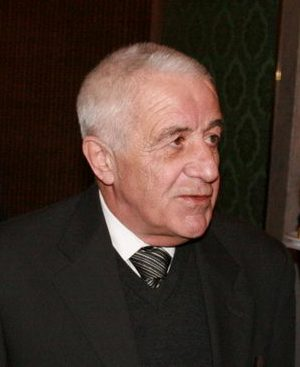
- Zapasiewicz in 2008
- Born: 13 September 1934; Warsaw, Poland
- Died: 14 July 2009 (aged 74); Warsaw, Poland
- Occupations: Actor, Director
- Years active: 1971–2009

Zbigniew Jan Zapasiewicz (13 September 1934 – 14 July 2009) was one of the most prominent post-war Polish actors, as well as a theatre director and pedagogue. In 2001, he received the Polish Academy Award for Best Actor.

== Biography ==
Zbigniew Zapasiewicz was born on 13 September 1934 in Warsaw, Poland. During 1951–1952 he studied chemistry at the Warsaw University of Technology. In 1956 he graduated in acting from the National Academy of Theatre in Warsaw (now Aleksander Zelwerowicz State Theatre Academy). He made his debut in 1955 in the Theatre of New Warsaw.

During 1959–1966 Zapasiewicz was an actor of the Contemporary Theatre. In 1982 he moved to Teatr Powszechny. During 1987–1990 he was a managing director of the Dramatic Theatre. Since 1993 he acted at the Contemporary Theatre.

Zapasiewicz died in Warsaw on 14 July 2009, at the age of 74.

== Filmography ==
Film credits
Year	Title	Role	Notes
1975	The Promised Land	Kessler	
1975	The Story of Sin	Priest Jutkiewicz	
1977	Camouflage	Jakub Szelestowski	
1978	Without Anesthesia	Jerzy Michalowski	
1979	The Maids of Wilko	Julcia's Husband	
1980	W biały dzień	“Siwy”	
1981	Blind Chance	1. Adam	
1984	A Year of the Quiet Sun	Szary	
1988	A Short Film About Killing	Committee Chairman	
1989	Túsztörténet	Alezredes	
1992	Pigs	Senator Wencel	
2000	Life as a Fatal Sexually Transmitted Disease	Tomasz Berg	
2005	Persona Non Grata	Wiktor Leszczyński	
2007	Hope	Franciszek's Father	
