= Lawa (film) =

1989 Polish film

'Lawa. Opowieść o 'Dziadach' Adama Mickiewicza
- Directed by: Tadeusz Konwicki
- Written by: Adam Mickiewicz (Forefathers' Eve); Tadeusz Konwicki
- Starring: Gustaw Holoubek
- Cinematography: Piotr Sobociński
- Release dates: 15 July 1989 (Moscow); 6 November 1989 (Poland)
- Running time: 129 minutes
- Country: Poland
- Language: Polish

Lawa. Opowieść o 'Dziadach' Adama Mickiewicza' (English: Lava. A Tale of Adam Mickiewicz's 'Forefathers' Eve) is a 1989 Polish drama film directed by Tadeusz Konwicki. It was entered into the 16th Moscow International Film Festival.

== Cast ==
- Gustaw Holoubek as Hermit / Ghost / Gustaw-Konrad / Poet
- Jolanta Piętek-Górecka as Maryla / Girl / Virgin / Angel / Woman
- Artur Zmijewski as Gustaw-Konrad
- Teresa Budzisz-Krzyżanowska as Mrs. Rollison
- Maja Komorowska as Sorcerer
- Grażyna Szapołowska as Guardian Angel
- Henryk Bista as Senator
- Piotr Fronczewski as Sobolewski
- Tadeusz Łomnicki as Priest / Writer
- Janusz Michałowski as Father Piotr
- Jan Nowicki as Ghost / Belzebub
- Arunas Smailys as Adolf (as Arunas Smajlis)
- Marzena Manteska as Maid / Angel
- Monika Jóźwik as Maid (as Monika Orłoś)
