= From a Far Country =

1981 film

- Directed by: Krzysztof Zanussi
- Screenplay by: Krzysztof Zanussi
- Story by: Diego Fabbri
- Starring: Cezary Morawski; Sam Neill; Christopher Cazenove
- Cinematography: Sławomir Idziak
- Edited by: Paolo Fabbri; Antony Gibbs; Waldemar Król
- Music by: Wojciech Kilar
- Release date: 1981

From a Far Country (Italian: Da un paese lontano, Polish: Z dalekiego kraju, also known as From a Far Country: Pope John Paul II) is a 1981 biographical drama film written and directed by Krzysztof Zanussi. A co-production between United Kingdom, Italy and Poland, it is loosely based on real life events of Karol Wojtyła, the future Pope John Paul II.

The film had a 5 million dollar budget. It premiered out of competition at the 38th edition of the Venice Film Festival.

== Cast ==
- Cezary Morawski as Karol Wojtyła
- Sam Neill as Marian
- Christopher Cazenove as Tadek
- Maja Komorowska as Dorota
- Lisa Harrow as Wanda
- John Welsh as Prete
- Maurice Denham as Sapieha
- Warren Clarke as Wladek
- Daniel Olbrychski as Captain
- Philip Latham as Chaplain
- Jerzy Stuhr as Engineer
