= Małgorzata Pritulak =

Polish theatre and film actress

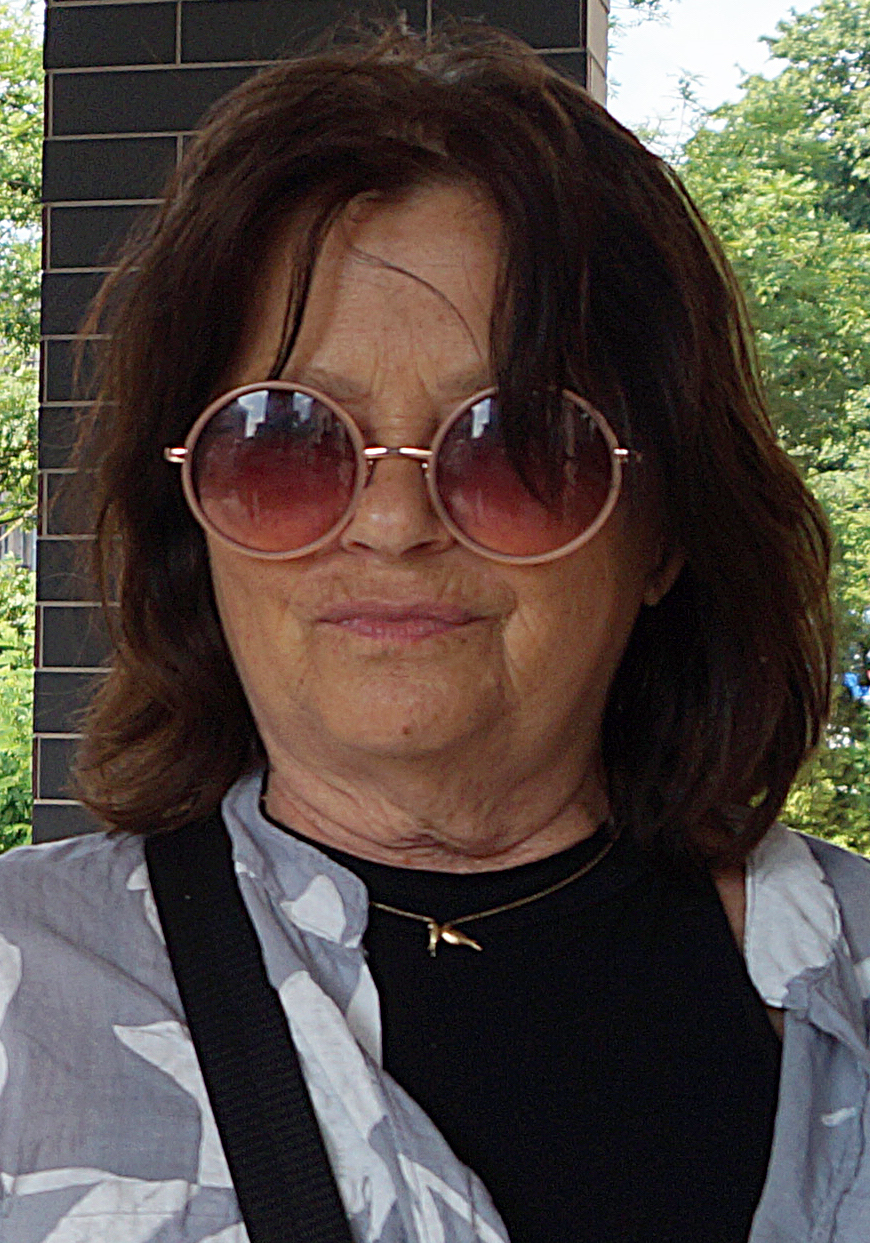
Małgorzata Pritulak

Małgorzata Pritulak (born 21 June 1947, Warsaw) is a Polish theatre and film actress.

In 1970, Pritulak graduated from the Theatre Academy in Warsaw.

She is the wife of actor Zdzisław Wardejn, and has two sons: Przemysław and Franciszek.

Pritulak won the Best Actress award at the then Polish Film Festival in 1974, for her performances in Mieczysław Waśkowski's Jej portret and Janusz Zaorski's Chleba naszego powszedniego.
