= The Constant Factor =

1980 film directed by Krzysztof Zanussi

- Directed by: Krzysztof Zanussi
- Written by: Krzysztof Zanussi
- Starring: Tadeusz Bradecki
- Cinematography: Sławomir Idziak
- Music by: Wojciech Kilar
- Distributed by: New Yorker Films (US)
- Release dates: May 1980 (premiere at Cannes); 9 March 1983 (US, limited)
- Running time: 92 min.
- Country: Poland
- Language: Polish

The Constant Factor (Polish: Constans) is a 1980 Polish film directed by Krzysztof Zanussi. It tells the story of a young man struggling to face the death of his mother and harbouring a desire to climb the Himalayas as his father had done.

The film won the Jury Prize and the Prize of the Ecumenical Jury at the 1980 Cannes Film Festival.

== Plot ==
Witold, a graduate of a school for electricians, participates in high-mountain climbing during his military service. One of the mountaineers at the shelter mentions Witold's father, who died during a mountain expedition. Thanks to the business card he received from this mountaineer, Witold, after completing his military service, obtains a job in an exhibition company. Thanks to this, he often works abroad. While doing so, he notices that his boss, Mariusz, is issuing fraudulent visas.

His mother becomes suddenly ill and Witold goes to a provincial town to visit her. In the hospital, he finds her on a bed in the corridor due to the lack of space. He intervenes unsuccessfully and nurse Grażyna tells him that a bribe should have been paid. His terminally ill mother returns home and then dies. Unable to shake off his mother's death, Witold, in an act of defiance, rebels against Mariusz when the latter, on his next business trip, invites him to take part in various minor frauds. For this, he is harassed by his colleagues, who are complicit with his boss. As Witold, together with his military colleague Stefan, is preparing for a planned trip to the Himalayas, his colleagues frame him, and at the customs clearance an undeclared amount of two hundred dollars was found on him.

Witold loses his job, and the only person who stays close to him is Grażyna. Witold then earns his living as a window cleaner for skyscrapers and erecting scaffolding during the renovation of monuments. As an unregistered student, he attends lectures on mathematics at the Polytechnic. Although the professor encourages Witold to undertake regular studies, he is sceptical about the proposal. When one day he is working on scaffolding for a crumbling facade, a small child chasing a ball is hit with falling debris. The film ends with a scream from Witold.

== Cast ==
- Tadeusz Bradecki – Witold
- Zofia Mrozowska – Witold's Mother
- Malgorzata Zajaczkowska – Grazyna
- Cezary Morawski – Stefan
- Witold Pyrkosz – Mariusz
- Ewa Lejczak – Stefan's Wife
- Jan Jurewicz – Zenek
- Juliusz Machulski – Wladek
- Marek Litewka – Wlodzimierz
- Jacek Strzemzalski – Mate
- Edward Zebrowski – Scientist
