= Camouflage (1977 film) =

1977 Polish film

- Directed by: Krzysztof Zanussi
- Written by: Krzysztof Zanussi
- Starring: Piotr Garlicki
- Cinematography: Edward Kłosiński
- Music by: Wojciech Kilar
- Release date: 28 January 1977
- Running time: 106 minutes
- Country: Poland
- Language: Polish

Camouflage (Polish: Barwy ochronne) is a 1977 Polish drama film directed by Krzysztof Zanussi. The film was selected as the Polish entry for the Best Foreign Language Film at the 50th Academy Awards, but was not accepted for nomination.

== Plot ==
Students are staying at a summer linguistics study camp. One of the directors, Jarosław, is young and prefers a direct, informal approach. He is opposed by the manipulative Jakub. For example, Jarosław allows a dissident student to participate. While the jury prize is given to a mediocre paper, the unconventional school of thought still receives a commendation. When the Deputy Rector arrives for the closing ceremonies, and since he rejects unorthodox viewpoints, tensions rise. They climax when the student bites the rector's ear. The police are called in.

== Cast ==
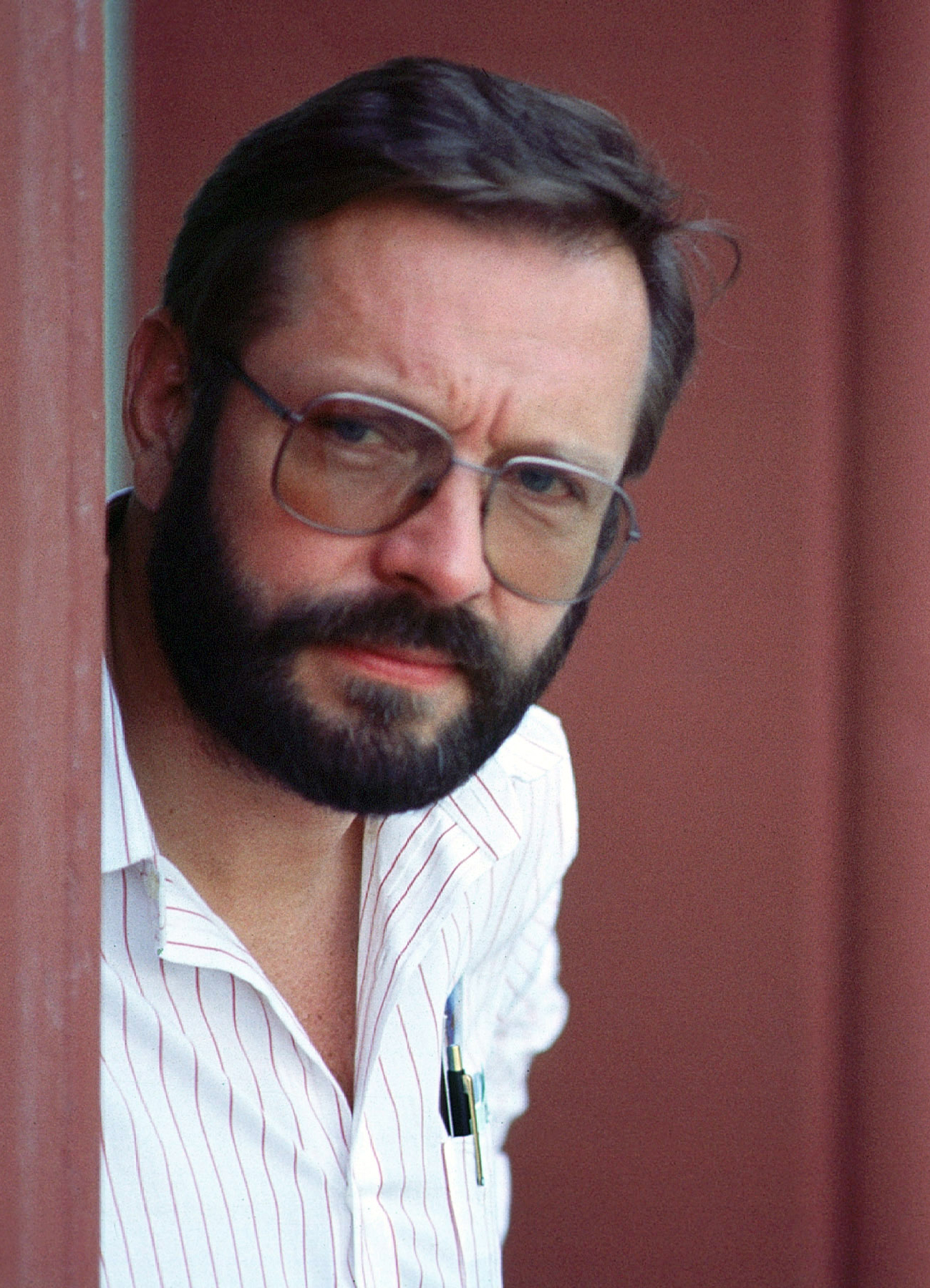
Director of the film Krzysztof Zanussi (1984)

- Piotr Garlicki as Jarosław Kruszyński
- Zbigniew Zapasiewicz as Jakub Szelestowski
- Christine Paul-Podlasky as Nelly Livington-Pawluk
- Mariusz Dmochowski as Vice Dean
- Wojciech Alaborski as Kiszewski
- Mieczysław Banasik as Józef
- Krystyna Bigelmajer as Zofia
- Jadwiga Colonna-Walewska as Deanery Manager
- Alfred Freudenheim as Official
- Marian Glinka as Resort Manager
- Hanna Grzeszczak as Girl in Kitchen
- Iwona Słoczyńska as Ania
- Riccardo Salvino as Italian

== Reception ==
Janet Maslin described the film as "languid and gentle" and, like others by Zanussi, both "provocative" and "puzzling". Maslin's review suggests that the film is compelling and carefully constructed, but ultimately ends up more ambiguous than satisfying. For example, "The relationship between Jakub and Jaroslaw seems so complex and fascinating that its obscure side becomes a palpable disappointment. Their intimacy, which has both seductive and diabolical touches, seems destined to change both men... "Camouflage" never quite settles these matters, not even when time has run out - and it needs to."

== See also ==
- List of submissions to the 50th Academy Awards for Best Foreign Language Film
- List of Polish submissions for the Academy Award for Best Foreign Language Film
