= Krzysztof Zanussi =

Polish producer and film director (born 1939)

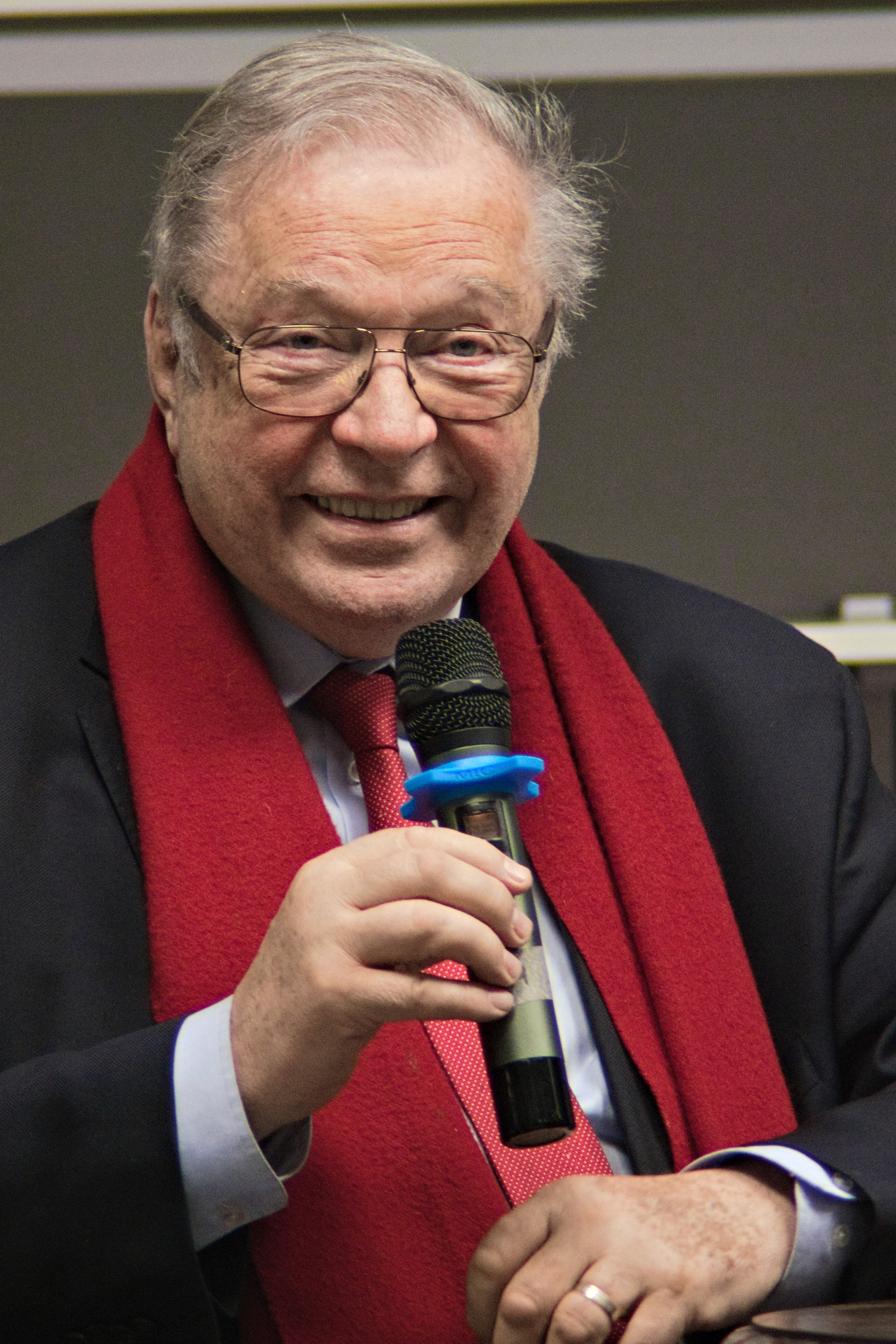
- Krzysztof Zanussi in 2020
- Born: 17 June 1939 (age 87); Warsaw, Poland
- Education: National Film School in Łódź
- Occupations: Film director; producer; professor

Krzysztof Pius Zanussi (born 17 June 1939) is a Polish film and theatre director, producer and screenwriter. He is a professor of European film at the European Graduate School in Saas-Fee, Switzerland where he conducts a summer workshop. He is also a professor at the Krzysztof Kieślowski Film School of the University of Silesia in Katowice.

He is the recipient of the Golden Lion at the 1984 Venice Film Festival for A Year of the Quiet Sun, the Jury Prize at the 1980 Cannes Film Festival for The Constant Factor as well as two Grands Prix at the 1977 and 2000 Gdynia Film Festival for Camouflage and Life as a Fatal Sexually Transmitted Disease, respectively.

== Biography ==
Zanussi was born in 1939 in Warsaw as an only child of Jerzy Zanussi and Wanda (née Niewiadomska). His father was of Italian ancestry and worked as a structural engineer.

Zanussi studied physics at Warsaw University (Uniwersytet Warszawski) and philosophy at the Jagiellonian University (Uniwersytet Jagielloński) in Kraków. He is a graduate of the prestigious National Film School in Łódź (1967).

He is a director of the Polish Film Studio TOR and has received several prizes and awards, including the David di Donatello Prize of the Accademia del Cinema Italiano, the Cavalier's Cross of the Polonia Restituta Order, and the Cavalier de L'Ordre des Sciences et Lettres.

Krzysztof Zanussi has written On editing an amateur film (1968), Discourse on an amateur film (1978) and a book of memoirs The Time to Die (1997). He appeared as himself in Camera Buff (1979), a film about an amateur film maker, directed by his friend Krzysztof Kieślowski. His film The Constant Factor (1980) (Polish: Constans) received the Jury Prize at the 1980 Cannes Film Festival. During the 1980s, he spent much of his time in the West.

Among the films that he made during this time was a film entitled From a Far Country: Pope John Paul II (1981) about the life of Karol Wojtyła in the context of the complicated history of modern Poland. His 1989 film Inventory was entered into the 16th Moscow International Film Festival. His 2000 film Life as a Fatal Sexually Transmitted Disease won the Golden St. George at the 22nd Moscow International Film Festival.

His 2002 film The Supplement was entered into the 24th Moscow International Film Festival where it won the FIPRESCI Special Mention.

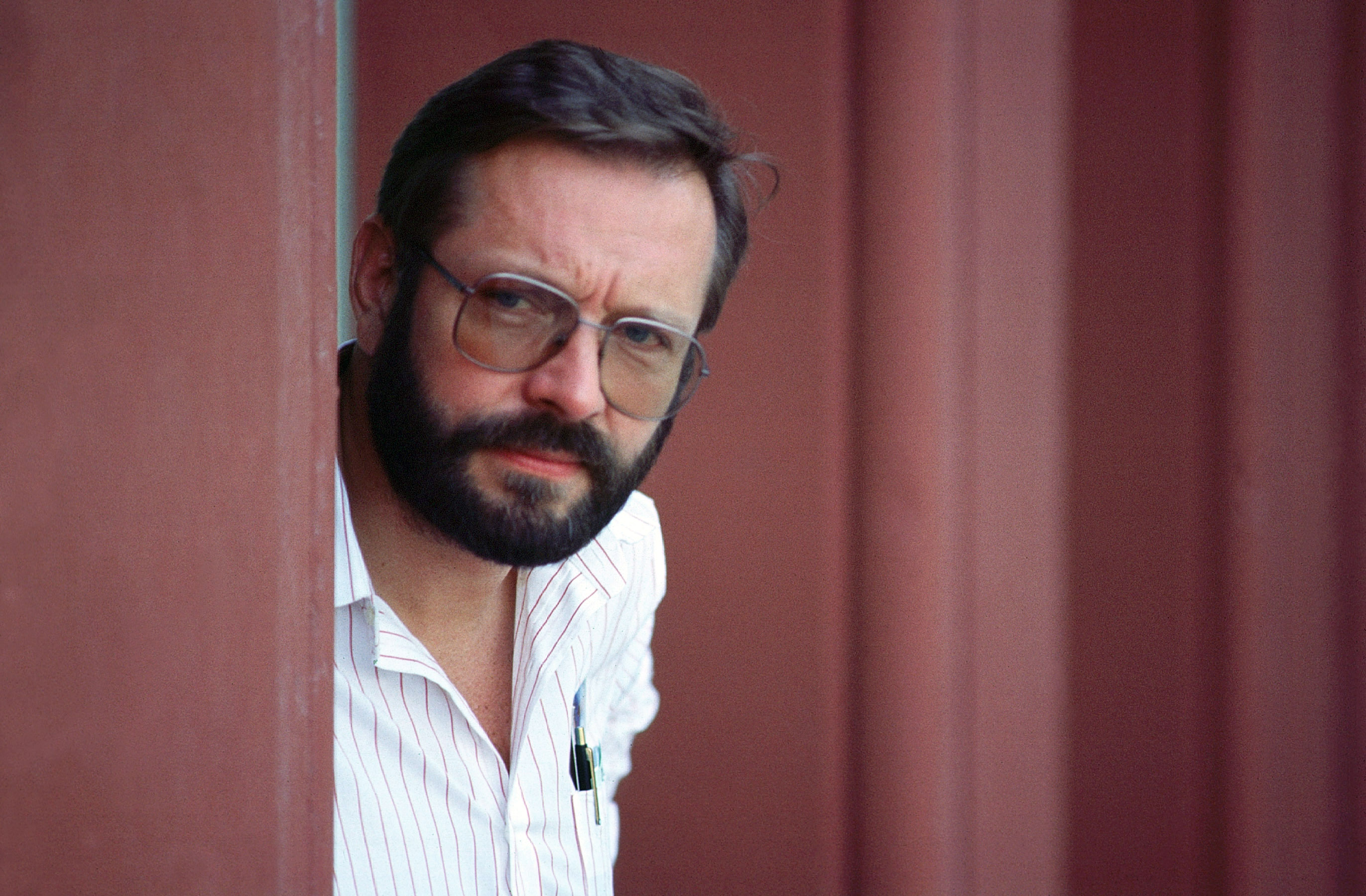
Zanussi in 1984

Zanussi has described his 1996 film, At Full Gallop, as his most autobiographical work. It follows the director through several years of his boyhood in Poland under post-World War II Communism. Zanussi served at the head of TOR Film Studio in the eighties. When asked about his experience as a producer he said, "Despite the work of the censors the zespół [state-owned film company] system assured a partial autonomy to our cineastes during the Communist era".

According to the records of Institute of National Remembrance since 1962 to 1964 Zanussi was registered without his consent as a secret collaborator of communist Służba Bezpieczeństwa codename "Aktor". He had several conversations with Communist secret service officers, however he never began to act as a secret collaborator. Zanussi talks openly about his contacts with Służba Bezpieczeństwa but denies any wrongdoing.

He was awarded the Lifetime Achievement award on 20 November 2012 at the 43rd International Film Festival of India held in Goa.

At the end of the 1980s, he co-founded the European Film Academy with Ingmar Bergman which convoked him in the first nucleus of one hundred members. Subsequently, Zanussi left the academy not agreeing with its development as an elitarian club. By the end of the 2000s, Zanussi took part again with the activities and the expansion of the community to around 1.000 members. He remarked the potential leading role of the academy for the European intercultural cinematographic productions, especially for those realized in non-English languages on the model of the successful experiences of the 1960s. He is the honorary president of Italian People and Religions – Terni Film Festival and he promoted the constitution of a web inter-religious European festivals consisting of Terni Film Festival in Italy, Sacrofilm festival of Zamość in Poland and Journées Cinema et Réconciliation of Notre Dame de La Salette in France.

== Selected filmography ==
- The Structure of Crystal (Struktura kryształu, 1969)
- Family Life (Życie rodzinne, 1971)
- Behind the Wall (Za ścianą, 1971, TV film)
- The Illumination (Iluminacja, 1973)
- The Catamount Killing (Lohngelder für Pittsville, 1974)
- A Woman's Decision (Bilans kwartalny, 1975)
- Camouflage (Barwy ochronne, 1977)
- Haus der Frauen (1977, TV film)
- Spiral (1978)
- Ways in the Night (1979)
- The Constant Factor (1980)
- Kontrakt (1980, TV film)
- From a Far Country (1981)
- The Temptation (1981, TV film)
- The Unapproachable (1982, TV film)
- Imperative (1982)
- Bluebeard (1984, TV film)
- A Year of the Quiet Sun (1984)
- Power of Evil (1985)
- Erloschene Zeiten (1987, TV film)
- The Young Magician (1987)
- Wherever You Are... (1988)
- Inventory (1989)
- Napoléon et l'Europe (1991, TV series)
- Life for Life: Maximilian Kolbe (1991)
- Long Conversation with a Bird (1992, TV film)
- The Silent Touch (1992)
- Weekend Stories (1996)
- At Full Gallop (1996)
- Our God's Brother (1997)
- Life as a Fatal Sexually Transmitted Disease (2000)
- The Supplement (2001)
- Persona non grata (2005)
- Black Sun (2007)
- And a Warm Heart (2008)
- Jacquinot: A Forgotten Hero (2009)
- Revisited (2009)
- Interior voices (2009)
- Foreign Body (2015)
- Eter (2018)

== See also ==
- List of Poles
- Cinema of Poland
- Cinema of moral anxiety
