= Barbara Ptak =

Polish costume designer (1930–2025)

- Born: Barbara Boruszak; April 6, 1930; Chorzow, Poland
- Died: November 5, 2025 (aged 95)
- Occupation: Costume designer

Barbara Ptak (6 April 1930 – 5 November 2025) was a Polish costume designer.

== Biography ==
Ptak was born Barbara Boruszak in Chorzów, on 6 April 1930. In 1963, she graduated from the Faculty of Graphic Arts of the Academy of Fine Arts in Warsaw in the studio of Prof. Józef Mroszczak. She prepared her theoretical diploma thesis along with the design of the exhibition on the occasion of the 75th anniversary of cinema in Poland under the supervision of Prof. Jerzy Teoplitz.

In 1960, while still a student, she began cooperating as a costume designer in the production of Jack of Spades, directed by Tadeusz Chmielewski. Throughout her career, she designed for a number of productions, including Pharaoh (1966), Pearl in the Crown (1972) and The Promised Land (1975).

Ptak died on 5 November 2025, at the age of 95.

== Selected filmography ==
- 1961: Milczące ślady (dir. Zbigniew Kuźmiński)
- 1962: Nóż w wodzie (dir. Roman Polański)
- 1962: Drugi brzeg (dir. Zbigniew Kuźmiński)
- 1964: Pieciu (dir. Paweł Komorowski)
- 1966: Pharaoh (dir. Jerzy Kawalerowicz)
- 1966: Sublokator (dir. Janusz Majewski)
- 1972: Perła w koronie (dir. Kazimierz Kutz)
- 1975: Ziemia obiecana (dir. Andrzej Wajda)
- 1975: Noce i dnie (dir. Jerzy Antczak)
- 1977: Dagny (dir. Haakon Sandøy)
- 1983: Epitafium dla Barbary Radziwiłłówny (dir. Janusz Majewski)
- 1987: Wierna Rzeka (dir. Tadeusz Chmielewski)

== Awards ==
In 2004, she was awarded the Cross of Merit. In 2008, she was awarded the Gloria Artis Medal for Merit to Culture.
