= Anna Maria Hinel =

- Born: Anna Maria Hinel; 31 January 1924; Warsaw, Poland
- Died: 19 March 1943 (aged 19); Auschwitz-Birkenau, German-occupied Poland
- Resting place: Auschwitz concentration camp
- Occupations: Diarist, girl scout
- Writing career
- Language: Polish

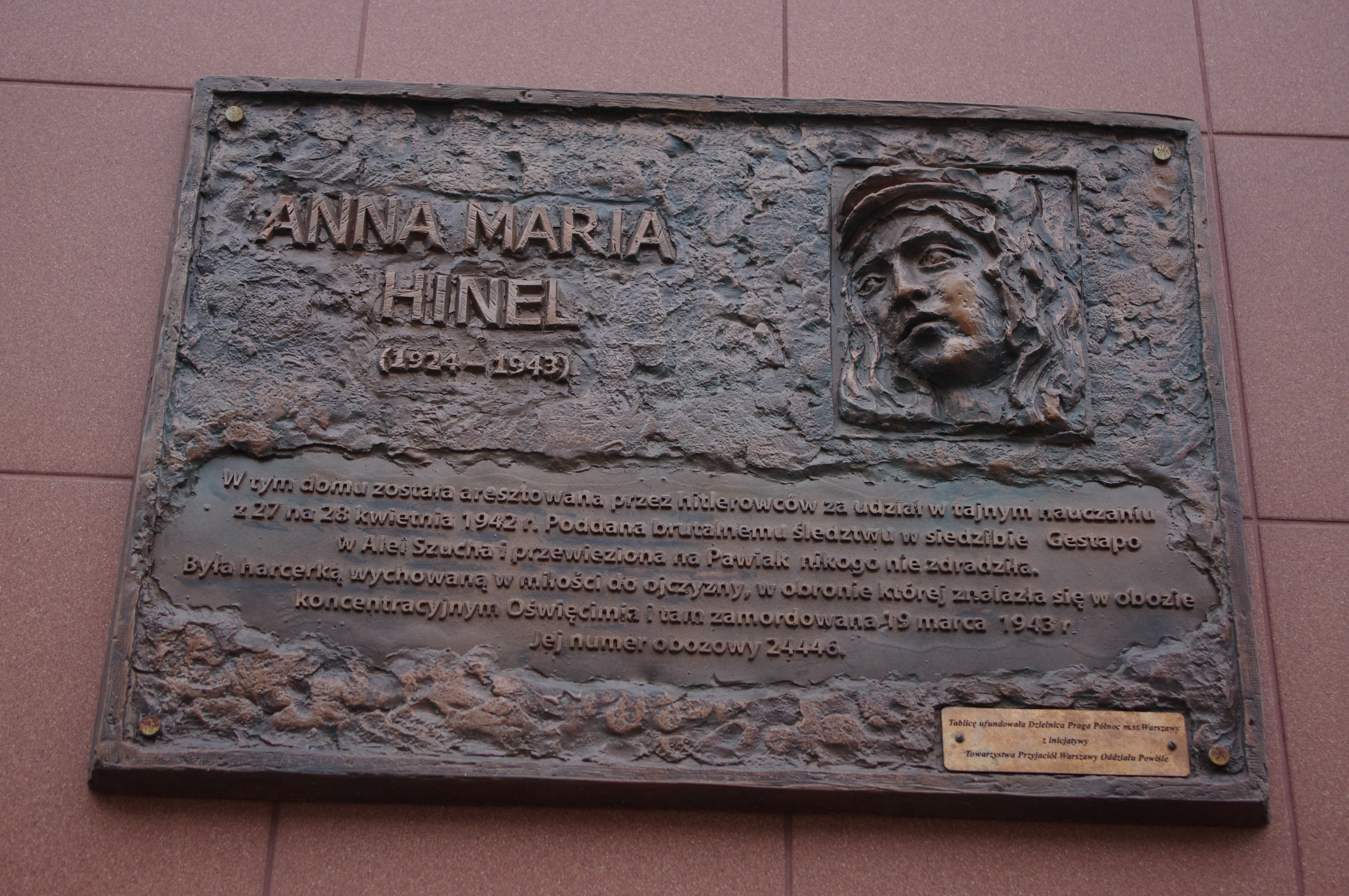
Plaque commemorating Anna Maria Hinel on the building at Florianska Street 8, in Warsaw in Poland

Anna Maria Hinel (Polish pronunciation: [anna maria xinɛl]; born 31 January 1924 in Warsaw, died on March 19, 1943, in Auschwitz-Birkenau) was a Polish girl scout, activist of the underground independence movement during World War II, and author of a diary from the German Nazi occupation.

== Early life ==
Anna Maria Hinel was born on January 31, 1924, in Warsaw, in Poland. She was the only child of Jadwiga and Wawrzyniec Hinel. Anna Maria Hinel was a student at the Queen Jadwiga Junior High School in Warsaw, in Poland. She graduated from the third grade until the outbreak of the World War II. During the war, she continued her education as part of secret teaching in German-occupied Poland by teachers from her former school. Together with her teachers and schoolmates, she was active in the Department of Conspiracy Communications Union of Armed Struggle - Home Army (ZWZ-AK).

== Arrest ==
As a result of a German Nazi investigation, she was arrested along with her friends and two teachers. On the night of April 28–29, 1942, she was arrested, in her apartment at Florianska Street, in Warsaw.

== Deportation and death ==
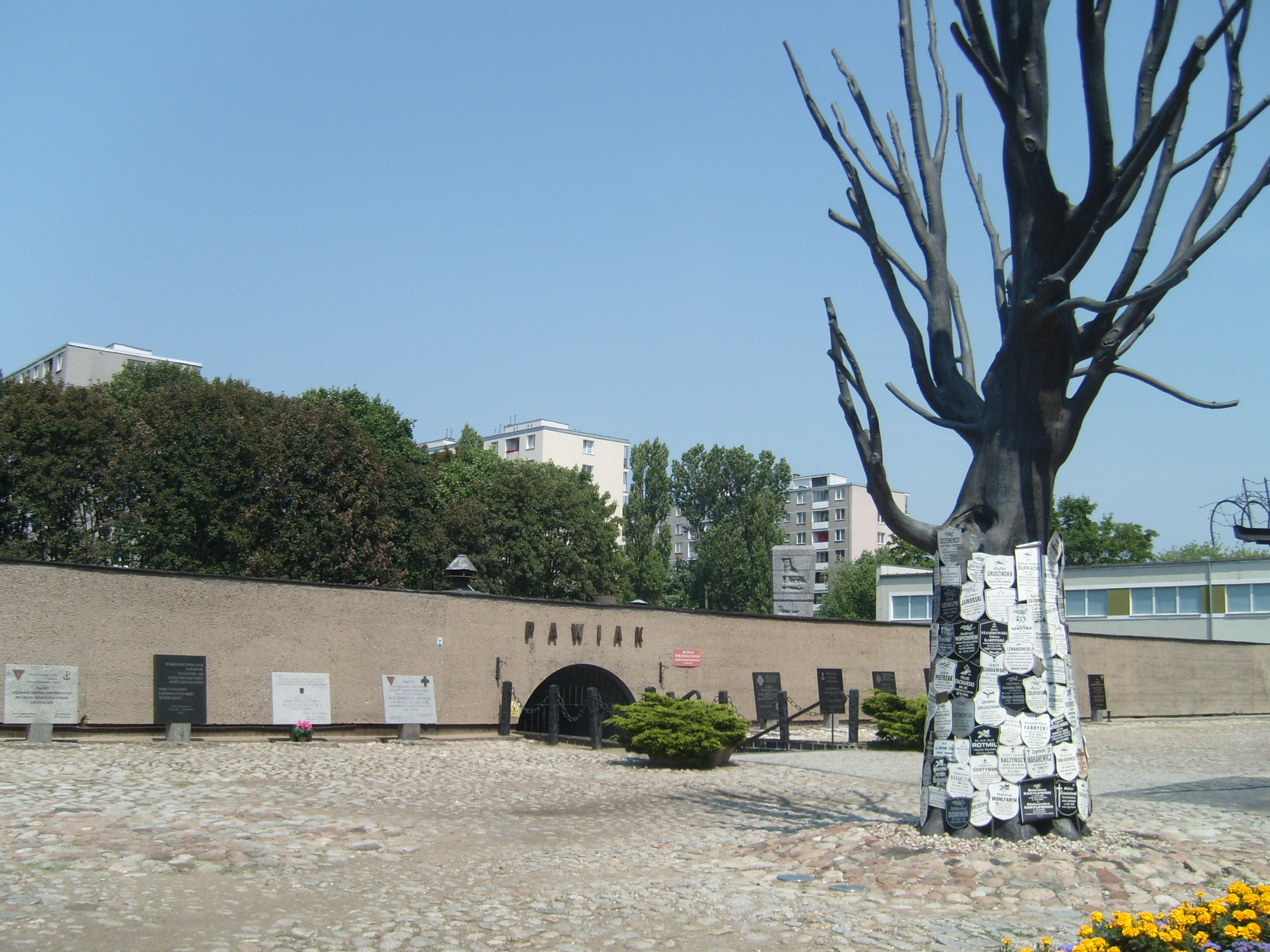
Anna Maria Hinel was imprisoned in the German Nazi Pawiak prison in Warsaw. Monument as a Tree in Pawiak prison

She was arrested and imprisoned in German Nazi Pawiak prison in the women's ward called "Serbia Prison in Warsaw". She was investigated at the Gestapo headquarters in Aleja Szucha in Warsaw. For several months, the whole group was subjected to brutal interrogations. Anna Maria Hinel did not say anything to the occupiers, she did not betray anyone, just like her friends. Her both teachers were killed in the Pawiak prison. On November 13, 1942, she was deported with her friends to the German Nazi concentration camp Auschwitz-Birkenau. Anna Maria Hinel received the number 24447 in Auschwitz camp. She wrote her last letter to her parents from block 23 of the Auschwitz-Birkenau camp. She died on March 19, 1943, in Auschwitz concentration camp. She was 19 years old at the time

== The Diary of Anna Maria Hinel ==
The father of Anna Maria Hinel, many years after the death of his daughter, found under the floor in an apartment on Florianska Street - her diary written from September 30, 1939, to August 5, 1940. From March 2013, the "Diary of Anna Maria Hinel" is in the collections of the Auschwitz-Birkenau State Museum

== In culture ==
Stanisław Majewski, based on the diary of Anna Maria Hinel, wrote a book titled "Anna Maria". Published in it are reproduced and read diary cards. Based on the "Diary of Anna Maria Hinel", director Ludmiła Niedbalska made a film in 1981 entitled "Schoolgirl". The film starred among others: Ewa Serwa, Barbara Rachwalska, Teresa Lipowska, Jerzy Kryszak, Tomasz Zaliwski, Jacek Borkowski, Wieńczysław Gliński, Jacek Kałucki and Tomasz Stockinger

== Commemoration ==
In the building where Anna Maria Hinel lived and was arrested and where her diary was found at Floriańska Street number 8, in Warsaw, there is a plaque dedicated to her.

== See also ==
- Anne Frank
- Rutka Laskier
- List of diarists
- List of Poles
- Nazi crimes against the Polish nation
- Wola massacre
- List of Poles
- Wawer massacre
