= Jan Byrczek =

Polish musician (1936–2019)

- Born: 15 June 1936; Chelmek, Poland
- Died: 10 November 2019 (aged 83)63073
- Genre: Jazz
- Occupations: Jazz musician Jazz critic Musicologist; Impresario; Magazine editor Pioneer of jazz organizations Banking executive Emerging market entrepreneur
- Instrument: Bass
- Years active: 1955–2019
- Label: Muza

Jan A. Byrczek (15 June 1936 – 10 November 2019) was a jazz musician (double bass), jazz critic, and jazz magazine editor. He was born in Chelmek, and until the age of 41, worked as a musician in Poland, performing with artists that include the Trio Komeda Quartet Kurylewicz. Due to illness, Byrczek stopped playing. He then managed the Kraków Jazz Club and Polish Jazz Federation. He was a co-founder of the European Jazz Federation in 1956 and founded Jazz Forum in 1964. In 1977, he moved to the United States and was granted citizenship in 1987.

== Selected discography ==
- Andrzej Trzaskowski Trio, Concert in Warsaw, Muza Records L0291

Recorded 8 June 1959
Andrzej Trzaskowski (piano), Jan Byrczek (bass), pl:Jan Zylber (drums)

1. "Metamorphosis"
- Somnabulists, Andrzej Kurylewicz Trio with Wanda Warska, Muza Records L0348 OCLC 793458658

Recorded in Warsaw, 23 February 1961
Wanda Warska (vocal), Andrzej Kurylewicz (piano), Jan Byrczek (bass), Andrzej Dąbrowski (drums)

1. "Moonray"
2. "Somnambulicy"
3. "Stompin' at the Savoy"
4. "Lover Man"

Recorded in Warsaw, 24 February 1961
Add Roman Kurylewicz (trumpet), Wojciech Karolak replaces Andrzej Kurylewicz (piano)

5. "You'd Be So Nice To Come Home To"
6. "But Not For Me"
7. "Ballada o straconej gazy"
8. "Tubby"
- Zbigniew Namyslowski Sextet, Muza Records N0286

Recorded in Warsaw, 9 December 1963
Zbigniew Namyslowski (alto sax), Michal Urbaniak (tenor sax), Wlodzimierz Gulgowski (piano), Jan Byrczek (bass), Czeslaw Bartkowski (drums), Brigitte Petry (vocal)

1. "What you gonna do"
2. "I'll try to sing the blues"
3. "Blues for me"
4. "O what a wonderful feeling"
- Zbigniew Namyslowski Quintet, Muza Records N0307

Recorded in Warsaw, 4 April 1964
Piotr Pulawski (guitar), added, pl:Marek Tarnowski (vocal), replaces Brigitte Petry

1. "Powiedz jej tak"
2. "Tramwaj 24"
3. "Lubie deszcz"
4. "Gee baby, ain't I good to you?"

== Selected publications ==
- Jazzman's reference Book, by Jan Byrczek, Vienna: International Jazz Federation, Inc.

Volume 1 (1974) OCLC 162863196
Volume 2 (1976) OCLC 2831760, 640332255
Volume 3 (1979) OCLC 6953300, 164944240, 162863208 OCLC 640332256
Volume 4 (1982) OCLC 159887095
Volume 5 (1983) OCLC 11110210
Volume 6 (1998) OCLC 38436461

== Affiliations ==
- Byrczek founded the Polish Jazz Society in 1963 and served as its president until 1973. During his tenure, the Society grew into the largest jazz organization of Europe with branch offices in various parts of Poland.
- Byrczek co-founded the first non-governmental Concert Bureau Agency in 1965 under the auspices of the Polish Jazz Society. The Agency organized and produced thousands of concerts in Poland, East Europe, and what then was the Soviet Union. From 1963 to 1972, he developed the Jazz Jamboree Festival in Warsaw into a world-renowned annual event.
- Byrczek founded Jazz Forum (magazine) in 1963 and served as its editor-in-chief until 1981.
- Byrczek initiated the European Jazz Federation in 1965, later renamed the International Jazz Federation, and served as its Secretary General in Vienna, Austria, headquarters from 1972 until 1981. Upon moving to New York City in 1977, he founded the U.S. branch of IJF that same year.
- From 1972 till 1985, Byrczek was the publisher of various jazz magazines (including Jazz World) and directories. In 1985 he established and still manages the American Music Database and Jazz World Database.
- In 1987. Byrczek initiated the Polish American Resources Corporation (PARC), which, in 1989, created the first private bank with foreign capital in Poland: The American Bank in Poland (AmerBank). Serving as the Deputy Chairman of Board of Directors, and residing in Warsaw in 1990 and 1991. Byrczek was instrumental in the development of the bank. In 1992, after fulfilling his contract with Bankers Trust to run the AmerBank, Byrczek returned to USA and is developing computer and internet related database publishing business and other US-Poland ventures.

== Growing up ==
From 1952 to 1961, Byrczek studied music at Fryderyk Chopin High School and the Academy of Music in Kraków. From 1955 to 1963, he was a jazz bassist with bands that toured extensively throughout Poland and Europe.

== Audio and visual ==
- Byrczek interview on YouTube
