= Sublokator =

1966 Polish comedy film

- Directed by: Janusz Majewski
- Written by: Janusz Majewski
- Starring: Jan Machulski; Barbara Ludwiżanka; Katarzyna Łaniewska; Magdalena Zawadzka
- Cinematography: Kurt Weber
- Edited by: Janina Niedźwiecka
- Music by: Andrzej Kurylewicz
- Production company: Kamera Film Production Team
- Distributed by: Film Distribution Center
- Release dates: October 1966 (International Filmfestival Mannheim-Heidelberg); January 7, 1967 (Poland)
- Running time: 90 minutes
- Country: Poland
- Language: Polish

Sublokator (The Subtenant) is a Polish comedy film from 1966 directed by Janusz Majewski, based on his own screenplay. The film tells the story of the titular subtenant, a member of the intelligentsia class (played by Jan Machulski), who finds himself trapped in a villa with three women representing different generations (Barbara Ludwiżanka, Katarzyna Łaniewska, Magdalena Zawadzka).

Sublokator was Majewski's full-length debut, produced under the Kamera Film Production Team. While making the film, Majewski drew inspiration from the grotesque style of Witold Gombrowicz, Bruno Schulz, and Franz Kafka. The debut was widely acclaimed, receiving numerous awards, including the International Federation of Film Critics Award at the International Filmfestival Mannheim-Heidelberg, with particular praise for Ludwiżanka's performance.

== Plot ==
Ludwik, a scientist seeking peace and quiet to focus on his work, rents a room in a villa inhabited exclusively by women, each with her own peculiar obsession. Maria, the owner of the house, dreams of breeding chinchillas and rats. Her niece, Małgorzata, secretly plots to assassinate her aunt, while Kazimiera aspires to turn the residence into a gymnastic rehabilitation center for unemployed women. Ludwik unwillingly becomes entangled in their ambitious schemes. In the final part of the film, after breaking one leg and then the other, Ludwik is confined to bed, completely at the mercy of the women.

== Cast ==
- Jan Machulski as Ludwik
- Barbara Ludwiżanka as Maria Orzechowska, the house administrator
- Katarzyna Łaniewska as Kazimiera, the sportswoman
- Magdalena Zawadzka as Małgosia, Maria’s niece and a student
- Teresa Lipowska as Fredzia Kwaśniewska, the police officer
- Halina Billing-Wohl as Maria’s mother
- Krystyna Feldman as the nurse
- Mieczysław Kalenik as the cyclist
- Edward Wichura as the laundry manager
- Krystyna Mazurówna as the girl appearing with the colonel's ghost
- Witold Pyrkosz as the ghost of the ensign
- Wojciech Rajewski as the dog owner
- Zygmunt Bończa-Tomaszewski as the grandmother
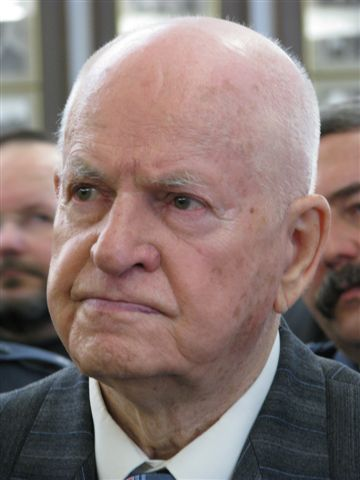
Jan Machulski (2008)

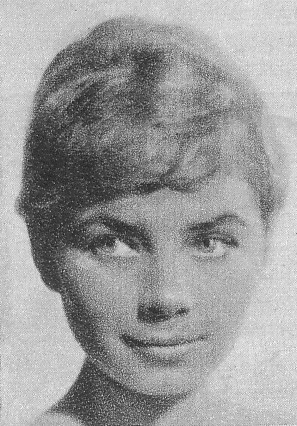
Katarzyna Łaniewska

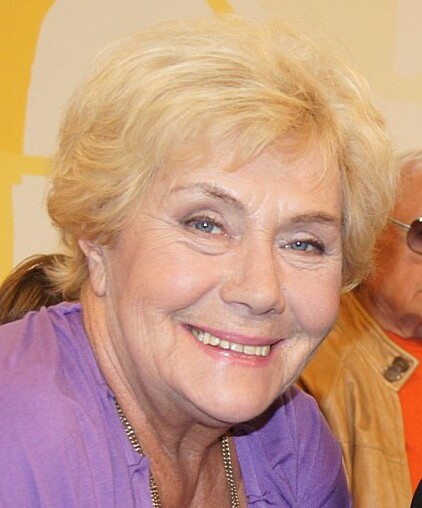
Teresa Lipowska (2012)

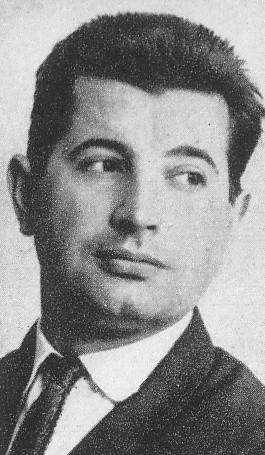
Janusz Majewski, director of the film

== Production ==
Sublokator was produced by the Kamera Film Production Team. The film was directed and written by Janusz Majewski, who later explained the film’s sociological meaning, describing Sublokator as an analysis of a disillusioned generation: "There is a generation in society that didn’t participate in the war, didn’t want to engage in the social revolution, and cannot connect with the new, ideologically empty generation... Disillusioned after the failure of the Polish October, devoid of illusions, and apathetic". Assistant director Jakub Goldberg worked alongside Majewski on the film. Majewski acknowledged influences from Billy Wilder’s films as well as the writings of Witold Gombrowicz, Bruno Schulz, and Franz Kafka. He mentioned that he was particularly inspired by "the best jokes" originating from "Anglo-Saxon humor mixed with Jewish humor in America – very intelligent, though sometimes arrogant and cynical".

Majewski had previously worked with Barbara Ludwiżanka, who played one of the female leads, on a TV play Wierny robot (1961) based on Stanisław Lem's work. He also became acquainted with Jan Machulski, who portrayed Ludwik, on the sets of the TV films Docent H. (1964) and Pierwszy pawilon (1965). Majewski emphasized that the motif of the protagonist being overwhelmed by women wasn't driven by any personal grievances, stating, "I had no scores to settle with women. It just turned out that way, some sort of misogyny, perhaps".

At the review meeting, the film was received positively. More serious comments about the project were made by Jerzy Pomianowski (his request to shorten the length was ultimately not heeded by Majewski) and Wanda Jakubowska, who stated that she "felt somewhat presented as a fool who cannot decipher something but only suspects". However, the project was directed towards production. The music for the film was composed by Andrzej Kurylewicz, while the cinematography was handled by operator Kurt Weber. The set design was created by Tadeusz Wybult, costumes by Barbara Ptak, and editing was the responsibility of Janina Niedźwiecka. Sublokator was produced for 4 million PLN, with the costs recouped after the premiere.

=== Distribution ===
The world premiere of Sublokator took place in October 1966 at the International Filmfestival Mannheim-Heidelberg, where it received the International Federation of Film Critics Award. In Poland, it was released on 7 January 1967. A digitally restored version premiered on 7 November 2016, organized by the Polish Filmmakers Association. In 2019, the restored Sublokator was released on DVD by the Wrocław-based publisher Filmostrada as part of the Klasyka Polskiego Kina Cyfrowa Rekonstrukcja series.

== Reception ==
=== After premiere ===
Sublokator received mostly positive reviews in the press. Lech Pijanowski from Kino considered Majewski's film to be "funny […] without pseudopretensions, yet with real and largely realized ambitions". Aleksander Jackiewicz, in his review for Życie Literackie, praised the director's virtuosity, noting his ability to easily shift "from realism to dreams, from warmth to irony and sarcasm". Stanisław Janicki, in an article for Film, highlighted the "carefully thought-out" structure and consistent style of the film, while also appreciating the character portrait of the characters and the "originality of the idea". A similar opinion was shared by Anna Tatarkiewicz from Film, who observed that despite their caricatured nature, the characters in the film are "fully fleshed-out people", a credit to the well-chosen cast.

Negative voices were rarely articulated. Zygmunt Kałużyński, in a review for Polityka, regarded Sublokator as "a sketch extended beyond measure", where the main characters are "barely sketched", and the style is "somewhat caricatural". However, overall, Majewski's film was appreciated in the country. Wojciech Wierzewski from Ekran summarized: "Sublokator is a smart and precisely constructed comedy […] that restores the lost faith in our cinema". Despite its intimate form, Sublokator was not overlooked abroad, as evidenced by American critic Roger Ebert's opinion that Majewski's film is one of the funniest comedies he has ever seen.

=== Retrospective reception ===
In a retrospective article, Joanna Wojnicka wrote about Sublokator, stating that Majewski "demonstrated his own directorial proficiency and a free juggling of conventions". Wojnicka compared Majewski's debut to the literary grotesques of Witold Gombrowicz and Sławomir Mrożek, as well as films produced by the British Ealing Studios; despite its intimate form, Wojnicka believed the director skillfully combined a grotesque tone with "sophisticated cinematic play". Jerzy Płażewski claimed that Majewski "attacked 'timeless femininity' in a specially created, surreal environment, while maintaining a disturbing resemblance to reality". Monika Talarczyk-Gubała identified Sublokator as one of the few refined comedies in Polish cinema, emphasizing that "none of the subsequent comedies featuring an intellectual as one of the main characters managed to achieve the sophistication and charm of Majewski's sophisticated comedy".

== Awards ==
Year	Festival/Institution	Award	Recipient	Source
1966	International Filmfestival Mannheim-Heidelberg	International Federation of Film Critics Award	Janusz Majewski	
1967	International Film Festival in Cork	Medal	Janusz Majewski	
1967	International Film Festival in Chicago	Silver Hugo	Barbara Ludwiżanka	
1967	International Film Festival in Panama	Directing Award	Janusz Majewski	
1967	International Film Festival in Panama	Screenplay Award	Janusz Majewski	
1967	International Film Festival in Panama	Acting Award	Barbara Ludwiżanka	
