= Witold Pyrkosz =

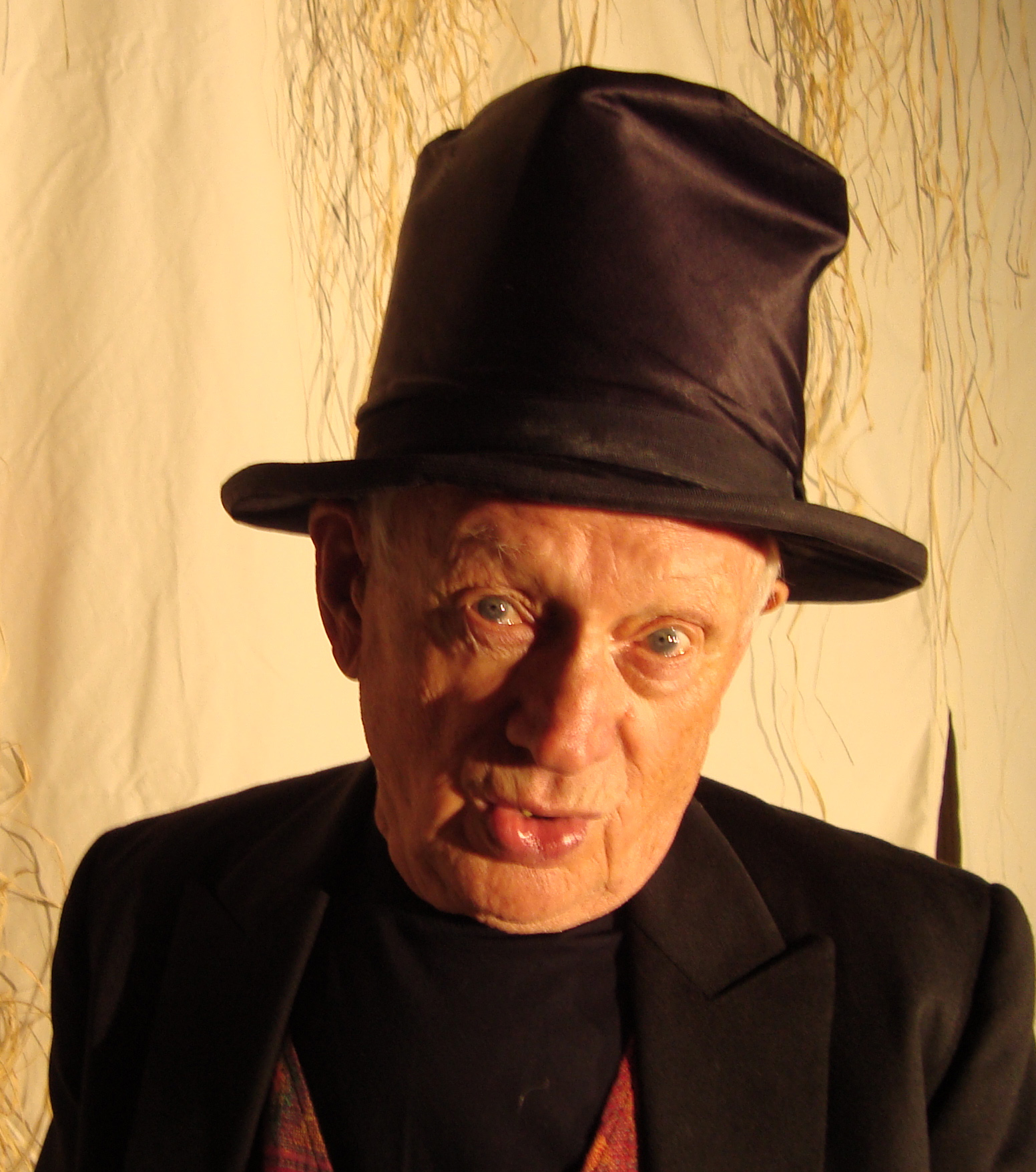
- Witold Pyrkosz (2008), teatr tm
- Born: 24 December 1926; Krasnystaw, Poland
- Died: 22 April 2017 (aged 90); Warsaw, Poland
- Occupation: Actor
- Years active: 1955–2017

Witold Pyrkosz (24 December 1926 – 22 April 2017) was a Polish actor.

He was best known as Lucjan Mostowiak in Polish TV series "M jak miłość", as Pyzdra in "Janosik", as Wichura in "Czterej pancerni i pies", as Balcerek in "Alternatywy 4" and he was also a voice actor of Tow Mater in Polish dubbing of Pixar's Cars series.↵His official birth certificate says that he was born on 1 January 1927 in Lwów; however, he stated that this was done purposely: the date was changed to delay his compulsory conscription for a year, while his mother registered his birthplace as Lwów because it "sounded more regal".

In 1974, Pyrkosz was decorated with the Gold Cross of Merit and in 1984, with the Knight's Cross of Polonia Restituta. In 2009, he received the Medal for Merit to Culture – Gloria Artis.

During martial law, he took part in a media boycott, and in addition, he did not engage in any political activity during the times of the Polish People's Republic. In the years 1999–2006 he was a councilor in the Piaseczno County.

He died on April 22, 2017, in Warsaw, aged 90, of a stroke following complications following pneumonia. Previously, he had heart and circulation problems. On April 28, 2017, after the funeral mass at the Church of the Immaculate Conception of the Blessed Virgin Mary in Góra Kalwaria, the urn with his ashes was placed at the local cemetery.

== Filmography ==
- Cień as "Malutki" (1956)
- Eroica – Symfonia bohaterska w dwóch częściach as Kardasz (1957)
- Rok pierwszy as Migułka (1960)
- Milczące ślady as Świder (1961)
- Kwiecień as Galicki (1961)
- Na białym szlaku as sergeant (1962)
- O dwóch takich, co ukradli księżyc (1962)
- Drugi brzeg as Gabryś (1962)
- Daleka jest droga as partisan (1963)
- Zacne grzechy as Gęba (1963)
- Rękopis znaleziony w Saragossie as reprobate Błażej (1964)
- Pięciu Kalus's friend (1964)
- Panienka z okienka as captain Łabędzia (1964)
- Nieznany as Marcin (1964)
- Potem nastąpi cisza as Leoniak (1965)
- Katastrofa as Roszak (1965)
- Błękitny pokój as English's cousin (1965)
- Sobótki (1965)
- Powrót na Ziemię as Edek (1966)
- Czterej pancerni i pies as Franek Wichura (1966–1970)
- Sublokator
- Zejście do piekła as Max Schmidt (1966)
- Morderca zostawia ślad (1967)
- Stawka większa niż życie as officer SD (1967–1968)
- Sami swoi as Warsaw tenant (1967)
- Wenus z Ille (1967)
- Upiór as Stiepan (1967)
- Lalka as bidder (1968)
- Dzień oczyszczenia as Drobny (1969)
- Znaki na drodze (1969)
- Tylko umarły odpowie as Witek (1969)
- Martwa fala (1970)
- Akcja Brutus as Boruta (1970)
- Meta as Kazik Kaczyński (1971)
- Szerokiej drogi kochanie as journalist Mucha (1971)
- Trąd as Matusiak (1971)
- Kopernik as Płotowski (1972)
- Siedem czerwonych róż czyli Benek Kwiaciarz o sobie i o innych Bartkowiak's friend (1972)
- Ten okrutny, nikczemny chłopak as militiaman (1972)
- Nagrody i odznaczenia as Żurek (1973)
- Godzina samochód as men buying car (1973)
- Janosik as Jędruś Pyzdra (1973)
- Nie ma mocnych as Warsaw tenant (1974)
- To ja zabiłem (1974)
- Złotoas militiaman Antek Krzemek (1974)
- Kazimierz Wielki (1975)
- Hazardziści as Leon Badziak (1975)
- Grzech Antoniego Grudy as Warwaś (1975)
- Złota kaczka as soldier (1976)
- Milioner as clerk (1977)
- Nie zaznasz spokoju as manager (1977)
- Niedziele pewnego małżeństwa w mieście przemysłowym średniej wielkości as Witold (1977)
- Układ krążenia as doctor Kluźniak (1977–1978)
- Wszyscy i nikt as hammerman (1977)
- Without Anesthesia (Bez znieczulenia) (1978)
- Azyl as Zera (1978)
- Ślad na ziemi (1978)
- Na własną prośbę as Stelmaszek (1979)
- Słodkie oczy as Krzysztof Kowal (1979)
- Constans as Mariusz, Witold's chief (1980)
- Chłopiec as Jan Homer (1980)
- Bo oszalałem dla niej as Władzio (1980)
- Jeśli serce masz bijące as Prchlik (1980)
- Kariera Nikodema Dyzmy as Harmonista (1980)
- Nasze podwórko as Maliniak (1980)
- Dom as Parson (1980–2000)
- Urodziny młodego warszawiaka as Jakubowicz (1980)
- Czwartki ubogich as clerk (1981)
- Był jazz as chief NOT (1981)
- Yokohama as writer (1981)
- Wojna światów – Następne stulecie as judge (1981)
- Vabank as Dane (1981)
- Prognoza pogody (1982)
- Niech cię odleci mara (1982)
- Kamienne tablice as Fedunowicz (1983)
- Alternatywy 4 as Balcerek (1983)
- Porcelana w składzie słonia (1984)
- Kim jest ten człowiek (1984)
- Vabank II czyli Riposta as Dane (1984)
- Prywatne śledztwo (1986)
- Czas nadziei as new director (1986)
- A żyć trzeba dalej (1986)
- Rykowisko (1986)
- Kingsajz as Bombalina (1987)
- Ballada o Januszku (1987)
- Śmieciarz (1987)
- Sławna jak Sarajewo as Szafraniec (1987)
- Sonata marymoncka as Sęczek (1987)
- Dziewczynka z hotelu Excelsior as Jan (1988)
- Romeo i Julia z Saskiej Kępy (1988)
- Gorzka miłość as Hermanowicz (1989)
- Rififi po sześćdziesiątce (1989)
- Kramarz jako Jurek (1990)
- Zabić na końcu (1990)
- Latające machiny kontra Pan Samochodzik (1991)
- Trzy dni bez wyroku (1991)
- Szwedzi w Warszawie (1992)
- Przypadek Pekosińskiego (1993)
- Do widzenia wczoraj. Dwie krótkie komedie o zmianie systemu as man watching TV (1993)
- Spółka rodzinna as foreman (1994)
- Piękna warszawianka (Belle de Varsovie, la) as Ludwik (1994)
- Akwarium as Nawigator (1995)
- Wielki człowiek do małych interesów as Pan Ignacy (1995)
- Szabla od komendanta as Gniewisz (1995)
- Bar Atlantic as "Gawędziarz" Sabała (1996)
- Z pianką czy bez as driver (1997–1998)
- Rodziców nie ma w domu (1997)
- Kiler-ów 2-óch as Priest (1999)
- Lot 001 (1999)
- Tarzan as Professor Porter (voice in Polish version) (1999)
- Bajland (2000)
- M jak miłość as Lucjan Mostowiak (2000–2017)
- Tygrysy Europy as Stanisław Pachołek (2003)
- Auta (Cars) as Mater (voice in Polish version) (2006)
- Dylematu 5 as Balcerek (2007)

== Prizes ==
- Polish, television awards "Telekamera 2005" in the category Best Actor
- Polish, television awards "Telekamera 2007" – "Złote Spinki" (Gold Studs) – honorary awards
