= Zacne grzechy =

1963 film

- Directed by: Mieczysław Waśkowski
- Written by: Tadeusz Kwiatkowski; Mieczysław Waśkowski
- Starring: Henryk Bąk
- Cinematography: Jerzy Wójcik
- Edited by: Janina Niedźwiecka
- Music by: Adam Walaciński
- Release date: 22 November 1963
- Running time: 81 minutes
- Country: Poland
- Language: Polish

Zacne grzechy is a 1963 Polish comedy film directed by Mieczysław Waśkowski.

== Cast ==
- Henryk Bąk as Ojciec Makary
- Wiesław Gołas as Zbigniew Trzaska
- Marian Jastrzebski
- Bogumił Kobiela
- Irena Kwiatkowska as Firlejowa
- Franciszek Pieczka
- Witold Pyrkosz as Onufry Geba
- Alicja Sędzińska as Karczmarka Kasia
- Andrzej Szczepkowski as Przeor Ignacy
- Krystyna Kolodziejczyk as Witch Zosia
