= Soltysik =

Soltysik or Sołtysik is a Polish surname. Notable people with the surname include:

- Barbara Sołtysik (born 1942), Polish actress
- Mimi Soltysik (1974–2020), American political activist
- Patricia Soltysik (1950–1974), American urban guerilla
