= Fabisiak =

Fabisiak is a Polish surname. Notable people with the surname include:

- Joanna Fabisiak (born 1960), Polish politician
- Kazimierz Fabisiak (1903–1971), Polish actor, film and theater director
