= Żołnierz zwycięstwa =

- Directed by: Wanda Jakubowska
- Written by: Wanda Jakubowska, Jerzy Borejsza
- Starring: Józef Wyszomirski
- Cinematography: Stanisław Wohl
- Edited by: Lidia Pstrokońska
- Music by: Piotr Perkowski
- Release date: 8 May 1953
- Running time: Part I: 96 minutes, Part II: 119 minutes.
- Country: Poland
- Language: Polish

Żołnierz zwycięstwa (The Soldier of Victory) is a 1953 Polish biographical two-part film (combined running time: 215 minutes), portraying the life of General Karol Świerczewski. The first part, Lata walki (The Years of Struggle) deals with his earlier years, from 1905 to 1941. The second one, Zwycięzca (The Victor) depicts his life from 1944 to his death in 1947.

== Cast ==
- Józef Wyszomirski as General Karol Świerczewski
- Karol Wargin as young Karol Świerczewski
- Jacek Woszczerowicz as Włodzimierz Lenin
- Kazimierz Wilamowski as Józef Stalin
- Gustaw Holoubek as Feliks Dzierżyński
- Józef Kozłowski as Bolesław Bierut
- Rafał Kajetanowicz as Konstanty Rokossowski
- Stefan Śródka as Stefan Pawłowski
- Barbara Drapińska
- Tadeusz Schmidt as Bronisław Bień
- Kazimierz Meres as Władek Wróblewski
- Jerzy Pietraszkiewicz as Mikołaj Gusiew
- Stanisław Gabriel Żeleński as Juan Gonzales
- Tadeusz Łomnicki
- Barbara Rachwalska

== Awards ==
| Year | Award |
|---|---|
| 1953 | Nagroda Państwowa (I stopnia) for Wanda jakubowska |
| 1953 | Nagroda Państwowa (I stopnia) for Stanisław Wohl |
| 1953 | Nagroda Państwowa (II stopnia) for Józef Wyszomirski |
| 1953 | Nagroda Państwowa (II stopnia) for Barbara Drapińska |
