= Piotr Pawłowski =

Piotr Pawłowski may refer to:

- Piotr Pawłowski (canoeist)
- Piotr Pawłowski (actor)
