= Mieczysław Waśkowski =

Polish actor and film director

- Born: 13 August 1929; Kiedrzyn, Poland
- Died: 14 November 2001 (aged 72); Warsaw, Poland
- Occupations: Actor; Film director
- Years active: 1955–1986

Mieczysław Waśkowski (13 August 1929 – 14 November 2001) was a Polish actor and film director. He appeared in more than 20 films and television shows between 1955 and 1978.

== Selected filmography ==
- Zacne grzechy (1963)
- Hazardziści (1976)
