= Desperacja =

Desperację
- Directed by: Zbigniew Kuźmiński
- Written by: Kazimierz Radowicz, Zbigniew Kuźmiński
- Produced by: Jacek Szeligowski
- Cinematography: Zbigniew Hałatek
- Music by: Piotr Marczewski
- Production company: Studio Filmowe Profil
- Release date: 1989
- Country: Poland
- Language: Polish

Desperacja is a Polish historical film, released in 1989. Set in 1862, Colonel Huber, of the Warsaw Tsarist police investigates the Polish underground.

== Cast ==
- Maria Krawczyk as Katarzyna Zaborowska
- Krzysztof Ibisz as Marcin
- Janusz Zakrzeński as colonel Huber
- Leszek Zdybał as major Dymitr Woroncow
- Piotr Zawadzki as Władysław Daniłowski
- Cezary Nowak as Adam Asnyk
- Bogusław Semotiuk as Włodzimierz Wolski
- Krzysztof Kaczmarek as Wiciak
- Wojciech Asiński as Bareta
- Zbigniew Bogdański as Abramowicz
- Michał Szewczuk as spy
