= 5 Dilemma Street =

Polish television series

- Dylematu 5
- Genre: Comedy
- Inspired by: 4 Alternative Street
- Written by: Jacek Kondracki; Janusz Plonski; Jacek Wasilewski
- Directed by: Grzegorz Warchol
- Starring: Magdalena Boczarska; Leon Charewicz; Monika Dryl
- Country of origin: Poland
- Original language: Polish
- No. of series: 1
- No. of episodes: 3

Production
- Production company: Filmcontract Ltd.

Original release
- Release: May 1 – May 3, 2007

Related
- Alternatywy 4 (1986)

5 Dilemma Street (Dylematu 5) is a 2007 Polish TV series directed by Grzegorz Warchoł, a spin-off of the 1983 cult classic Alternatywy 4.

== Cast ==
- Magdalena Boczarska as Katarzyna
- Leon Charewicz as Kolinski
- Monika Dryl as Agnieszka
- Bożena Dykiel as Mieczysława Engelmajer
- Julia Kamińska as Cieta
- Tomasz Karolak as Rychu
- Antoni Królikowski as 'Ostry'
- Jerzy Kryszak as Dr. Zdzislaw Kolek
- Weronika Książkiewicz as Nadia
- Witold Pyrkosz as Józef Barcelek
- Bartlomiej Świniarski as Bartek Wojtaszek
- Dariusz Toczek as Michał Barcelek
- Krzysztof Tyniec as Police Office Wojtaszek
- Wojciech Czerwiński as Police Office 'Gruszka'
- Katarzyna Paskuda as Redactor Monika

== See also ==
- Alternatywy 4
