= Kazimierz Wielki (film) =

1976 Polish film by Ewa Petelska

Kazimierz Wielki is a Polish historical film. It was released in 1975.

== Cast ==
- Krzysztof Chamiec – Kazimierz III Wielki
- Zofia Saretok – Cudka
- Władysław Hańcza – Jarosław Bogoria ze Skotnik
- Wiesław Gołas – Maćko Borkowic
- Ignacy Machowski – Władysław I Łokietek
- Tadeusz Fijewski – Nanker
- Piotr Pawłowski – Jan Grot
- Stefan Friedmann – Sulisław
- Barbara Wrzesińska – Elżbieta Łokietkówna
- Leon Niemczyk – Karol Robert
- Michał Pluciński – Jan Luksemburski
- Bolesław Płotnicki
- Eugeniusz Kamiński – Suchywilk
- Andrzej Szalawski – Olgierd
- Tomasz Neuman – Kazimierz IV (Kaźko Słupski)
- Paweł Unrug
- Stanisław Niwiński – Dobrogost
- Zofia Sykulska-Szancerowa
- Zbigniew Jabłoński
- Remigiusz Rogacki
- Ahmed Hegazi – Tatars' commander
- Władysław Komar – Władzio
- Barbara Rachwalska
- Wiesław Komasa - Dobiegniew
- Andrzej Szaciłło
- Zygmunt Wiaderny
- Stanisław Zatłoka
- Jerzy Kiszkis
