= Kurt Weber =

Polish cinematographer (1928–2015)

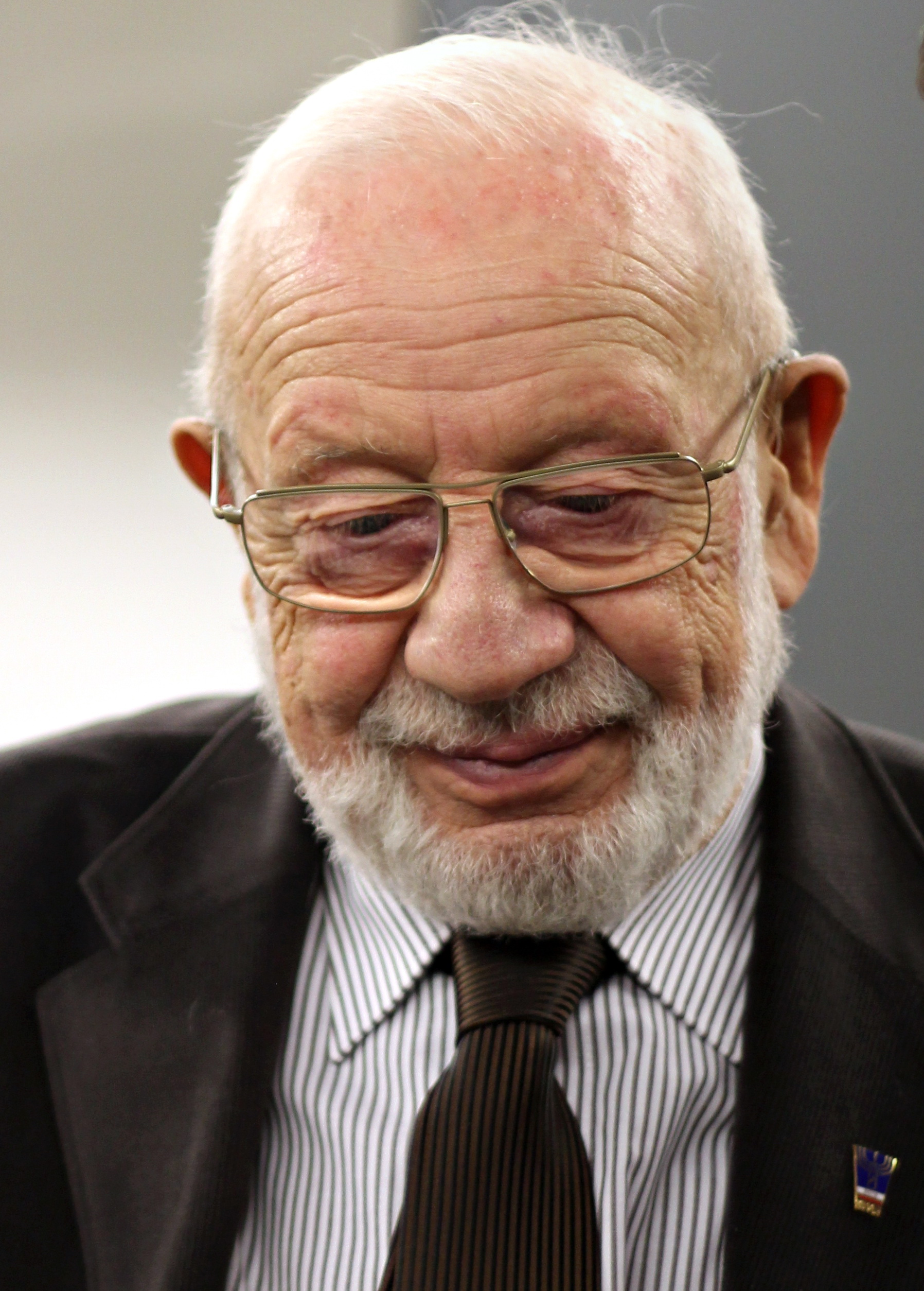
- Kurt Weber in 2014
- Born: 24 May 1928; Cieszyn
- Died: 4 June 2015 (aged 87); Mainz
- Occupation: Cinematographer

Kurt Weber (24 May 1928 – 4 June 2015) was a Polish cinematographer known for working on comedic and dramatic films from the 1950s to the 1980s, primarily in Poland and West Germany.

== Biography ==
He was born in Poland to Jewish family as a son of Edward Weber (1897–1961), the last President of the Jewish Community in Cieszyn. In 1953 he graduated in cinematography from the Łódź Film School. In 1955, he directed documentary film Pod jednym niebem, awarded at the Karlovy Vary Film Festival in 1956.

In the early 1960s (other source claims in 1953) he was employed as a teacher at the Cinematography Faculty at the Łódź Film School; in 1967 he was appointed vice-dean of the faculty. In 1969 he emigrated to West Germany.

He was buried at the Jewish cemetery in Mainz.

== Filmography ==
=== Cinematographer ===
- 1950: Dwie brygady
- 1959: Kamienne niebo
- 1959: Baza ludzi umarłych (The Depot of the Dead)
- 1960: Spotkania w mroku (Meetings in the Twilight)
- 1961: Ludzie z pociągu (Panic on the Train)
- 1962: All Souls' Day (Zaduszki)
- 1962: Jutro premiera
- 1963: Black Wings
- 1963: Wiano
- 1964: Późne popołudnie
- 1966: Salto (Somersault (U.S. title); also translated as The Dance)
- 1966: Sublokator
- 1967: Morderca zostawia ślad
- 1966: Piekło i niebo
- 1969: Sąsiedzi
- 1976: Schneeglöckchen blühen im September (Snowdrops Bloom in September)
- 1976: Hauptlehrer Hofer (Schoolmaster Hofer)
- 1978: Winterspelt
- 1981: Der Mond ist nur a nackerte Kugel (The Moon's Only A Naked Ball)

=== Director and writer ===
- Racjonalizator (1950), short film made in a film school
- Pod jednym niebem (1955), documentary film

Source.
