= Nina Andrycz =

Polish actress (1912–2014)

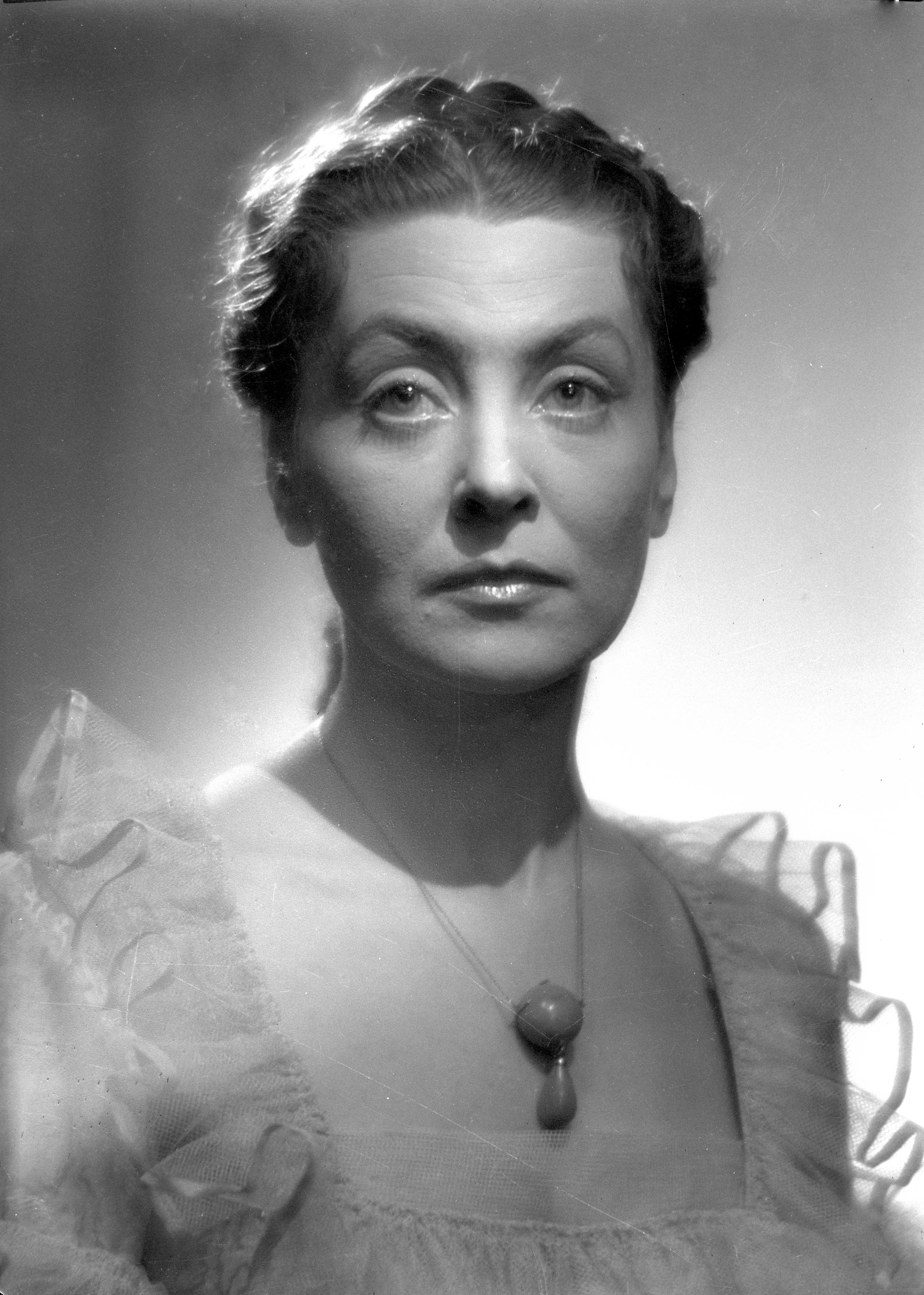
- Born: 11 November 1912; Brest, Russian Empire
- Died: 31 January 2014 (aged 101); Warsaw, Poland
- Occupation: Actress
- Years active: 1934–2008

Nina Andrycz (11 November 1912 – 31 January 2014) was a Polish theater, film and television actress and, from 1947 to 1968, the wife of Prime Minister Józef Cyrankiewicz. She studied law at the Wilno University. She was one of the first noted customers of the photographer Zofia Nasierowska.

== Selected filmography ==
- Warsaw Premiere (1951)
- Before Twilight (2009)

== See also ==
- List of centenarians (actors, filmmakers and entertainers)
