= Zofia Nasierowska =

Polish photographer (1938–2011)

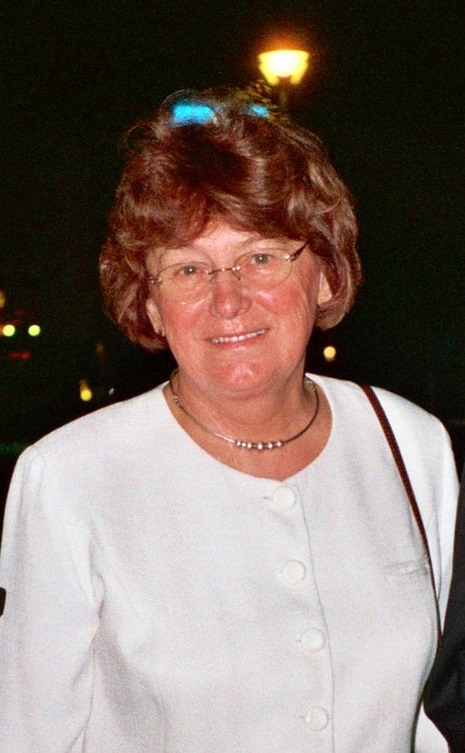
- Nasierowska in 2007
- Born: 24 April 1938; Łomianki
- Died: 3 October 2011 (aged 73); Warsaw
- Burial place: Powązki Military Cemetery
- Education: Łódź Film School
- Spouse: Janusz Majewski
- Children: 2

Zofia Nasierowska (24 April 1938 – 3 October 2011) was a Polish portrait photographer who created images of Polish celebrities.

== Life ==
Nasierowska was born in Łomianki in 1938. Her father, Eugeniusz Nasierowski, was a noted photographer. She took to photography as a child at the age of seven and within four years she was exhibiting her work. Her father was a natural teacher but she continued her interest at Łódź Film School. Her fellow students included Janusz Majewski, whom she would later marry, and Roman Polanski.

Her portrait photos were said to make women look more romantic and men look more subtle. She attracted attention when she took a photo of the actress Lucyna Winnicka which made the cover of the magazine Ekran in 1958. She was known for her lighting which produced monochrome images that made her subjects look like film stars. One of her subjects asked her to light her TV studio for her when they saw her skill in taking her photo.

An early subject was Nina Andrycz who told Nasierowska that she used a mirror to get the right look in her face. Nasierowska at the time was just twenty but she believed that although some women believed that they could improve their look while looking in the mirror Nasierowska said this was a fallacy. She took photos of Nina Andrycz allowing her to use her mirror, but the ones chosen for publication were created without the mirror.

From 1956 she was a member of the Polish photography group ZPAF (Związek Polskich Artystów Fotografików). She was honored with the title of "Artiste FIAP" given by the International Federation of Photographic Art.

In 2009 Zofia Turowska published an illustrated biography of her life.

== Death and legacy ==
She died on 3 October 2011, in Warsaw after a long illness. She was buried in the Military Cemetery in Powązki (section D31-tuje-3). She was included in Karolina Lewandowska's book, She-documentalists: Polish Women Photographers of the 20th Century.

In April 2023 she was remembered with a Google Doodle on what would have been her 85th birthday.
