= 4 Alternative Street =

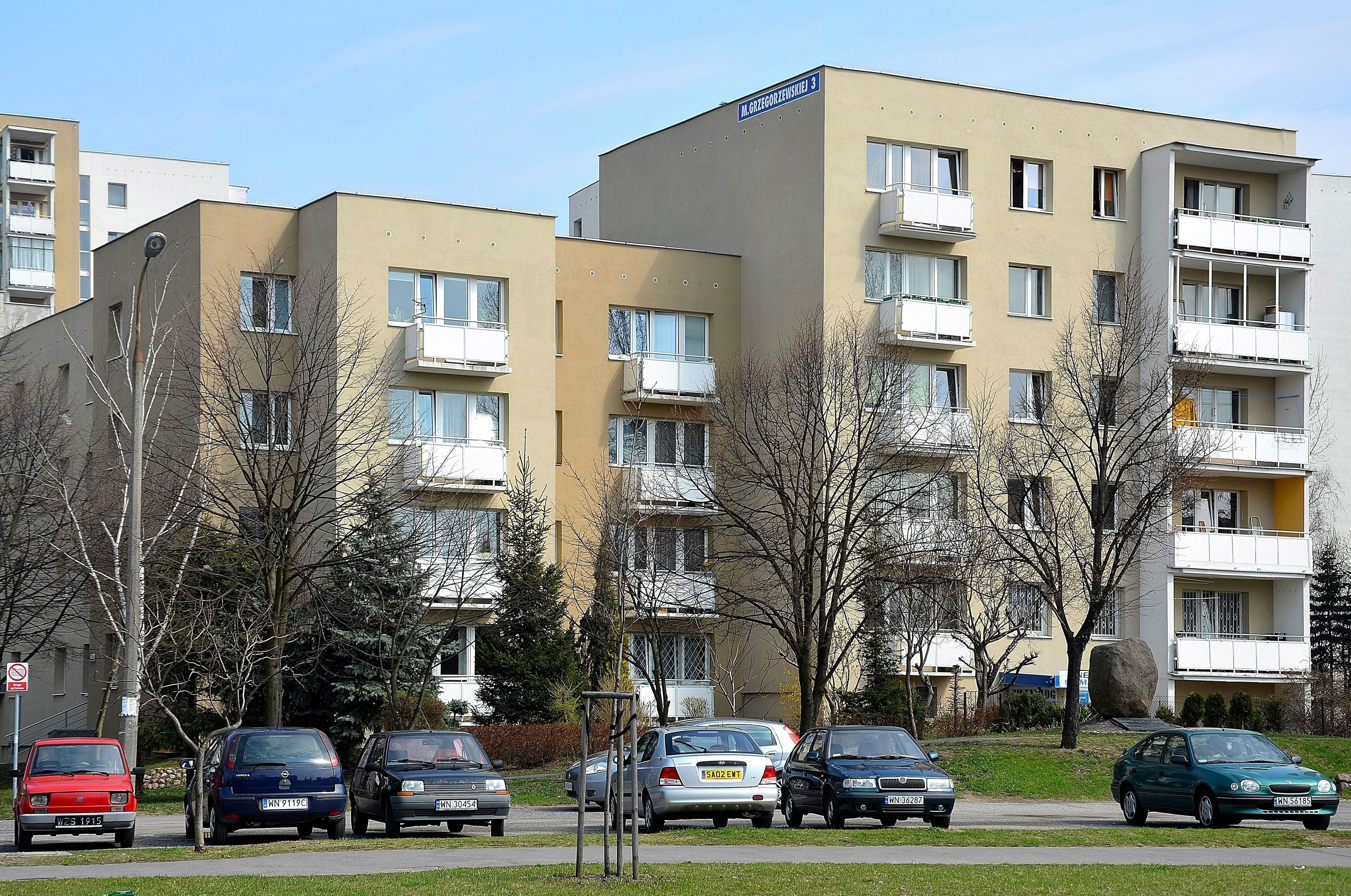
- Block of flats at 3 Marii Grzegorzewskiej Street in Warsaw where the series was shot
- Alternatywy 4
- Genre: Sitcom; Satire
- Written by: Stanisław Bareja; Janusz Płoński; Maciej Rybiński
- Directed by: Stanisław Bareja
- Composer: Jerzy Matuszkiewicz
- Country of origin: Poland
- Original language: Polish
- No. of seasons: 1
- No. of episodes: 9

Original release
- Network: TVP
- Release: 30 September 1986 – 18 January 1987

4 Alternative Street (Polish: Alternatywy 4, [ˌaltɛrnaˈtɨvɨ ˈʧ̑tɛrɨ]) is a Polish comedy TV series that was completed in 1983 and, due to the censorship, first aired only in 1986. Many famous Polish actors appeared in the series. The filming location used in Alternatywy 4 was a residential complex, still in existence at 3 Marii Grzegorzewskiej Street in Warsaw, Poland. The series was a satire of life under the Communist rule in Poland.

The series title is a result of a dispute among local councilors on what to name a new street in the development (in episode 3). Annoyed by the lack of consensus, one of them quips: "There must be some alternative".

The dialogues, which intended to ridicule the absurdities of everyday life of the times, had to be written in a way that they would be approved by the censorship office. Even then, some scenes had to be removed from the final cut. Thirty years after the series was filmed, it underwent a digital reconstruction and the initially deleted scenes were added, after they had been found in the archives of TVP.

In 2005, one of the streets in Ursynów district, where the series plot had taken place, was officially named Alternatywy to commemorate the series. The residential building, where most of the scenes were shot, bears a plaque, that aside from the actual street name (M. Grzegorzewskiej 3) also contains an inscription, "Formerly Alternatywy 4".

== Plot ==
The series revolves around inhabitants of a newly built housing development in Warsaw who won housing assignments after years of patient waiting. They come from various backgrounds and have distinct personalities, and their daily interactions often lead to hilarious encounters. The main character is Stanisław Anioł, a sneaky and cunning estate manager who tries to exert control over every resident. The residents must additionally navigate the challenges of bureaucracy and petty politics to survive. Among the residents are Kotek and Kołek – a crane operator and a doctor who share a similar surname, which leads to them mistakenly being assigned the same apartment to share. There is the street-smart alcoholic Józef Balcerek who tries to hide his criminal machinations from Anioł's watchful gaze. There is the young woman Ewa Majewska, whose only outlet from the banality of her life is working a secret night-shift as a stripper.

The circumstances of the characters are different, but they all experience the bizarre oddities of life in Poland of the time, presented in a satirical way.

== Episodes ==
Story	Title	Directed by	Written by	Original release date
1	"Przydział (The Assignment)"	Stanislaw Bareja	Stanisław Bareja, Janusz Płoński and Maciej Rybiński	30 November 1986
Impatient citizens await the results of the next housing "lottery", a list posting the names of lucky winners who would be entitled to a government-provided apartment in Communist-era Poland. But the lucky winners find that winning a new housing assignment comes with its own set of problems.
2	"Przeprowadzka (Moving in)"	Stanislaw Bareja	Stanisław Bareja, Janusz Płoński and Maciej Rybiński	7 December 1986
After bureaucratic missteps delay the construction of the housing residents' new home, a well-placed bribe puts the project back on schedule. When the move in day finally arrives, the residents find themselves dealing with new challenges under the watchful eye of their arrogant estate manager.
3	"Pierwsza noc (The First Night)"	Stanislaw Bareja	Stanisław Bareja, Janusz Płoński and Maciej Rybiński	14 December 1986
A debate among municipal councilors leads to the decision to call the new street “Alternatywy”, rather than naming it after a historical figure. The new tenants located at Alternatywy 4 mingle and try to organize a tenant’s association without alerting their suspicious estate manager.
4	"Profesjonaliści (The Professionals)"	Stanislaw Bareja	Stanisław Bareja, Janusz Płoński and Maciej Rybiński	21 December 1986
As the residents settle in, they are visited by opportunistic handymen seeking to correct the building’s shoddy construction work. The estate manager continues to spy on the residents and has begun reading their mail. He learns that a prominent Party apparatchik will move into the building.
5	"20-ty stopień zasilania (The Blackout)"	Stanislaw Bareja	Stanisław Bareja, Janusz Płoński and Maciej Rybiński	24 December 1986
A coal shortage at the power plant causes an outage at Alternatywy 4 during a cold spell. The resourceful residents take matters into their own hands by repurposing an old steam locomotive to re-power the building. Meanwhile, the estate manager takes advantage of an American academic visiting from Harvard.
6	"Gołębie (The Pigeons)"	Stanislaw Bareja	Stanisław Bareja, Janusz Płoński and Maciej Rybiński	28 December 1986
The estate manager enlists some residents to spy on other residents. When an alcoholic refuses to cooperate, the manager forges a letter summoning him for government-mandated rehab. The alcoholic relents, but is distracted when his pigeons are scared off by a rogue gunshot.
7	"Spisek (The Plot)"	Stanislaw Bareja	Stanisław Bareja, Janusz Płoński and Maciej Rybiński	4 January 1987
The residents have had enough of participating in time-consuming building social functions and chores that the manager has mandated. They organize and deliver a petition to the housing association seeking to replace the manager, but are outmaneuvered by the clever manager himself.
8	"Wesele (The Wedding)"	Stanislaw Bareja	Stanisław Bareja, Janusz Płoński and Maciej Rybiński	11 January 1987
The alcoholic hosts a wedding for a relative and invites the building to celebrate. The manager disrupts the festivities by shutting the power off and mandating all residents attend an impromptu meeting. But the intervention of a Communist apparatchik saves the day.
9	"Upadek (The Fall)"	Stanislaw Bareja	Stanisław Bareja, Janusz Płoński and Maciej Rybiński	18 January 1987
The estate manager learns of the impending arrival of an international delegation of mayors and sees a chance for advancement. He harasses his residents to prepare a grand welcome for the delegation, but the residents concoct a plan of their own to sabotage the visit and avenge themselves.

== Cast ==
From the Internet Movie Database

- Roman Wilhelmi as Stanisław Anioł, a former head of a Communist committee who is demoted and becomes an estate manager in a new housing development.
- Bronisław Pawlik as Dionizy Cichocki, an elderly man who stubbornly fights a bureaucratic mistake that deprives him of his housing assignment.
- Stanisława Celińska as Bożena Lewicka, a homely teacher struggling to convince her apathetic partner, Zenobiusz Furman, to marry her.
- Zofia Czerwińska as Zofia Balcerkowa, the abused wife of the criminal and alcoholic Józef Balcerek
- Bożena Dykiel as Miećka Aniołowa, the estate manager's dutiful wife who helps her husband spy on the housing residents.
- Kazimierz Kaczor as Zygmunt Kotek, a mobile crane operator assigned to the same apartment as another man with a similar last name.
- Wojciech Pokora as Docent Zenobiusz Furman, an avid hunter who works as the estate manager's informant and draws the ire of his fellow residents.
- Witold Pyrkosz as Józef Balcerek, a well-connected street smart criminal and alcoholic with a collection of prized pet pigeons.
- Mieczysław Voit as Prof. Ryszard Dąb-Rozwadowski, a professor of law and dissident intellectual, who fellow residents often turn to

mediate disputes.

- Hanna Bieniuszewicz as Ewa Majewska, the Majewski's kindly daughter who moonlights as a stripper to earn money to support her family.
- Jerzy Kryszak as Dr. Zdzisław Kołek, a physician assigned the same apartment as Zygmunt Kotek due to their similar surnames.
- Bolesław Płotnicki as Antoni Kierka, an elderly man in a wheelchair whose handicap is taken advantage of to skip lines at markets
- Barbara Rachwalska as Tekla Wagnerówna, a kind elderly woman who falls in love with Antoni Kierka.
- Jerzy Turek as Tadeusz Kubiak, the harassed husband of Elżbieta Kolińska-Kubiak who starts an affair with a neighbor.
- Ewa Ziętek as Zosia, Professor Dąb-Rozwadowski's housekeeper who has an affair with Tadeusz Kubiak.
- Halina Kowalska as Elżbieta Kolińska-Kubiak, a demanding and narcissistic professional singer.
- Gustaw Lutkiewicz as the politically savvy President of the housing association.
- Zdzisław Rychter (handyman)
- Ryszard Raduszewski as Abraham Lincoln, a Harvard-educated African-American tourist who rents an apartment in the building.
- Wiesław Gołas (Mr. Majewski)
- Elżbieta Jagielska (Ms. Majewska)
- Stanisław Bareja (Police Officer Parys)
- Wojciech Siemion (Mr. Dominek)
- Krystyna Tkacz (Kotkowa)
- Anna Chitro (Kołkowa)
- Janusz Gajos (Jan Winnicki)
- W. Kozera-Hyży ('Eva 1', robot)
- Marian Łącz (Matraszak)
- Emil Karewicz (Leberka)
- Jerzy Bończak (Marek Manc)
- Cezary Julski (Franuś Lewandowski)
- Maciej Pietrzyk (porter)
- Stanisław Gawlik (poet)

== See also ==
- 5 Dilemma Street
