= Józef Nowak =

Polish actor (1925–1984)

- Born: 8 April 1925; Kończyce, Poland
- Died: 16 January 1984 (aged 58); Warsaw, Poland
- Occupation: Actor
- Years active: 1951-1980

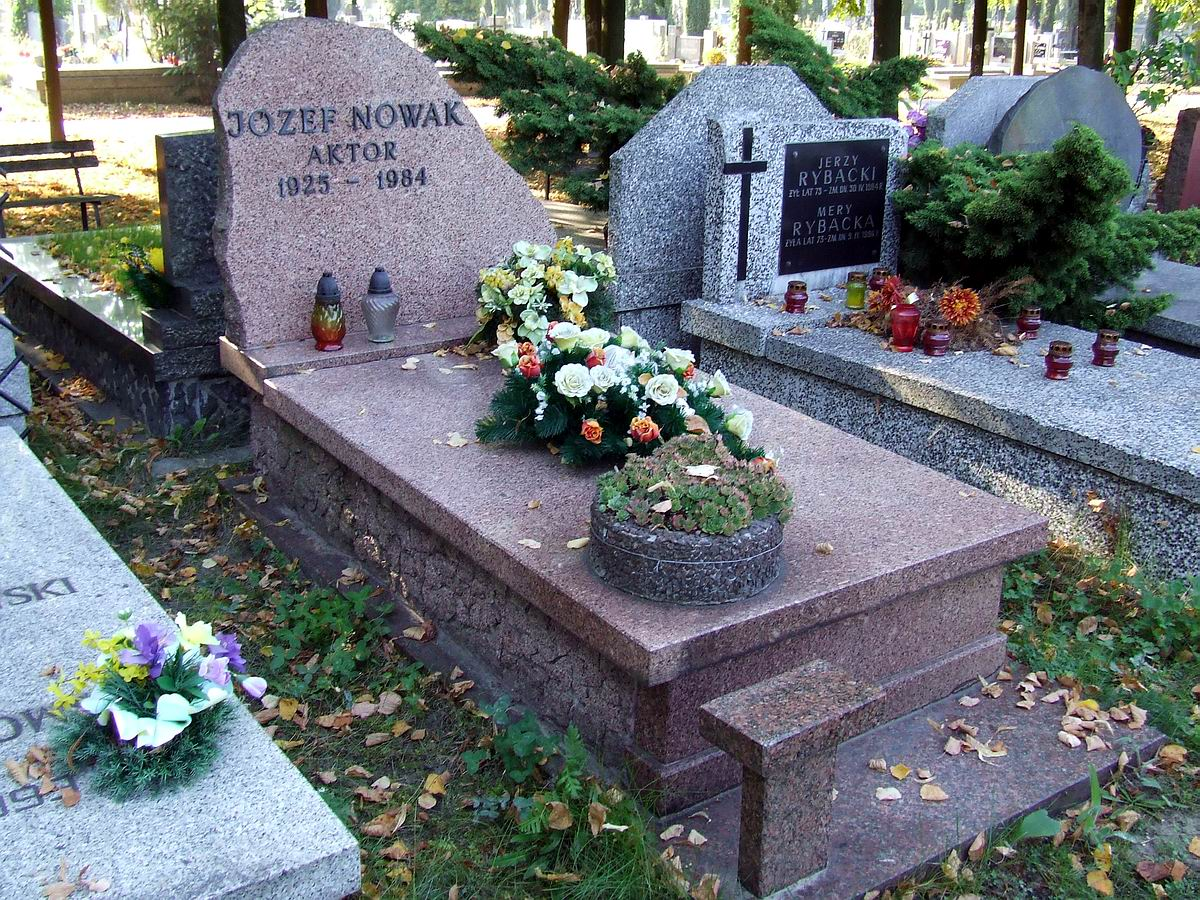
Grave of Józef Nowak at the Wólka Cemetery in Warsaw

Józef Nowak (8 April 1925 – 16 January 1984) was a Polish actor. He appeared in more than 50 films and television shows between 1951 and 1980.

== Selected filmography ==
- Warsaw Premiere (1951)
- Drugi brzeg (1962)
- Westerplatte (1967)
- Stawka większa niż życie (1967)
- Zamach stanu (1980)
