= Ewa Serwa =

Polish actress

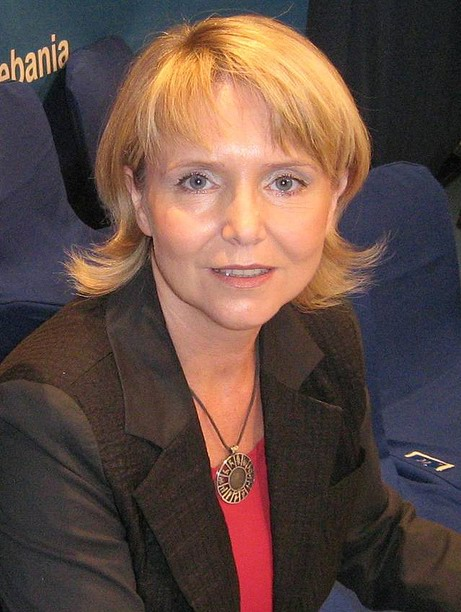
- Ewa Serwa in 2007
- Born: 7 October 1956 (age 69); Kraków, Poland
- Occupation: Actress
- Years active: 1978–present

Ewa Serwa (born 7 October 1956) is a Polish actress. She has appeared in more than 45 films and television shows since 1978.

== Selected filmography ==
- Uczennica ("Schoolgirl") (1982), as Anna Hinelowna
- Na Wspólnej (2003)
- Life Feels Good (2013)
- The Office PL (2021)
