= Andrzej Kurylewicz =

Polish composer and musician (1932–2007)

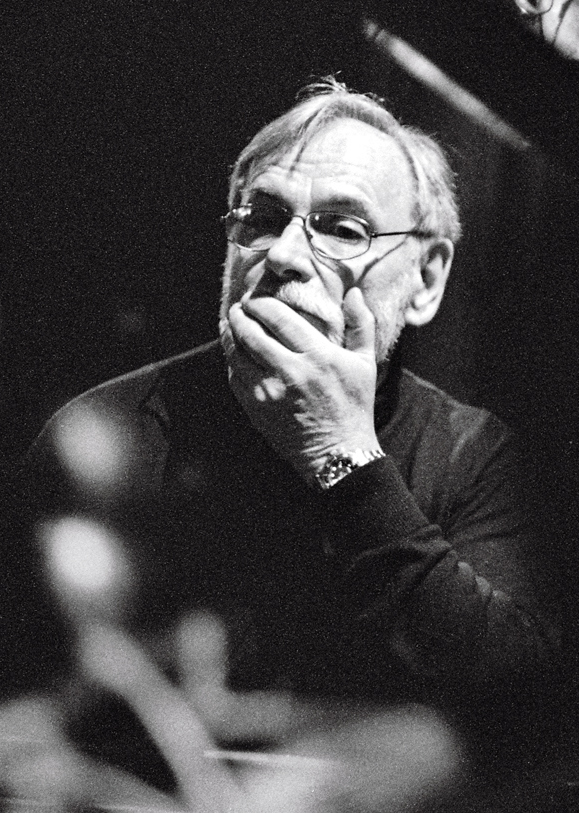
- Born: Andrzej Roman Kurylewicz; November 24, 1932; Lwów, Second Polish Republic
- Died: April 12, 2007 (aged 74); Konstancin-Jeziorna, Poland
- Education: Academy of Music in Kraków
- Occupations: Composer; pianist; trombonist; trumpeter; conductor
- Spouse: Wanda Warska (since 1958)
- Children: 1, Gabriela Kurylewicz (b. 1971)
- Awards: Knight's Cross of the Order of Polonia Restituta (1979); Prix Italia (1981); Order of Merit of the Federal Republic of Germany (2001); Officer's Cross of the Order of Polonia Restituta (2007)
- Musical career
- Genres: Film music; Contemporary classical music; Jazz
- Instruments: Piano, Trombone, Trumpet

Andrzej Roman Kurylewicz (Polish pronunciation: [ˈand͡ʐɛj kurɨˈlɛvit͡ʂ]; 24 November 1932 – 12 April 2007), was a Polish composer, pianist, trombonist, trumpet player and conductor. His works range from classical music, including both chamber and orchestral music, to theatrical, film, ballet, and jazz. He was shaped in the tradition of classical music and pioneered Polish jazz, pursuing a parallel career. He gained nationwide popularity by writing music for Janusz Morgenstern's 1976 TV series Polskie drogi.

== Life ==
=== Education ===
Kurylewicz was born in Lwów, Second Polish Republic (now Lviv, Ukraine). His musical education began at the Lwów Music School under Stanisław Ludkiewycz when he was aged 6. From 1946 to 1950, he continued his education at the Instytut Muzyczny in Gliwice. Between 1950 and 1954, he studied classical piano under Henryk Sztompka and composition under Stanisław Wiechowicz at the Państwowa Wyższa Szkoła Muzyczna in Kraków. In 1954, he was excluded from academic life owing to Kurylewicz's professional involvement with jazz and his refusal to join the Polish United Workers' Party (PZPR, or Polish Communist Party).

=== Career ===
In 1954, by invitation of Władysław Szpilman, Kurylewicz accepted a full-time position at the Polish Radio in Kraków and found his own ensemble, Sekstet Organowy Polskiego Radia. In 1957, he became the first Polish musician from behind the Iron Curtain to receive the first prize at the Stuttgart Jazz Festival in West Germany. In 1958, he married the singer Wanda Warska and wrote his Opus 1 for piano solo, Somnambulicy and film music for Ostatni Strzał. The following year, he made his debut as a theatre music composer with Książę Niezłomny by Juliusz Słowacki and directed by Mieczysław Kotlarczyk. In addition, he wrote music for the film "Powrót", directed by Jerzy Passendorfer. From 1964 to 1966, he directed the Orkiestra Polskiego Radia i Telewizji in Warsaw and lost this position after his second refusal to join the PZPR. In the period of 1964-68 he wrote his Opus 2, Concerto na tematy Adama Jarzębskiego (I, II, III).

In 1965, Kurylewicz set up Piwnica Artystyczna Kurylewiczów together with his wife, Wanda Warska, and was joined by his daughter Gabriela Kurylewicz in 1987. From 1969 to 1978, he became the founder and leader of the ensemble Formacja Muzyki Współczesnej (Contemporary Music Formation), known for performing contemporary jazz and European avant garde music, and they travelled in the West. He established himself as a theatrical composer, working together with directors such as Mieczysław Kotlarczyk, Zygmunt Hübner, Adam Hanuszkiewicz, Jerzy Gruza and Erwin Axer, and wrote film music for Jerzy Passendorfer, Janusz Morgenstern (Polskie drogi 1976), Ryszard Ber (Lalka 1977, Droga, Domy z deszczu), Janusz Majewski (Sublokator, Lekcja martwego języka), Zbigniew Kuźmiński (Nad Niemnem), and Janusz Zaorski, (Panny i Wdowy).

From 1970 onwards, Kurylewicz mainly composed classical music: solo instrumental works (for example Piano Crumbs for piano, Impromptu avec Romarin for harpsichord, Due Pezzi Semplici for organ, Drzeworyt I and II for flute, Moods for double bass and Tubesque for tuba); sacred music (Missa Brevis, Te Deum, Five Psalms after the Roman Missal, Ave Maris Stella, Ave Maria); chamber works (String Quartets I, II, III and IV, String Trio Dormitina and three piano trios Trio per Tre, Tango Rubio, El Dancion Sentimental); piano quintets (Gabriela, Larghetto Kamienie Staromiejskie) and brass trios and quintets. Moreover, he wrote for string orchestra (Psalm 60, Szkic do Krajobrazu, Sonet, Serenata Leopolitana, Witraż w Miejscowości N.) and symphonic orchestra (Schema Quatro per Quatro, Adagio da Dramma, Suita Symfoniczna Pan Tadeusz, Suita Symfoniczna Polskie Drogi, two Symphonic Poems In Verona and Godzina się Zniża, Symphonic Sketch Dziesięć Sekwencji Nad Niemnem and Msza Warszawska).

Kurylewicz wrote congenial song cycles set to the poems of Jan Kochanowski, Juliusz Słowacki, Zygmunt Krasiński, Cyprian Kamil Norwid, Stefan Garczyński, Alexander Pushkin, Reiner Maria Rilke, Osip Mandelstam, Czesław Miłosz, Halina Poświatowska, Maria Pawlikowska-Jasnorzewska, Jarosław Iwaszkiewicz, Stanisław Grochowiak, Zbigniew Herbert, Carmina Burana, German baroque poets, Julia Hartwig, Ludmiła Marjańska, Gabriela Kurylewicz and lyrics by Wanda Warska and Agnieszka Osiecka.

In 1999, Kurylewicz established the Kurylewicz Trio (Andrzej Kurylewicz - piano, Paweł Pańta - double bass, Cezary Konrad - percussion) which Bohdan Pociej described as "enchanting by its lightness, charme, elegance, taste, precision, concise harmonies, innovative variations, form and lyricism." During the last years of his life he performed piano works by Karol Szymanowski and Frederic Chopin. Every Monday, with his Kurylewicz Trio, with Wanda Warska and Gabriela Kurylewicz he performed in the Piwnica Artystyczna Kurylewiczów. In 1984 he became the Composer in Residence of the City of Wilhelmshaven (West Germany) and in 1989 he began a collaboration with the University of Kansas (USA).

Kurylewicz died of a heart attack in his sleep on 12 April 2007 in Konstancin-Jeziorna and was buried at the Powązki Cemetery in Warsaw. From 2007, according to the will of the composer, Gabriela Kurylewicz and her '"Fundacja Forma" published the critical and complete edition of his Opera Omnia, and initiates and produces the annual festival of music and poetry, the "Andrzej Kurylewicz Music Days". His music is performed at the "Piwnica Artystyczna Kurylewiczów" in Warsaw and regularly at Steinway Hall in London; the complete list of his works is available on the website of the Piwnica Artystyczna Kurylewiczów and Fundacja Forma.

== Selected honours and awards ==
- Officer's Cross of the Order of Polonia Restituta, (posthumously), 2007
- Order of Merit of the Federal Republic of Germany, I Class, 2001
- Medal Miasta Warszawy, 1997
- Prix Italia, 1981
- City of Warsaw Award, 1978
- PRiTV, 1965

== Discography ==
As Andrzej Kurylewicz Quintet:

- Go Right (Polskie Nagrania Muza, 1963)
- 10+8/Ten+Eight (Polski Nagrania Muza, 1968)

== Selected compositions ==
- Music for the film Powrót / Return, dir. Jerzy Passendorfer (1959–1960)
- Concerto on themes from Jarzębski for trombone and jazz orchestra (1966)
- Rok Polski / Polish Year, 12 songs for amplified voice and orchestra (1975)
- Schema Quattro per Quattro per archi, tromboni e batteria (1975)
- Pięć Rozgrzewek / Five Warm-ups for solo piano (1975)
- Adagio da Dramma for orchestra (1976)
- Music for the film Polskie Drogi / Polish Roads, dir. Janusz Morgenstern (1976–1978)
- Screenplay for symphony orchestra and tape (1977)
- Trzy Pieśni Romantyczne / Three Romantic Songs for baritone and piano to the poems of Alexander Pushkin (1977–1979)
- Music for the film Lalka / The Doll, dir. Ryszard Ber (1977–78)
- Psalm 60 per orchestra d'archi (1978)
- Episodi per Tre for horn, harp and double bass (1978)
- Capriccio per oboe solo (1978)
- Nastroje / Moods for solo double bass (1979)
- Szkic Krajobrazu / Landscape Sketch for strings (1979)
- Te Deum per soprano ed organum (1979)
- Music for the film Lekcja Martwego Języka / Lesson of a Dead Language, dir. Janusz Majewski (1979)
- Pięć Pieśni wg Jana Kochanowskiego / Five Songs based on Jan Kochanowski for voice and string orchestra with piano (1980)
- Sonet per archi (1980)
- String Quartet No. 1 (1980)
- Music for the film Droga / Road, dir. Ryszard Ber (1980)
- Capriccio a due per flauto e violoncello (1981)
- Pięć Pieśni wg Czesława Miłosza / Five Songs based on Czesław Miłosz for voice and string orchestra with piano (1981)
- Salve Regina for boys' choir and organ (1981)
- Hail Mary [version I] for soprano and organ (1981)
- Hail Mary [version II] for soprano and string quartet (1981)
- Symphonic Poem No. 1 "In Verona" for mixed chorus and great symphony orchestra (1981)
- Little String Quartet (1982)
- String Quartet No. 2 "Stuttgart" (1982)
- Drzeworyt 1 / Woodcut 1 for solo flute (1982)
- Missa Brevis for soprano and organ (1982–1983)
- String Quartet No. 3 "Easter" (1983)
- Drzeworyt 2 / Woodcut 2 for solo flute (1983)
- Serenata per archi (1983)
- Due Pezzi Semplici per organo solo (1983)
- Three Psalms for alto and piano (1984)
- Das Urteil der Zeit, 8 songs for tenor and piano (1984)
- Two Songs from the "Carmina Burana" Cycle for medium voice and harpsichord (1984)
- Duetto Lirico per violino e pianoforte (1984)
- Tubesque per tuba solo (1985)
- Symphonic Poem No. 2 'Godzina się zniża'&nbp / &nbp'The Hour Descends' for mixed chorus, piano concertante and great symphony orchestra (1985)
- Tre Salmi per alto voce e pianoforte (ossia cembalo ossia organo) (1985)
- Anima Christi I per soprano solo (1985)
- Nord See Klänge [version I] for tape and ship's horns (1986)
- Nord See Klänge [version II] for tape and any solo improviser (1986)
- Due Altri Salmi per alto voce e pianoforte (1986)
- Dormitina for string trio (1986)
- Music for the film Nad Niemnem / On the Banks of the Niemen, dir. Zbigniew Kuźmiński (1986)
- Blow the Wind for wind quintet (1987)
- Seven Songs to Poems by Osip Mandelstam for alto and piano (1987)
- Witraż w Miejscowości N. / Stained-glass Window in the Town of N. for 13 strings (1987)
- Ave Maris Stella for soprano and cello (1987)
- Anima Christi II per soprano e organo (1987–88)
- Due Salmi Per Festa Dei Morti for alto, organ and string orchestra (1988)
- Watsonbrass in Charge for brass quintet (1989)
- Time For Jazz (Blow The Past) for wind quintet (1989)
- Take on - Take off for orchestra (1990)
- Gabriela per strumenti d'archi e pianoforte ossia cembalo (1990)
- Music for the film Panny i Wdowy / Maidens and Widows, dir. Janusz Zaorski (1991)
- Impromptu with Rosemary for solo harpsichord (1992)
- Trio per tre per clarinetto, viola e pianoforte (1994)
- New Year's Quartet for clarinet, trombone, cello and piano (1995)
- Adagietto for voice, string quartet and piano (1996)
- Dziesięć Notatek / Ten Memos for piano (1996–1997)
- Etto - "Kamienie Staromiejskie" / "Old Town Stones" for piano and strings (1997)
- Three Songs based on Julia Hartwig [version I] for alto voice and piano (1997)
- Three Songs based on Julia Hartwig [version II] for mezzo-soprano and piano (1997)
- Msza za Miasto Warszawę / Warsaw Mass, Op. 61 for two low voices, mixed chorus, wind instruments and orchestra (1997–1998)
- Pavana per piano solo (1998)
- Prayer for solo piano (1998)
- El Dancion Sentimental for piano, violin and cello (1998)
- String Quartet No. 4 "Of the Prayer" (1999)

== See also ==
- List of Polish composers
- Music of Poland
