= Potem nastąpi cisza =

1965 film

- Directed by: Janusz Morgenstern
- Written by: Zbigniew Safjan; Janusz Morgenstern
- Starring: Tadeusz Łomnicki
- Release date: 1965
- Running time: 93 minutes
- Country: Poland
- Language: Polish

Potem nastąpi cisza is a 1965 Polish drama film directed by Janusz Morgenstern.

== Cast ==
- Tadeusz Łomnicki as Major Swietowiec
- Marek Perepeczko as Lieutenant Kolski
- Daniel Olbrychski as Olewicz
- Barbara Brylska as Ewa
- Barbara Sołtysik as Zosia
- Kazimierz Fabisiak as Zosia's Father
- Witold Pyrkosz as Leoniak
- Eugeniusz Korczarowski as Adam
- Damian Damięcki as Andrzej
- Tadeusz Schmidt as General
