= Henryk Bąk =

Polish actor

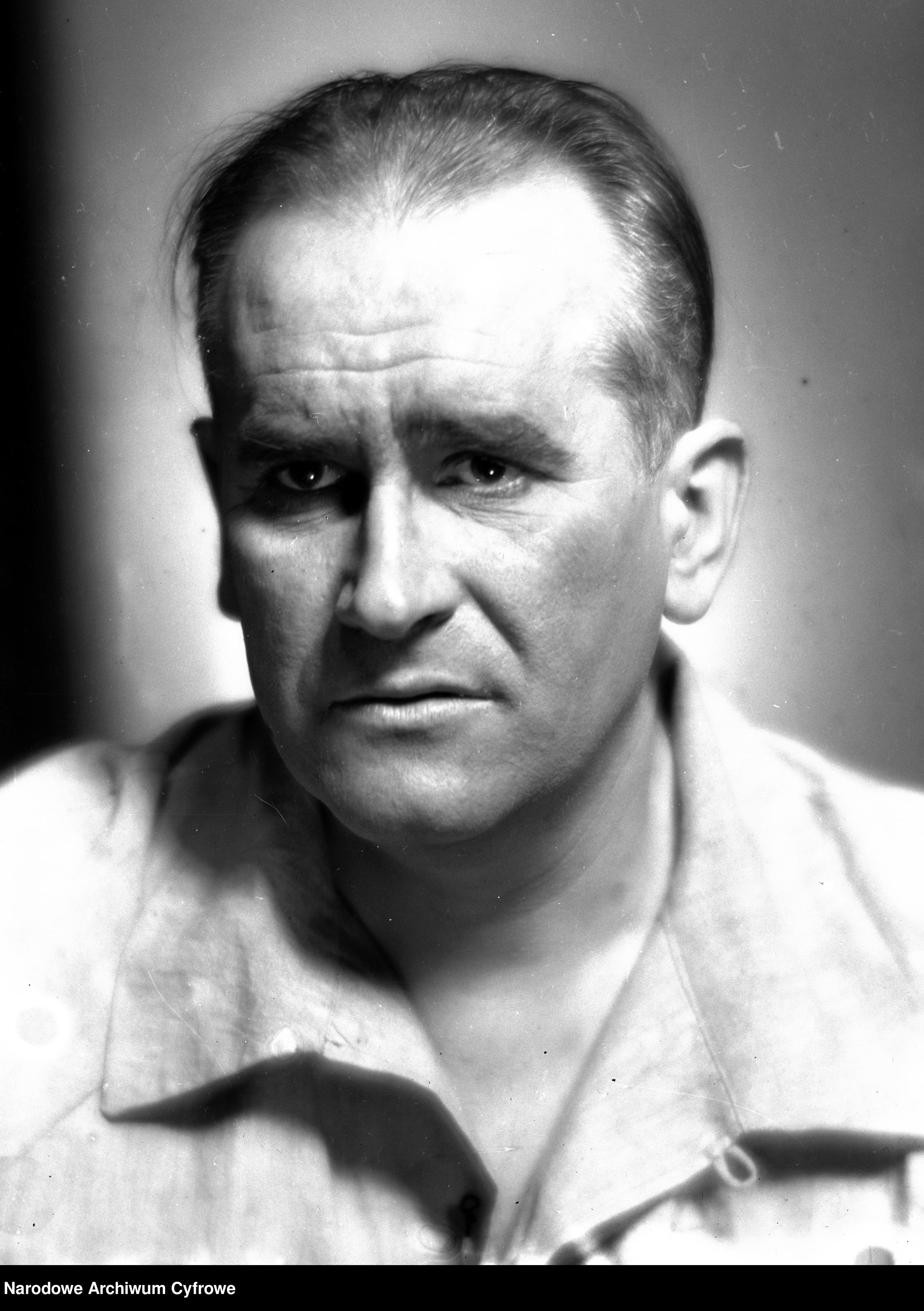
- Bąk in 1959 for Lato siedemnastej lalki
- Born: 2 January 1923; Krasnystaw, Poland
- Died: 29 August 1987 (aged 64); Skolimów, Poland
- Occupation: Actor
- Years active: 1952–1980

Henryk Bąk (2 January 1923 – 29 August 1987) was a Polish actor. He appeared in more than 50 films and television shows between 1952 and 1980.

== Selected filmography ==
- Eroica (1958)
- Bad Luck (1960)
- Milczące ślady (1961)
- Kwiecień (1961)
- Zacne grzechy (1963)
- Barrier (1966)
