= Witold Skaruch =

Polish character actor and director

Witold Skaruch (11 January 1930 – 17 February 2010) was a Polish character actor and director. He appeared in films, television shows and miniseries from 1953 until 2009.

Skaruch, who was born in Ciechanów, Poland, began his professional acting career as a journalist on Trzy starty in 1953. His career continued until in 2009. Skaruch's notable film roles included 1962's How to Be Loved, the 1963 film New Year's Romance, Pan Pan Michael in 1969, and Fears, which was released in 1979. He received a Best Actor nomination during the 2008–2009 Polish award season. His last appearance on screen was a television episode of Siostry called Ojciec Mateusz in 2009.

Witold Skaruch died in Konstancin-Jeziorna, Poland, on 17 February 2010.

== Selected filmography ==
- Milczące ślady (1961)
