= Chukhray =

Chukhray (Russian: Чухра́й) is a Russian surname. Notable people with this surname include:

- Grigory Chukhray (1921–2001), Soviet film director and screenwriter
- Pavel Chukhray (born 1946), Russian screenwriter and film director
- Sergei Chukhray (born 1955), Soviet canoeist
