= Jazz Forum (magazine) =

Polish jazz magazine

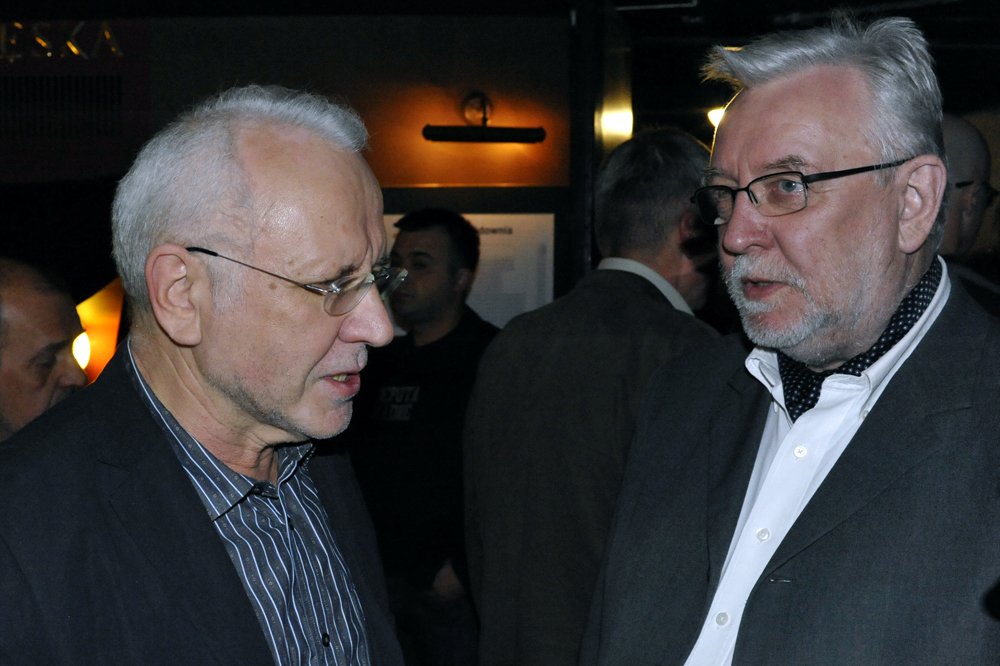
- November 2010 Editor Paul Brodowski (left) with Jerzy Stępień
- Editor-in-chief: Pawel Brodowski
- Former editors: Jan A. Byrczek
- Categories: Music magazine
- Frequency: 8/year
- Total circulation: 8,000 (2012)
- First issue: 1964
- Country: Poland
- Based in: Warsaw
- Language: Polish
- Website: jazzforum.com.pl
- ISSN: 0021-5635
- OCLC: 4061504

Jazz Forum is a European jazz magazine based in Warsaw. It was established as a quarterly in 1964 by jazz bassist Jan A. Byrczek, who served as its editor-in-chief. It was the first jazz magazine published behind the Iron Curtain and allowed Polish culture, under a communist regime, to reach out to the West. In the opinion of Willis Conover, Jazz is "the music of freedom;" and to those who had no freedom, it became a metaphor of hope. At its peak, in the late 1970s, Jazz Forum was being published in Polish, English, and German and distributed to 103 countries.

Pawel Brodowski is the current editor-in-chief. Jazz Forum is published 8 times a year and, as of 2012, circulation is approximately 8,000. The first publication was in Polish only. It was published in English from 1967 to 1992 and in German from 1976 to 1981. Around 1969, Jazz Forum became the official publication of the European Jazz Federation. In 1970, the magazine had contributing correspondents from Austria, Belgium, Czechoslovakia, Finland, France, German Democratic Republic (East Germany), Federal Republic of Germany (West Germany), Great Britain, Hungary, Norway, Romania, Spain, Switzerland, and Yugoslavia. In 1970, it was distributed by B.K.W.Z. (Ruch) from Warsaw and Buch Hansa from Hamburg. Jazz Forum is currently distributed by Empik and has received funding from the International Music Council.

Wolfram Knauer (de) called Jazz Forum one of the most important jazz publications of the 1970s and 1980s.
