= Janina Niedźwiecka =

Polish film editor (1922–2004)

- Born: 20 January 1922; Irkutsk
- Died: 17 December 2004 (aged 82); Łódź
- Occupation: Film editor

Janina Niedźwiecka (20 January 1922 – 17 December 2004) was a Polish film editor.

== Biography ==
Niedźwiecka edited films such as Palace and Journey to Arabia (both awarded for editing at the Gdynia Film Festival in 1980). She was the winner of the Chairman of the Committee of Radio and Television degree in 1975 for editing for the series Nights and Days.

== Filmography ==
- Unvanquished City (1950)
- Ewa chce spać (1957)
- Lotna (1959)
- Do widzenia, do jutra (1960)
- Historia żółtej ciżemki (1961)
- Czas przeszły (1961)
- Sublokator (1966)

Source.
