= Milczące ślady =

1961 film

- Directed by: Zbigniew Kuźmiński
- Written by: Marian Kozlowski
- Starring: Lech Wojciechowski
- Edited by: Alina Faflik
- Release date: 19 September 1960
- Running time: 83 minutes
- Country: Poland
- Language: Polish

Milczące ślady is a 1960 Polish drama film directed by Zbigniew Kuźmiński.

== Cast ==
- Lech Wojciechowski as Kolacz
- Witold Skaruch as Professor
- Ryszard Kotys as Stusina
- Włodzimierz Skoczylas as Driver Szelongiewicz
- Irena Laskowska as Walczak's wife
- Henryk Bąk as Mjr. Zimny
- Zbigniew Dobrzyński as Ens. Klos
- Kazimierz Fabisiak as Pharmacist Stanislaw Walczak
- Eugeniusz Fulde
- August Kowalczyk as Thunder
- Adam Mularczyk as Waclaw Szyndzielorz
- Witold Pyrkosz as Józef Swider
