= Tadeusz Schmidt =

Polish actor

- Born: 14 November 1920; Kraków, Poland
- Died: 10 May 1976 (aged 55); Łódź, Poland
- Occupation: Actor
- Years active: 1942-1976

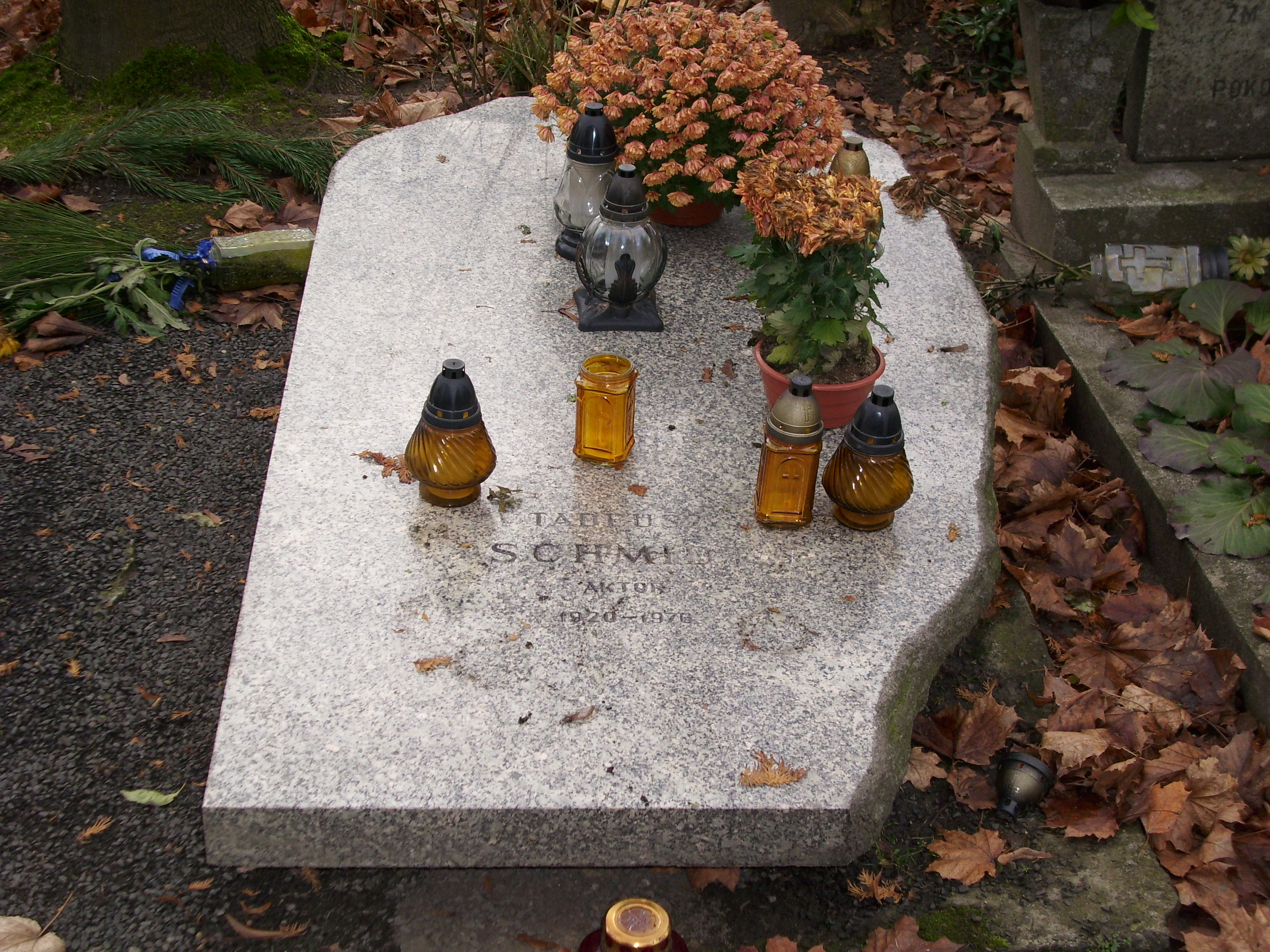
Grave of Tadeusz Schmidt at the Doły Cemetery in Łódź

Tadeusz Schmidt (14 November 1920 – 10 May 1976) was a Polish film actor. He appeared in more than 40 films between 1942 and 1976.

== Selected filmography ==
- The Two Who Stole the Moon (1962)
- Potem nastąpi cisza (1965)
- Westerplatte (1967)
- Stawka większa niż życie (1967)
- Colonel Wolodyjowski (1969)
- Boleslaw Smialy (1972)
