= Wanda Warska =

Polish jazz singer and composer (1930–2019)

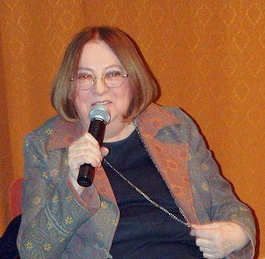
- Warska in 2006

Background information
- Birth name: Wanda Małolepsza
- Born: 28 April 1930; Poznań, Poznań Voivodeship, Poland
- Died: 6 July 2019 (aged 89); Laski, Warsaw West County, Poland
- Genres: Jazz
- Occupations: Singer; composer
- Instrument: Vocals
- Spouse: Andrzej Kurylewicz

Wanda Małolepsza (28 April 1930 – 6 July 2019), known professionally as Wanda Warska, was a Polish jazz singer and composer who worked with her husband Andrzej Kurylewicz and was nicknamed the "First Lady of Polish Jazz".

== Biography ==
=== Early life and career ===
Wanda Warska was born Wanda Małolepsza on 28 April 1930 in Poznań, Poznań Voivodeship, Poland. After singing at the Ignacy Jan Paderewski Academy of Music in Poznań at the age of five, Warska studied piano as a young child and was educated at a music and ballet school and in the Faculty of Philosophy of the University of Warsaw.

She and her husband Andrzej Kurylewicz started working together in the 1950s, performing for the latter's bands for her first recording, the 1956 Sopot Jazz Festival, and the Jazz Jamboree, and serving as his repertoire's primary performer. She was the vocalist of Kurylewicz's Organ Sextet, and her 1971 album Muzyka teatralna i telewizyjna was a collaboration with him and Czesław Niemen. Zofia Komedowa, a manager commercially involved with Kurylewicz at the time, conceived Warska's pseudonym. She was a performer of sung poetry and also performed her own lyrics. She also worked in cinema, providing vocals for Night Train (1959) and Cyrograf Dojrzałości (1967) and being the composer for Jan Batory's films Jezioro osobliwości and Karino. She made live appearances not only in Europe, but also in Cuba and Venezuela.

She also performed at Piwnica pod Baranami (a cabaret in Kraków), where she sang poetry from other poets (particularly Bolesław Leśmian, Cyprian Kamil Norwid, Agnieszka Osiecka, Juliusz Słowacki, and Julian Tuwim) and even wrote her own music and lyrics. In his book Historii jazzu w Polsce, Krystian Brodacki said that, as part of the carabet, "she was jazz's first swallow." In 1964, she and Kurylewicz, after Piwnica pod Baranami banned them, opened a nightclub in Warsaw (where they had moved a year earlier), Piwnica Wandy Warskiej. She turned to arts patronage in the 1970s, and the place later became an art gallery in 1985 and was renamed the Piwnica Artystyczna Kurylewiczów in 1987.

=== Later life and death ===
In 2000, she was awarded the Officer's Cross of the Order of Polonia Restituta. She also received the Officer's Cross of the Order of Merit of the Federal Republic of Germany. Her 2005 album Piosenki z piwnicy Wandy Warskiej was a ZPAV platinum album. In 2011, Warska was awarded the Gold Medal for Merit to Culture – Gloria Artis for "her contribution to Polish culture". Polskie Radio described her 2016 album Domowe piosenki, composed of her recordings from over the past six centuries, as a "phonographic rarity", noting that her work rarely appeared on albums.

In April 2016, Warska was incapacitated by a paralyzing stroke. In December 2018, a memorial concert named "Mount Jazz" was held in Warska's honour, with performances by such musicians as Grażyna Auguścik, Krzesimir Dębski, Urszula Dudziak, and Zbigniew Namysłowski and a poster designed by Andrzej Pągowski. However, the concert was made without the involvement of her daughter Gabriela Kurylewicz, who turned down the concert's profits, and none of Warska's compositions (or those of his husband) were performed due to concerns about offense towards the younger Kurylewicz. She won the 2020 Fryderyk in Jazz Music, which her daughter accepted on her behalf while she was recovering. In addition to her painting hobby, she became involved in sketching after recovering from her stroke.

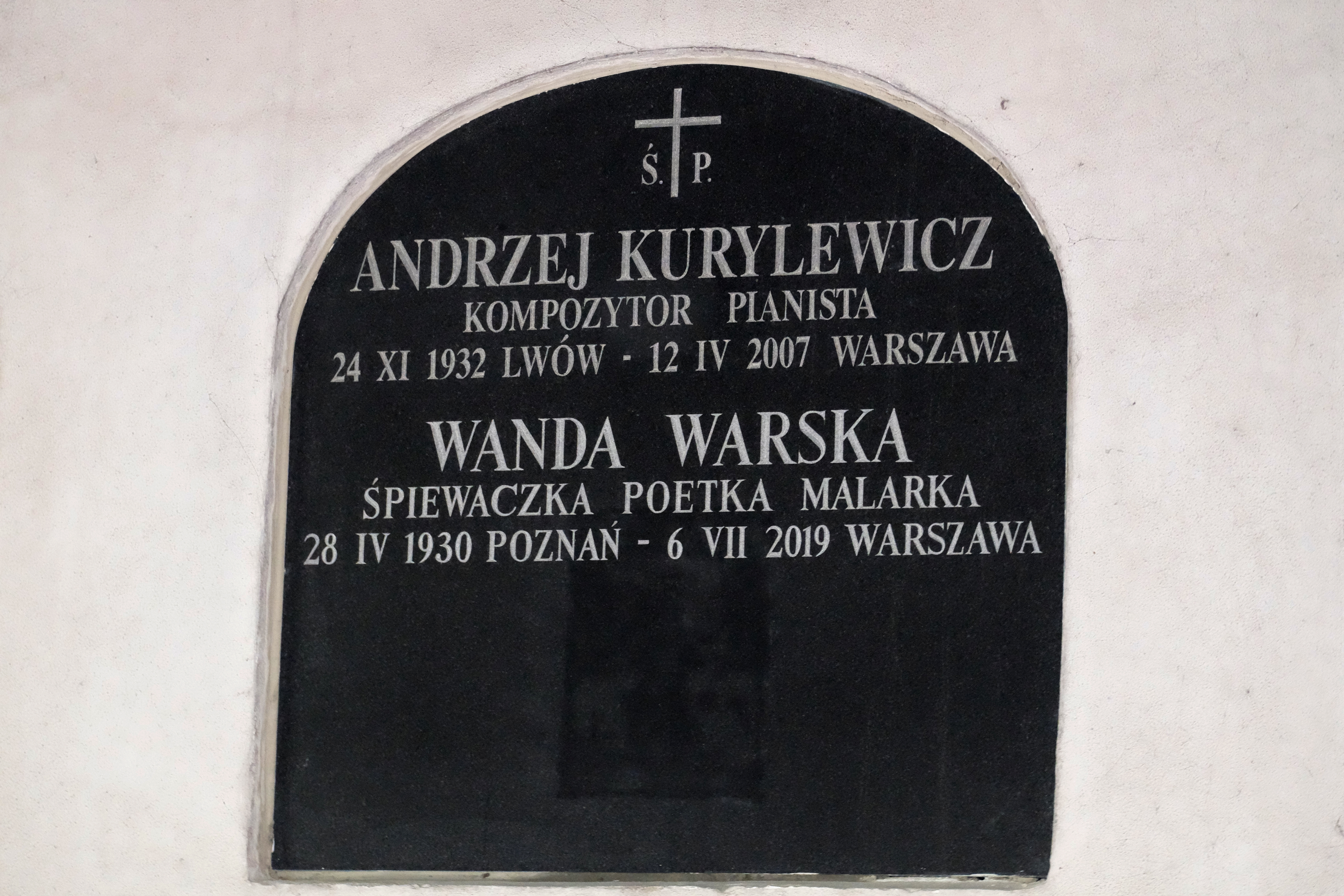
Warska and Andrzej Kurylewicz's joint grave at the Powązki Cemetery catacombs

Warska died on 6 July 2019 in Laski, Warsaw West County, aged 89. Her state funeral took place on 11 July 2019 in Laski, where Wanda Zwinogrodzka, the Undersecretary of the Ministry of Culture and National Heritage, read a letter from Deputy Prime Minister Piotr Gliński. In the letter, Gliński described Warska as a "great lady of Polish jazz" and "one of the great figures of Polish culture based on the implementation of the idea of beauty in all its forms." Warska was cremated and interred at the Powązki Cemetery.

Warska is nicknamed the "First Lady of Polish Jazz". Muzeum Jazzu described her as "a legend, an icon of poetic song and jazz, [and] an uncompromising animator of countless artistic projects", and also credited her with "introducing the Brazilian bossa nova to Poland".

== Discography ==
- Muzyka teatralna i telewizyjna (1971)
- Piosenki z piwnicy Wandy Warskiej (2005)
- Domowe piosenki (2016)
