= Barbara Sołtysik =

Polish actress (born 1942)

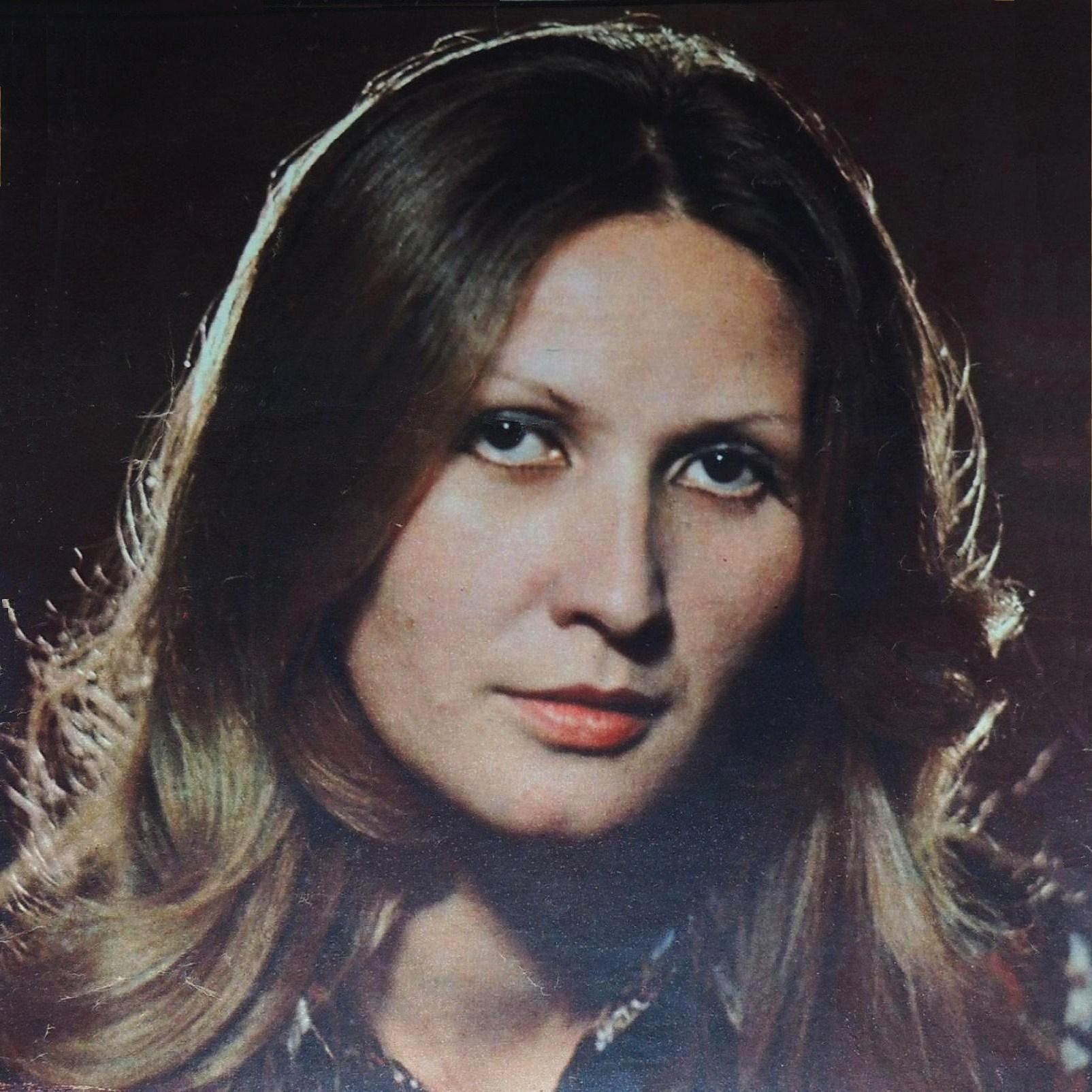
- Barbara Sołtysik in 1972
- Born: 5 August 1942 (age 83); Wadowice, Poland
- Occupation: Actress
- Years active: 1962–2006

Barbara Sołtysik (born 5 August 1942) is a Polish actress. She appeared in more than 35 films and television shows between 1962 and 2006.

== Selected filmography ==
- Potem nastąpi cisza (1965)
- Family Life (1971)
