= Janusz Majewski (director) =

Polish film director (1931–2024)

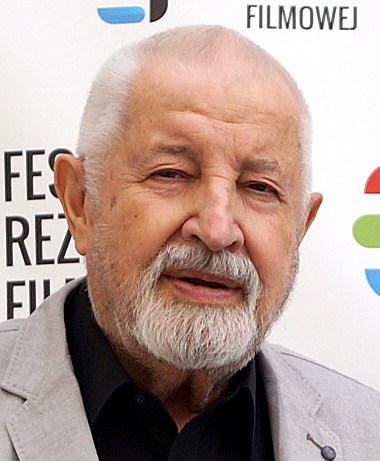
- Majewski in 2018
- Born: Janusz Marian Majewski; 5 August 1931; Lwów, Poland (now Lviv, Ukraine)
- Died: 10 January 2024 (aged 92); Warsaw
- Occupations: Film director, screenwriter
- Years active: 1957–2024
- Spouse: Zofia Nasierowska

Janusz Marian Majewski (5 August 1931 – 10 January 2024) was a Polish film director and screenwriter.

== Biography ==
Majewski married Zofia Nasierowska, who was a noted portrait photographer. He died on 10 January 2024, at the age of 92.

== Partial filmography ==
Majewski directed more than 40 films beginning in 1957.

- 1962: Szpital (Awarded at the Tours Film Festival, 1963)
- 1966: Sublokator (Winner of the FIPRESCI Prize at the International Filmfestival Mannheim-Heidelberg)
- 1970: Lokis (Winner of the Grand Prix at the 14th International Festival of Science Fiction and Horror Films, Sitges, Spain.)
- 1972: System (Award for Best Short Film at the 1972 Catalonian International Film Festival)
- 1975: Zaklęte rewiry (Entered into the 26th Berlin International Film Festival)
- 1986: C.K. Dezerterzy
- 1998: Złoto dezerterów
- 2010: Mala matura 1947 (Winner of the Special Jury Prize at the Polish Film Festival)
- 2015: Excentrycy, czyli po slonecznej stronie ulicy (Winner of the Silver Lion for Best Feature Film at the Polish Film Festival)
