= Kazimierz Fabisiak =

Polish actor, director, theatre, and theatre director

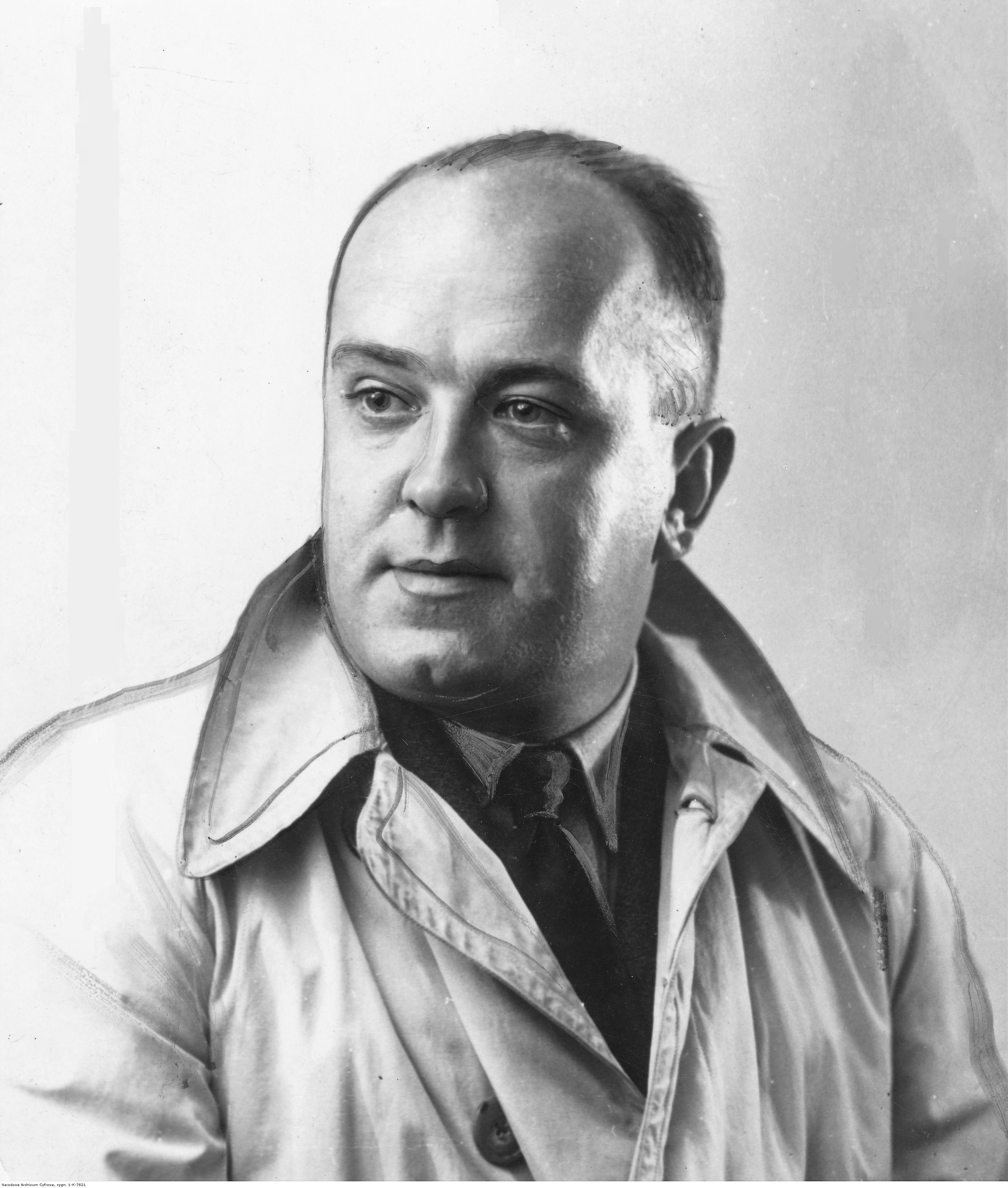
Kazimierz Fabisiak (1935)

Kazimierz Fabisiak (11 February 1903, Warsaw – 28 April 1971, Kraków) was a Polish actor, director, theatre, and theatre director.

== Partial filmography ==
- Nikodem Dyzma (1956) - Leon Kunicki
- Czlowiek na torze (1957) - Konarski
- Zimowy zmierzch (1957)
- Ziemia (1957) - Priest
- Pozegnanie z diablem (1957) - Glocerek, lawyer
- Skarb kapitana Martensa (1957) - Dominik
- Deszczowy lipiec (1958) - Holiday-Maker
- Historia jednego mysliwca (1958) - Francois, photographer
- Pozegnania (1958) - Man at the Bar
- Noc poslubna (1959) - Hanka's Father
- Miejsce na ziemi (1960) - Edmund
- Historia wspólczesna (1961) - Dispatcher Jagoda
- Mother Joan of the Angels (1961) - Father Brym
- Milczące ślady (1961) - Pharmacist Stanislaw Walczak
- Dwaj panowie 'N' (1962) - Waclaw Kaczmarek
- Drugi brzeg (1962) - straznik wiezienny Gadek
- Glos z tamtego swiata (1962) - Foreman (uncredited)
- Pamietnik pani Hanki (1963) - Dziedzic
- Milczenie (1963) - Proboszcz
- Mój drugi ozenek (1964) - Franek
- Echo (1964)
- Panienka z okienka (1964) - Johannes Szulc
- Goraca linia (1965) - Larysz
- Potem nastąpi cisza (1965) - Zosia's Father
- Pieklo i niebo (1966) - Old Devil
- Sciana czarownic (1967) - Wierszycki
- Jak rozpetalem druga wojne swiatowa (1970) - Father Dominik
- Album polski (1970) - Archaeology Professor
- Pierscien ksieznej Anny (1971) - ksiadz Kaleb
- Slonce wschodzi raz na dzien (1972) - Priest Paterek (uncredited)
