= Jerzy Kryszak =

Polish actor (born 1950)

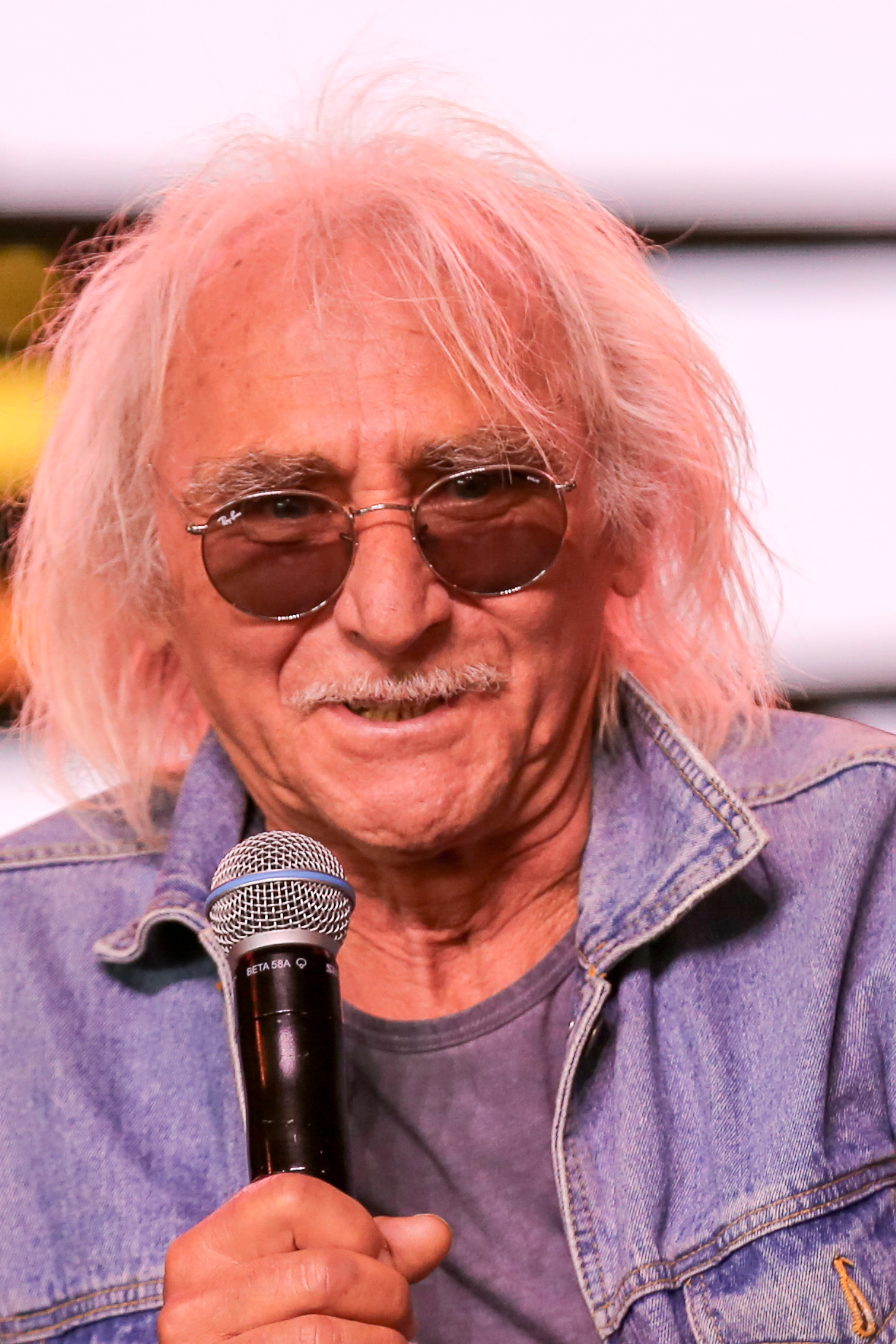
- At the Pol'and'Rock Festival 2023
- Born: 24 April 1950 (age 76); Kalisz, Poland
- Education: AST National Academy of Theatre Arts in Kraków
- Occupation: actor
- Years active: 1974–present
- Website: jerzykryszak.com

Jerzy Kryszak (born 24 April 1950) is a Polish actor.

== Career ==
He graduated Ludwik Solski Academy for the Dramatic Arts in Kraków in 1974, and debuted on stage that year. He acted at the Juliusz Słowacki Theatre in Kraków (1974–1978) and at the Ateneum Theatre in Warsaw (1978–1993). Apart from appearing in films, TV miniseries and television dramas, he gained popularity thanks to numerous satirical TV shows by Telewizja Polska (notably Polskie Zoo) and he also directed some of them. In the mid-1990s he also became a satirist performing stand-up comedy specializing in political commentary (with elements of parody), touring Poland and Polonia centers in the United States, Canada, Australia, Germany, Sweden and Austria. His performances were televised by TVP, Polsat and TV4, and he has also appeared in shows produced by HBO Comedy (Poland).

== Selected filmography ==
- Wodzirej (1977)
- Aktorzy prowincjonalni (1978)
- Dolina Issy (1982)
- Thais (1983)
- Podróże Pana Kleksa (1985)
- Żelazną ręką (1989)

=== TV series ===
- Alternatywy 4 (1983)
- Tulipan (1986)
- Kanclerz (1989)
- Marie Curie: Une femme honorable (1990)
- Dylematu 5 (2007)
- Synowie (2009)

Polish dubbing in several animated films.
