= Teresa Lipowska =

Polish actress (born 1937)

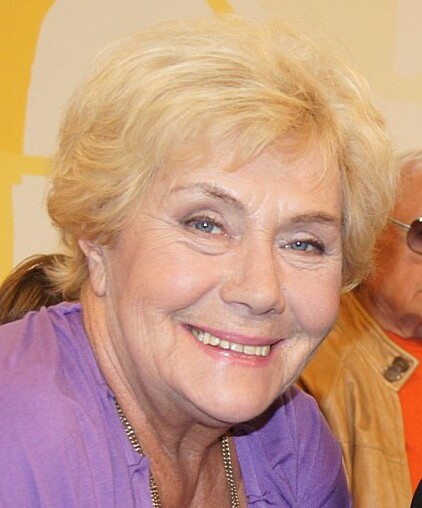
- Born: 14 July 1937 (age 88); Warsaw, Poland
- Years active: 1950 – present

Teresa Lipowska (born 14 July 1937 in Warsaw) is a Polish actress. She is best known as Barbara Mostowiak in the very popular Polish soap opera M jak miłość. Lipowska was married to actor Tomasz Zaliwski.

== Biography ==
She is the eldest daughter of officials, Maria née Niegowska and Eugeniusz Wittczak. She spent the first years of her life in Warsaw, and after the war she moved to Lodz with her family. She grew up with two younger siblings, sister Elżbieta (1941–1990) and brother Andrzej (born 1945).

As a child, she started learning to play the piano, she also played in school performances and recited poems, and at the age of nine she made her theater debut, playing a frog princess in the play Behind the Seven Mountains staged at the Lutnia Theater in Łódź. At the age of 13, she made her screen debut as an extra in Leonard Buczkowski's First Start.

== Credits ==
- 2003: Emil Karewicz. Portret aktora
- 2000–2001: Miasteczko – Grandma Ola's Friend
- 2000–today: M jak miłość – Barbara Mostowiak
- 1998: Matki, żony i kochanki II – Stefania Pawelec
- 1998: Gosia i Małgosia – Mother Gosia
- 1998: Pułkownik Bunkier (Colonel Bunker) – mother
- 1998–2003: Miodowe lata – Mr Halska (2003)
- 1997–2006: Klan – mgr Helena Frączak
- 1997–1998: 13. posterunek – Mr Lucynka
- 1997: Sara – saleslady
- 1997: Przystań – mother
- 1995: Matki, żony i kochanki – Stefania Pawelec
- 1995: Tato – Michał's mother-in-law
- 1993: Kraj świata – women
- 1993–1994: Zespół adwokacki – Maria Malak, Henryk's mother (1993)
- 1993: Czterdziestolatek. 20 lat później – Kiki's mother
- 1991–1993: Kuchnia polska
- 1989: Czarny wąwóz – Ludwika
- 1988–1991: W labiryncie – nurse
- 1988: Przeprawa
- 1988: Zakole
- 1987: Ballada o Januszku
- 1986: A żyć trzeba dalej
- 1985: Dłużnicy śmierci
- 1984: Alabama – Bożena's mother
- 1984: Pan na Żuławach
- 1983: Podróż nad morze
- 1983: Marynia – Bigielowa
- 1983: Katastrofa w Gibraltarze – Helena Sikorska
- 1983: Pastorale Heroica – Chudzina
- 1982–1986: Blisko, coraz bliżej – Teresa
- 1981: Kto ty jesteś – Halina
- 1981: Uczennica – Jadwiga Hinelowa, Anna's mother
- 1980–2000: Dom
- 1980: Dziewczyna i chłopak
- 1980: Tylko Kaśka – teacher Piotrowska
- 1979: Placówka – Jagna
- 1979: Klucznik – klucznik's wife
- 1978: W biegu
- 1978: Pogrzeb świerszcza – Broniewiczowa
- 1978: Ty pójdziesz górą - Eliza Orzeszkowa – Konopnicka Maria
- 1978: Wśród nocnej ciszy – Helena, Wańko's wife
- 1978: Rodzina Połanieckich
- 1978: Ślad na ziemi
- 1977: Dziewczyna i chłopak
- 1977: Lalka – Szperlingowa
- 1977: Noce i dnie – Stacha Łuczakówna
- 1976: Zezem
- 1976: Polskie drogi
- 1975: Obrazki z życia – Bożena's mother
- 1975: Noce i dnie – Stacha Łuczakówna
- 1975: Hazardziści – Budziak's wife
- 1975: Dyrektorzy – Szymanek's sister
- 1974: Linia – Elżbieta
- 1973: Stawiam na Tolka Banana
- 1973: Znak – Wife
- 1973: Profesor na drodze – Helena Grzegorkowa
- 1973: Bułeczka – Karol's mother
- 1972: Ogłoszenie matrymonialne
- 1971: Przystań – Żeberkiewiczowa
- 1971: Złote koło - Elżbieta Zalewska
- 1970: Przygody psa Cywila – teacher
- 1969: Rzeczpospolita babska – Danuta Pawlak
- 1968: Wniebowstąpienie
- 1968: Hasło Korn – Krystyna Kacperska
- 1966: Sublokator – Fredzia Kwaśniewska
- 1965: Wizyta u królów
- 1965: Sam pośród miasta – Paweł's wife
- 1965: Piwo
- 1964: Barbara i Jan
- 1962: Spóźnieni przechodnie –
- 1956: Szkice węglem –
- 1956: Nikodem Dyzma – women
- 1950: Pierwszy start – Junaczka

=== Prizes ===
- Polish television awards “Teleekrany 2004” in the category Best Actress.
