= Szpital =

- Village
- Location within Poland
- Coordinates: 52°49′17″N 18°26′50″E
- Country: Poland
- Voivodeship: Kuyavian-Pomeranian
- County: Inowrocław
- Gmina: Gniewkowo
- Population: 166

Szpital (German: Schöngrund) is a village in Inowrocław County, Kuyavian-Pomeranian Voivodeship, in north-central Poland.
