= Barbara Rachwalska =

Polish actress (1922–1993)

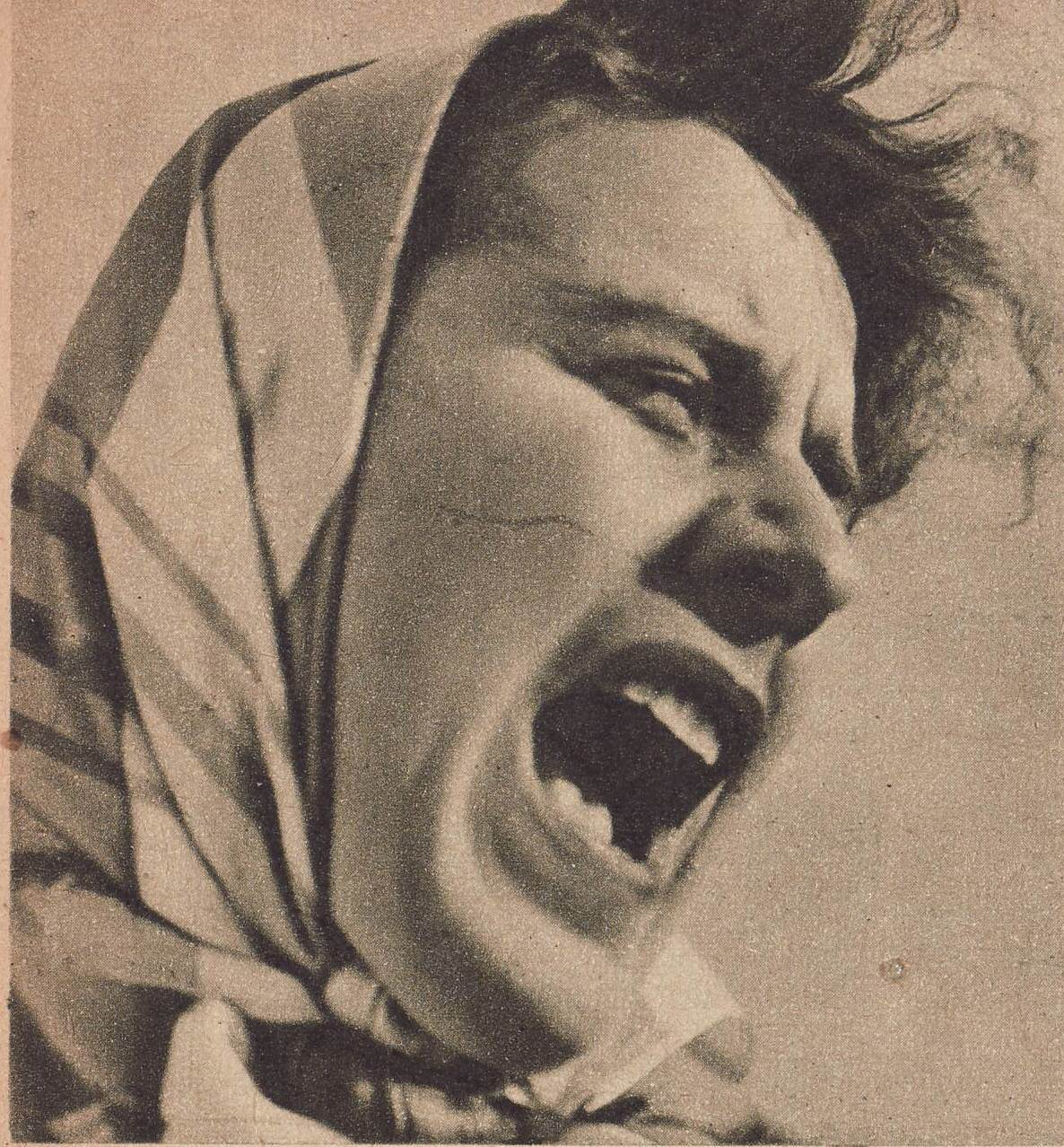
- Rachwalska in The Last Stage
- Born: 13 April 1922; Warsaw, Poland
- Died: 23 December 1993 (aged 71); Warsaw, Poland
- Occupation: Actress

Barbara Rachwalska (13 April 1922 – 23 December 1993) was a Polish stage actress, known also for a number of supporting roles in films and TV series. She cofounded the New Theatre in Łódź.

== Biography ==
Barbara Rachwalska was born on 13 April 1922, in Warsaw. During World War II, she attended underground theatre classes at the Państwowy Instytut Sztuki Teatralnej. She made her theatrical debut in 1945, in Łódź, where she later cofounded the New Theatre. In 1949–1963 and 1977–1979, she worked at the New Theatre. In the decade between she acted at the National Theatre and the Ateneum Theatre in Warsaw. She also performed in about 50 TV theatre plays. After retiring in 1979, she occasionally performed in various Warsaw theaters.

Rachwalska also played a number of supporting roles in films and TV series. Among the most popular TV characters portrayed by her was the role of Maria Talar in Dom and of Tekla Wagnerówna in Alternatywy 4.

In 1955 she was awarded the Gold Cross of Merit, then five years later she received the Knight's Cross of the Order of Polonia Restituta.

Rachwalska died on 23 December 1993, in Warsaw.

== Selected filmography ==
=== Films ===
- The Last Stage (1948)
- Żołnierz zwycięstwa (1953)
- Kazimierz Wielki (1975)
- Magnat (1987)
- Calls Controlled (1991)

=== TV series ===
- Stawka większa niż życie (1967)
- Nights and Days (1975)
- Dom (1980)
- Alternatywy 4 (1984)
