= Another Shore (1962 film) =

1962 Polish film

- Directed by: Zbigniew Kuźmiński
- Starring: Józef Nowak
- Release date: 30 April 1962
- Running time: 90 minutes
- Country: Poland
- Language: Polish

Another Shore (Polish: Drugi brzeg) is a 1962 Polish drama film directed by Zbigniew Kuźmiński.

== Plot ==
The year is 1936. Paweł, a Polish communist and active member of the Communist Party of Poland, is pursued by the police and ends up at the home of his colleague from the organization, Stefan. However, he is arrested by the police and sentenced to many years in prison. Paweł is convinced that Stefan betrayed him, as he was the only one who knew about his hiding place. However, an internal investigation by the communist organization does not confirm his suspicions, so when Paweł manages to escape from prison after Germany's attack on Poland in September 1939, he goes to Stefan again for help. Stefan welcomes him like an old friend and gives him an address to go to. Before Paweł gets there, he sees the Gestapo taking his beloved girlfriend, Ewa, away from his house. He becomes suspicious of Stefan again. When Stefan soon avoids the wave of arrests of communists at his workplace, Paweł is certain that Stefan is a traitor.

== Cast ==
- Józef Nowak
- Alicja Pawlicka
- Franciszek Pieczka
- Ludwik Pak
- Jerzy Bińczycki as Policeman
- Marian Jastrzębski
- Zdzisław Karczewski as Florian
- Halina Mikolajska as Woman with a Children
- Witold Pyrkosz as Gabrys
- August Kowalski as Judge
- Stanisław Ptak as Prisoner
- Helena Chanecka as Parolowa
