= Zbigniew Kuźmiński =

Polish screenwriter

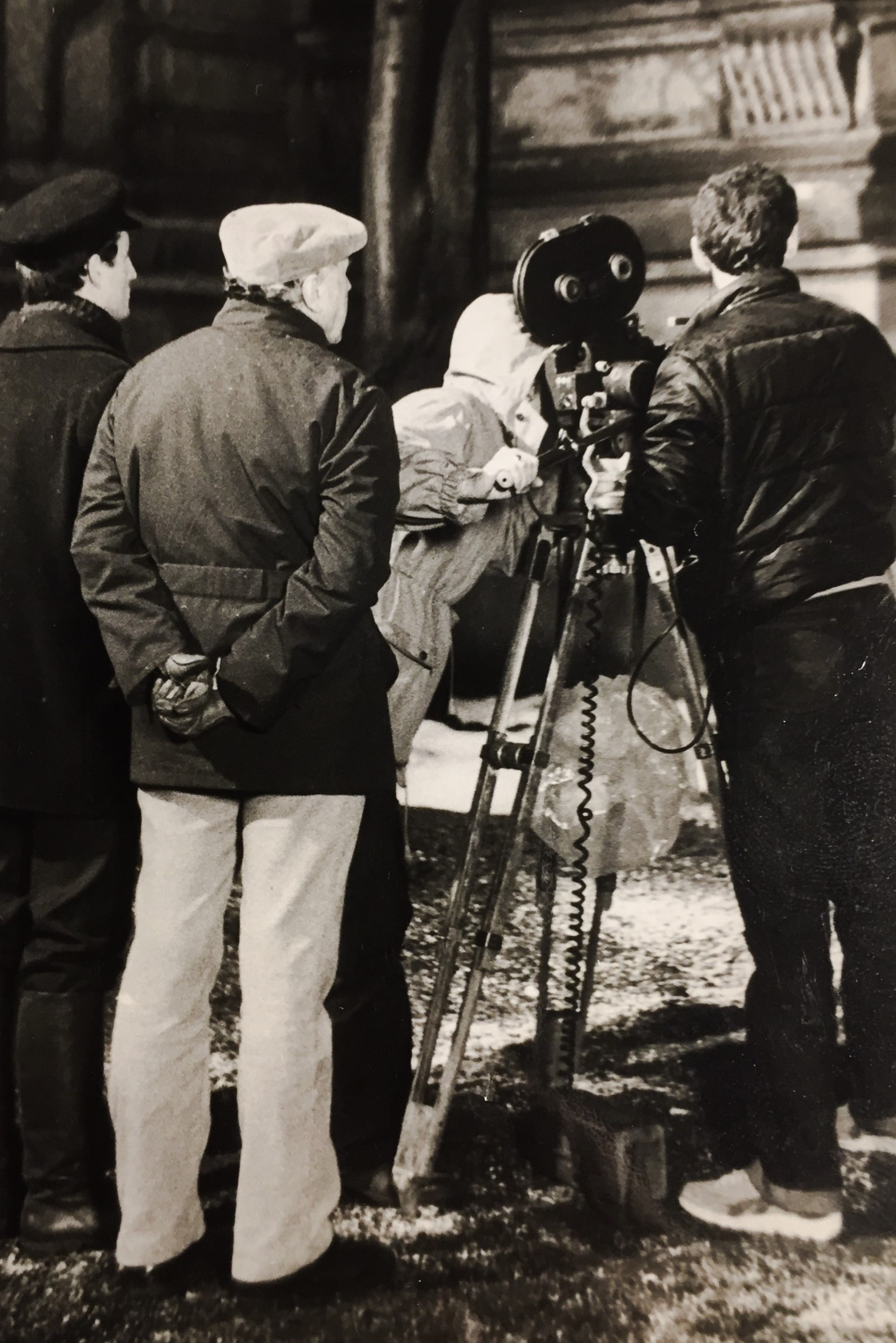
- Zbigniew Kuźmiński behind the camera with the film crew (1984)
- Born: 4 November 1921; Bydgoszcz, Poland
- Died: 12 March 2005 (aged 83); Gdansk, Poland
- Occupations: Film director Screenwriter
- Years active: 1950–1989

Zbigniew Kuźmiński (4 November 1921 – 12 March 2005) was a Polish film director and screenwriter. He was nominated for Polish Golden Lions and has received Gdynia Film Festival's Golden Talar Award in 1987, as well as many other accolades.

== Career ==
Kuźmiński began his career as an assistant director of the renowned Polish film directors, Jan Rybkowski and Aleksander Ford. Kuźmiński worked on Border Street (1948) with the director Aleksander Ford, picture which later won the Grand Prix at the 9th Venice Film Festival. He directed more than 25 feature films between 1950 and 1989.

== Selected filmography ==
- Border Street (1948) – assistant director
- Milczące ślady (1961)
- Drugi brzeg (1962)
- Desperacja (1988)
- Republika nadziei (1988)
