= Piotr Pawłowski (actor) =

Polish actor (1925–2012)

- Born: 19 August 1925; Miłosław, Poland
- Died: 27 February 2012 (aged 86); Warsaw, Poland
- Occupation: Actor
- Years active: 1958–1995

Piotr Pawłowski (19 August 1925 – 27 February 2012) was a Polish actor. He appeared in 45 films and television shows between 1958 and 1995.

== Selected filmography ==
- Kwiecień (1961)
- Pharaoh (1966)
