= Henryk Bista =

Polish actor (1934–1997)

- Born: 12 March 1934; Ruda Śląska, Kochłowice, Poland
- Died: 8 October 1997 (aged 63); Warsaw, Poland
- Education: National Higher School of Theatre (Warsaw)
- Occupation: Actor
- Years active: 1961–1997

Henryk Bista (12 March 1934 – 8 October 1997) was a Polish actor. He appeared in over 110 films between 1961 and 1997. He starred in the 1977 film Death of a President, which was entered into the 28th Berlin International Film Festival, where it won the Silver Bear for an outstanding artistic contribution. He was awarded many Polish film and state awards, including the Knight's Cross of the Order of Polonia Restituta (1984), the Gold and Silver Crosses of Merit (1976 and 1971, respectively) and the Bronze Medal of Merit for National Defence (1968).

== Selected filmography ==
- Rzeczywistość (1961) - Roman Andrzejewski
- Banda (1965)
- Pieczone gołąbki (1966) - Worker (uncredited)
- Ostatni po Bogu (1968) - Józek
- Seksolatki (1972)
- Drzwi w murze (1974) - (uncredited)
- Czerwone i białe (1975) - Karol Krauze
- To Save the City (1976) - Capt. AK 'Sztych'
- Dagny (1977) - Antoni Przybyszewski - brother
- Ptaki, ptakom... (1977) - Karol Profaska
- Death of a President (1977) - Priest Nowakowski
- Pasja (1978) - Stranger
- Do krwi ostatniej... (1978) - Priest Franciszek Kubsz
- Wsród nocnej ciszy (1978) - Stefan Waniek
- 80 huszár (1978)
- Szpital przemienienia (1979) - Dr. Kauters
- Sto koni do stu brzegów (1979)
- Sekret Enigmy (1979) - Brochwitz
- Hotel Klasy Lux (1979) - Henryk Jakubik
- Zielone lata (1980)
- Wizja lokalna 1901 (1980) - Head Teacher Fedtke
- Vabank (1981) - Jan Rozek
- The Turning Point (1983) - Polnischer Gefangener (uncredited)
- Oko proroka (1984)
- Synteza (1984) - Asteria
- Rok spokojnego slonca (1984) - (uncredited)
- Nie bylo slonca tej wiosny (1984) - Mazurek
- Kartka z podróży (1984) - Rabbi
- O-Bi, O-Ba: The End of Civilization (1985) - Chubby
- Przeklęte oko proroka (1985)
- Yesterday (1985) - Dyrector
- Przemytnicy (1985) - Old Alinczuk
- Medium (1985) - Dr. Mincel
- Podróze pana Kleksa (1986) - Wielki Elektronik
- Mokry szmal (1986) - Lason
- W cieniu nienawisci (1986)
- Ga, Ga - Chwala bohaterom (1986) - Preacher
- Sceny dziecięce z życia prowincji (1986) - Mr. M.
- Tanie pieniądze (1986) - Leon Solski 'Czeresniak'
- The Mother of Kings (1987) - Grzegorz Wiechra
- Komediantka (1987) - Doctor
- Życie wewnętrzne (1987) - Neighbour Tenodpsa
- Wierna rzeka (1987) - Dr. Kulewski
- Między ustami a brzegiem pucharu (1987) - Franz
- Łuk Erosa (1987) - Ramke
- Magnat (1987) - Gosche, Goebbels's Assistant
- Śmierć Johna L. (1988) - Kosinski
- Koniec sezonu na lody (1988) - Drabik
- On the Silver Globe (1988)
- Sonata marymoncka (1988) - Rustecki
- Schodami w górę, schodami w dół (1988) - Szmurlo
- Curse of Snakes Valley (1988) - Reporter
- Nowy Jork, czwarta rano (1988) - Traveller Seeking Miracles
- Kocham kino (1988) - Wacek Wislicki
- Pan Kleks w kosmosie (1988) - Wielki elektronik
- Meskie sprawy (1989)
- Pilkarski poker (1989) - Referee Jaskóla
- Decalogue X (1989, TV Mini-Series) - Shopkeeper
- A Tale of Adam Mickiewicz's 'Forefathers' Eve' (1989) - Senator
- Konsul (1989) - Company Manager Marian Lugowski
- Żelazną ręką (1989) - Cabas
- Ostatni dzwonek (1989) - School Director Wronacki
- Stan wewnetrzny (1989)
- Porno (1990) - Doctor
- Bal na dworcu w Koluszkach (1990) - Pszoniak - journalist
- Farewell to Autumn (1990) - Belzebub Bertz
- Historia niemoralna (1990) - Jurek
- Escape from the 'Liberty' Cinema (1990) - Janik
- Powrót wilczycy (1990) - Dr. Nussbaum
- W środku Europy (1990) - Bazarewicz
- Eminent Domain (1990)
- Smierc dziecioroba (1991) - Father of Blada
- Kanalia (1991) - Barber
- 30 Door Key (1991)
- Dziecko szczęścia (1991) - Lawyer
- Life for Life: Maximilian Kolbe (1991) - Farmer
- Odjazd (1992) - Von Litzki
- Mau Mau (1992) - Kowalik
- Kuka on Joe Louis? (1992) - Vaimoaan muisteleva mies baarissa
- Biale malzenstwo (1992)
- Verykokka sto kalathi (1992)
- Cynga (1992)
- The Little Apocalypse (1993) - Yanek
- Pora na czarownice (1993) - Jozef
- Schindler's List (1993) - Mr. Löwenstein
- Dwa księżyce (1993) - Mistig
- Reverted (1994, TV Movie) - Director Biernacki
- Zivot a neobycejna dobrodruzstvi vojaka Ivana Conkina (1994) - Zhikin
- Polska śmierć (1994) - Osso's Neighbour
- Prowokato (1995)
- Les Milles (1995) - Otto von Offenberg
- Nothing Funny (1995) - Pyrotechnist
- Mlode wilki (1995)
- Akwarium (1996)
- Taranthriller (1997) - Ojciec
- Sztos (1997)
- Kochaj i rób co chcesz (1998) - Professor Wilczewski
- Ubu król (2003)
