= Eligiusz Niewiadomski =

Polish artist (1869–1923)

Eligiusz Józef Niewiadomski
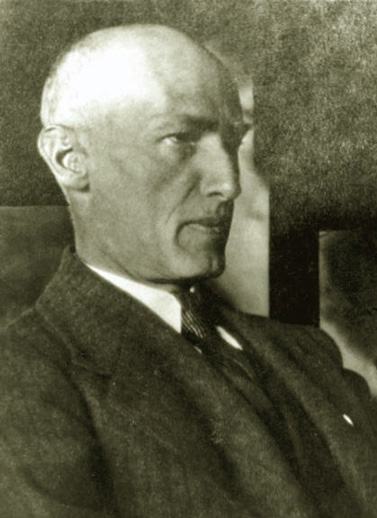
- Born: 1 December 1869; Warsaw, Congress Poland
- Died: 31 January 1923 (aged 53); Warsaw Citadel, Second Polish Republic
- Resting place: Powązki Cemetery
- Education: Imperial Academy of Arts
- Occupation: Artist
- Status: Executed by firing squad
- Conviction: Murder
- Penalty: Death

Eligiusz Józef Niewiadomski (1 December 1869 – 31 January 1923) was a Polish modernist painter and art critic who sympathized with the right-wing National Democracy movement. In 1922, he assassinated Poland's first President, Gabriel Narutowicz, in his first week in office as president.

== Life ==
Niewiadomski was born into a family of gentry descent. His father, Wincenty Niewiadomski, of the Prus coat-of-arms, was a veteran of the January Uprising and a worker at the Warsaw mint. At the age of two, Eligiusz lost his mother Julia, and was raised by his elder sister Cecylia. After graduating from a local trade school in 1888, Niewiadomski moved to St. Petersburg, where he continued his studies at the Imperial Academy of Arts. He graduated in 1894 with honors, and won a scholarship to the École Supérieure des Beaux-Arts in Paris. After his return to Warsaw, he became a student of Wojciech Gerson, one of the best-known Polish artists of the age.

After 1897, he taught drawing at the Warsaw Polytechnic. He also collaborated with a number of Warsaw-based magazines and newspapers as a journalist and art critic, which gave him considerable notoriety, mostly among the artists themselves. He became involved in various artistic movements, among them the "re-discovery" of the Tatra Mountains, which at the time attracted some of the most renowned Polish painters, poets and writers as a source of inspiration. Niewiadomski prepared and published a map of the Tatras, one of the first tourist maps of the area. He also prepared a set of historical maps of Poland, Album of the History of Poland (1899). He also became involved in the reorganization of the Zachęta art society. Using contacts acquired there, he promoted the idea of creating a separate Academy of Fine Arts in Warsaw. However, when the school was finally opened in 1903, Niewiadomski was not invited to teach there.

Politically, Niewiadomski was a strong supporter of nationalism, particularly the National League. In 1901 he was arrested by the Tsarist police for smuggling nationalist propaganda booklets from Galicia into Vistula Land. Though released after several months in the Pawiak Prison, he lost his job at Warsaw Polytechnic and fell into an impoverished state. This further radicalized his political beliefs. During the Russo-Japanese War he promoted the idea of perpetrating anti-Russian sabotage, for which he was excluded from the National League.

To make a living, Niewiadomski began teaching art classes at numerous schools and churches in Poland. He also made frescoes in Konin's St. Bartholomew's Church. However, his two-volume monograph On Mediaeval Art sold poorly, and Niewiadomski was on the verge of being forgotten by his contemporaries.

After the outbreak of World War I he remained in Warsaw, where he published brochures and manifestos describing his views on the role of art. He also continued teaching art history and artistic technique at various schools. On 1 March 1918 he was appointed director of painting and sculpture at the Regency Council's Ministry of Culture, a post that had previously been turned down by numerous artists.

After Poland regained independence, Niewiadomski joined the newly reborn country's Ministry of Culture. In 1920, during the Polish-Soviet War, he tried to join the Polish Army but was turned down as too old. However, he was accepted by Polish intelligence and served as a translator of Russian documents. During the last months of the war, he finally managed to convince his superiors to transfer him to front-line service and fought in the 5th Legions' Infantry Regiment.

Demobilized in 1921, Niewiadomski returned to the Ministry of Culture and continued his work there as a clerk. However, on 8 November 1921, after Antoni Ponikowski's government refused to grant Niewiadomski's department a higher budget, he resigned his post. He then devoted himself to writing and prepared several monographs on 19th- and 20th-century Polish painting, and on the theory of art. He made his living illustrating books.

== Assassination of Gabriel Narutowicz ==
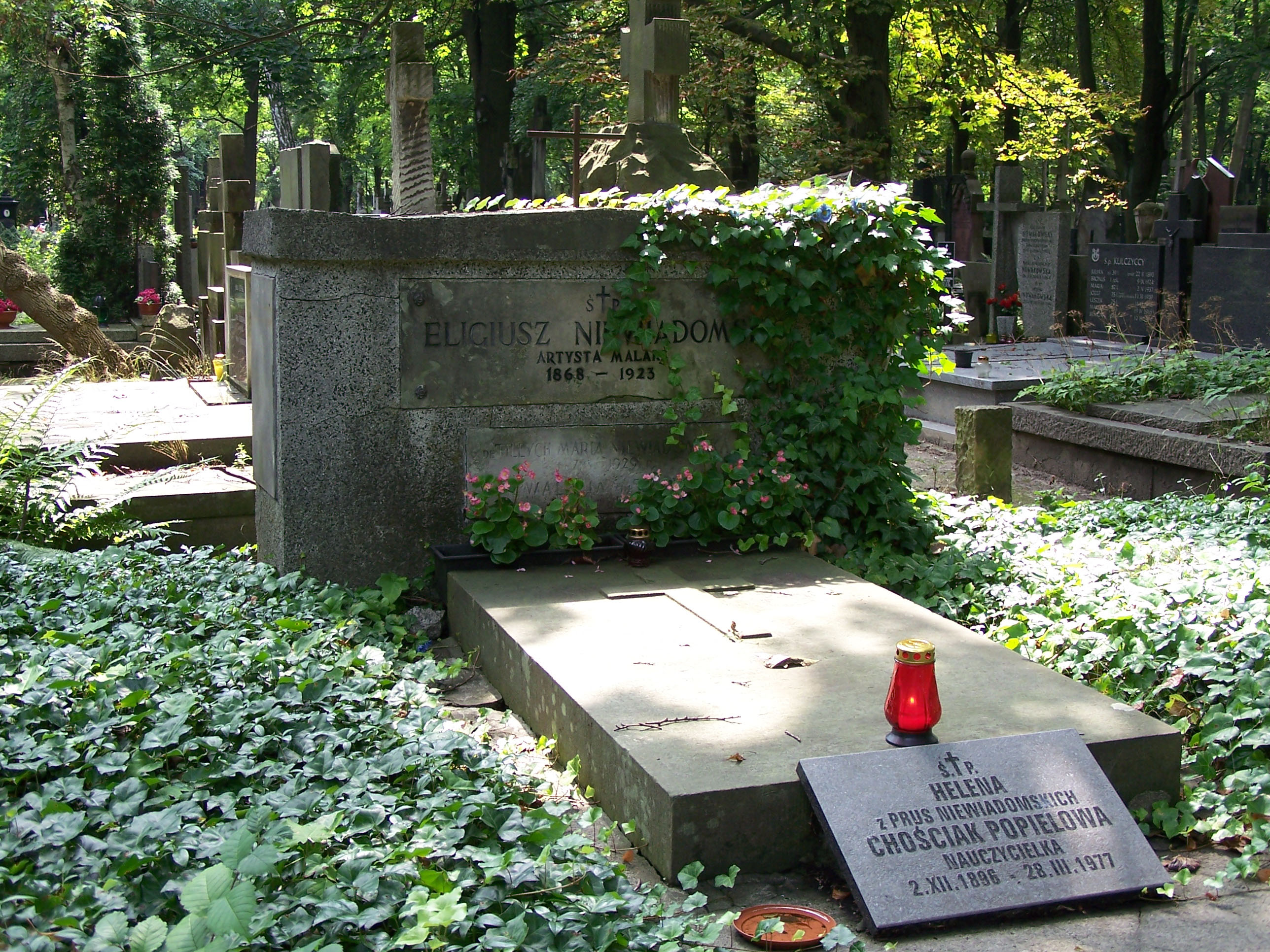
Niewiadomski's grave at Powązki Cemetery

On 9 December 1922 Gabriel Narutowicz was elected by the National Assembly as the first President of Poland. After a heated debate, Narutowicz's candidacy managed to gather 289 votes, including 113 votes of various national minority MPs. The defeated candidate of the National Democratic Party Maurycy Zamoyski gathered 227 votes, yet the National Democrats decided to boycott the President and announced that he was elected by the "Reds, Jews, and Germans" rather than Poles. This started a period of civil unrest in Warsaw, where the supporters of nationalist ideas protested against the election of their president.

On 16 December 1922 the newly elected president attended the opening of an art exhibition at the Zachęta Art Gallery. Niewiadomski, a frequent guest at such gatherings, pulled out his pistol, approached Narutowicz, and shot him. The president died instantly. Arrested on 30 December, Niewiadomski demanded a death sentence for himself and was sentenced to death by firing squad. The sentence was carried out at the Warsaw Citadel on 31 January 1923. He was 53 years old. His body was interred at Warsaw's Powązki Cemetery.

A few months after his death, a renowned psychiatrist, Maurycy Urstein, called Niewiadomski's execution a judiciary homicide, as the perpetrator was mentally ill and clinically insane but the court had disregarded the need for expert psychiatric testimony.

After his execution, Niewiadomski remained a controversial figure. His funeral was attended by 10,000 people.

== Movie ==
In 1977 director Jerzy Kawalerowicz made the film Death of a President about the assassination of Gabriel Narutowicz. The role of Narutowicz was played by Zdzisław Mrożewski, and Niewiadomski was played by Marek Walczewski.

== See also ==
- List of Poles
