= Massacre of patients at the Kobierzyn psychiatric hospital =

Murder of psychiatric patients in occupied Kraków

Massacre of patients at the Kobierzyn Psychiatric Hospital
- Location in Poland
- Location: 50.004472°N 19.884139°E; Kobierzyn, General Government (German-occupied Poland)
- Date: 1939 – 23 June 1942
- Attack type: Systematic starvation, deportation, and mass murder
- Deaths: approx. 900–1,000
- Perpetrator: Nazi Germany

The massacre of patients at the State Institute for the Mentally and Nervously Ill in Kobierzyn was the systematic murder, carried out during World War II by officials of Nazi Germany, of more than one thousand patients of the psychiatric hospital in Kobierzyn, (present-day Dr. Józef Babiński Clinical Hospital in Kraków). The chain of crimes consisted of three stages: the starvation of patients, the deportation of patients of Jewish nationality in September 1941, and the mass murder through the deceptive transport of patients to the Auschwitz concentration camp on 23 June 1942. Including the victims of starvation, approximately 900–1,000 people were killed in total. The main perpetrator, the German-appointed hospital director Alex Kroll, evaded punishment.

== Kobierzyn hospital before the war ==
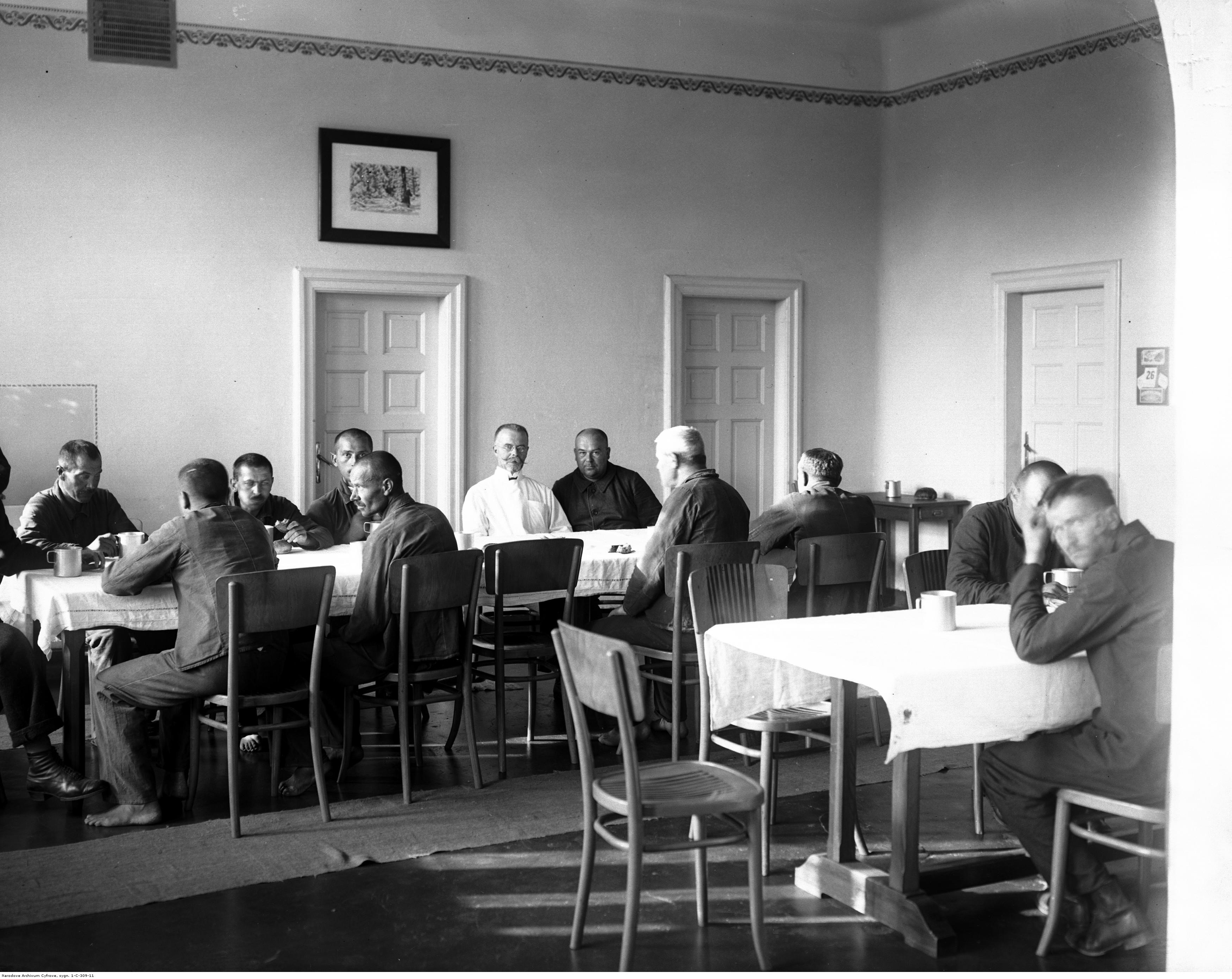
Patients in the hospital canteen, August 1927. Hospital director Juliusz Morawski is visible among them

From February 1929 until the outbreak of World War II, the institution was directed by Dr. Władysław Stryjeński – vice-president of the Chamber of Physicians and Dentists, president of the Kraków Regional Medical Chamber, and senator of the Republic of Poland in the fifth term (1938–1939). Under his leadership the hospital achieved economic self-sufficiency: it operated its own farm and garden, shop, craft workshops, and employees were allocated garden plots. The facility also maintained its own kindergarten and a works fire brigade. The outbreak of the war found Dr. Stryjeński in Warsaw. Together with members of the Polish state administration, he was evacuated to Romania. The position of chief physician was then held by Dr. Władysław Issajewicz.

== Hospital under German administration ==
=== First weeks of the occupation ===
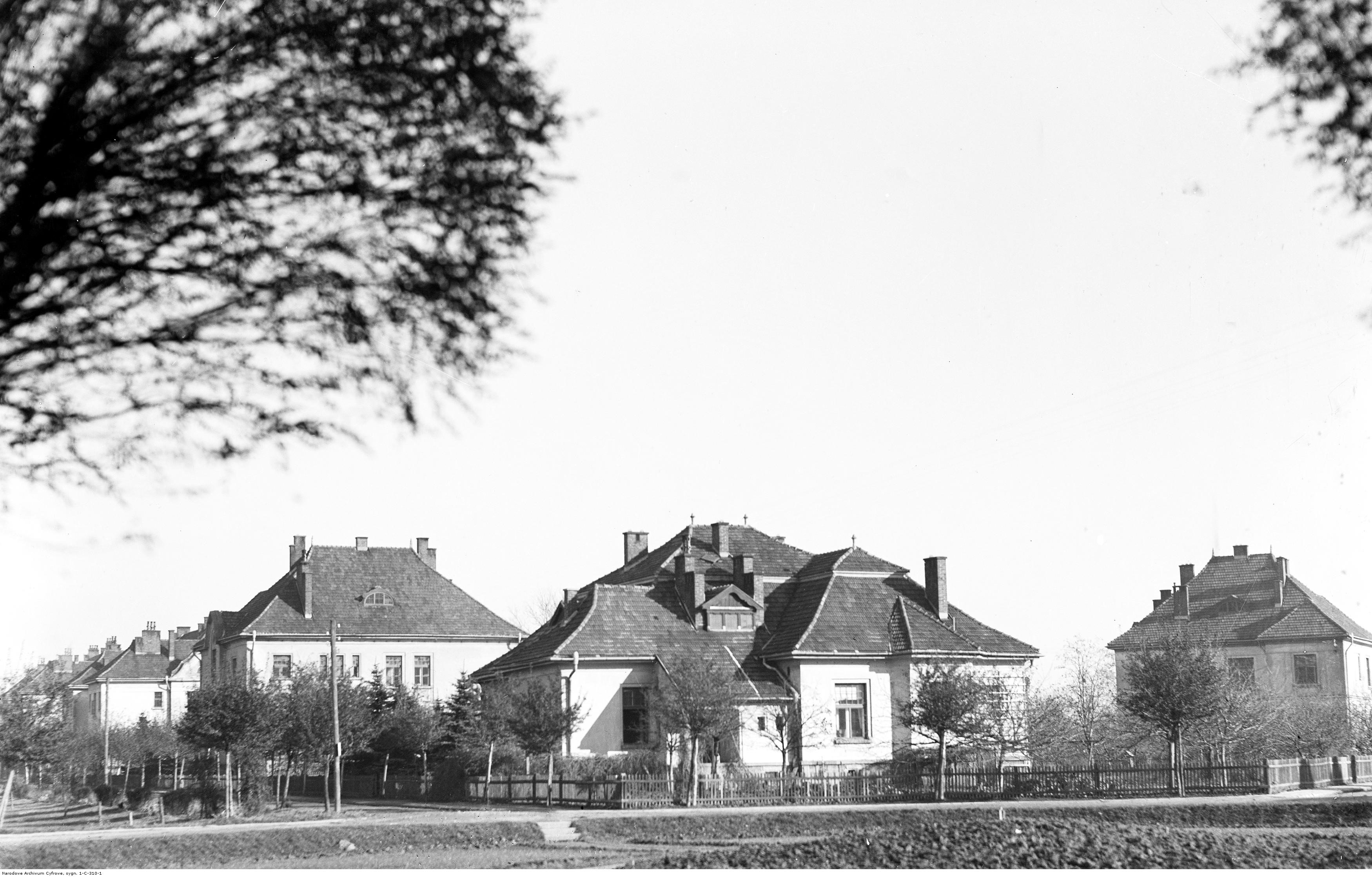
The hospital administration building, November 1931

Between 6 and 8 September 1939, a Wehrmacht unit was quartered on the premises of the hospital. Upon departing, the soldiers took with them valuable items, including typewriters, sanitary supplies, and medicines. In the initial period of the war, after the conclusion of the September Campaign, the hospital continued to function normally and housed more than 1,000 patients. Thanks to stockpiles accumulated before the war, patients' rations remained at pre-war levels.

=== November 1939 – May 1942 ===
On 20 November 1939, the German occupation authorities took control of the facility. On that day the hospital was visited by Dr. Giller, the German director of St. Lazarus Hospital in Kraków, who announced the establishment of German administration and conducted a verification of staff for "Aryan" origin, resulting in the dismissal of one physician. On 21 November 1939, Dr. Fritz Arlt was appointed managing commissioner and directed the hospital until May 1940, when he was replaced by merchant Arnold Zweck. Under Zweck's administration food reserves began to dwindle. In October 1940 he was succeeded by Nazi Party member Alex Kroll, a former official in the Warsaw District health department who had no medical qualifications.

The directorship in Kobierzyn was offered to Kroll by his superior, Jost Walbaum, head of the Health Department. Kroll had previously been Walbaum's patient. According to Kroll's later testimony, Walbaum informed him about Aktion T4 and explained that German authorities regarded the patients in Kobierzyn as "life unworthy of life".

Shortly after taking office, Kroll ordered a reduction in patients' daily food rations. Dr. Władysław Issajewicz, who served as chief physician throughout the occupation, recorded in a 1945 article that working patients received approximately 1,200 kcal per day and non-working patients 1,000 kcal. (Note: Roman Kiełkowski (a judge of the District Commission for the Investigation of German Crimes) provides slightly higher figures: 1,700 kcal for working patients and 1,200 kcal for non-working patients.) Patients of Jewish origin were given only 50% or one-third of the rations allocated to Polish patients. Food withheld from patients was stockpiled. The quality of meals deteriorated sharply; the diet consisted primarily of unpeeled boiled potatoes, potato soup, and cabbage, with 5–6 kg of fat per day for roughly 1,000 patients. By spring 1941 potatoes ran out and were replaced in soup by goosefoot and nettles. Bread rations were limited to 75–150 g per day for non-Jewish patients and 50 g for Jewish patients.

The starvation policy produced a sharp rise in mortality. In 1940 alone, 501 patients died, including 109 of Jewish origin. In September 1941, (Note: The first group of 41 people, consisting exclusively of women, departed on 8 September 1941, and the second group, comprising 50 people of both genders, departed on 11 September.) Jewish patients were transferred to the Jewish psychiatric institution Zofiówka in Otwock; only three or four terminally ill Jewish patients remained in Kobierzyn. The transport to Otwock was conducted under humane conditions: the patients received provisions, were accompanied by a physician, and were escorted by auxiliary staff. On 19 August 1942, during the liquidation of the Otwock Ghetto, all Zofiówka patients, including those transferred from Kobierzyn, were murdered, and the Jewish medical staff was sent to the Treblinka extermination camp.

In September 1941 (Note: According to Roman Kiełkowski, Axmann's visit took place in the spring of 1942.) Reichsjugendführer Artur Axmann visited Kobierzyn with the intention of converting the hospital complex for Hitler Youth purposes. Following this visit, Kroll received instructions to liquidate the institution as quickly as possible. By this time, patients' food rations had fallen to less than half the minimum physiological requirement, forcing their bodies to consume their own tissue. Rations were personally set by Kroll himself, and the reductions were not caused by any actual shortage of supplies: until the liquidation in June 1942, the hospital continued to receive its allocated quotas of flour, sugar, pasta and fat from the German authorities. As a result of starvation, patients' body weight dropped dramatically; cases were recorded in which individuals lost up to 15 kg in a single month, accompanied by rapid physical deterioration. At the turn of 1941 and 1942, monthly mortality reached 45–50 deaths. The systematic starvation clearly constituted a deliberate policy of biological extermination.

==== Mortality of patients under German administration ====
Catholic death registers maintained by the hospital chaplain, which recorded only Christian patients, show that 75 patients died between 1 September and 31 December 1939, 392 died in 1940, 355 in 1941, and 135 between 1 January and 17 June 1942. Surviving administrative records of the institution additionally confirm that 109 Jewish patients died in 1940.

==== Spring 1942 ====
Preparations for the liquidation of the hospital began in the spring of 1942. In the month preceding the action, the Kobierzyn facility was visited by numerous high-ranking SS officers. Kroll received them either in his official office or in his residence located on the hospital grounds. The visitors included SS-Oberführer Julian Scherner (SS and Police Leader in Kraków), SS-Standartenführer Max Hammer (believed to have directed the operation of 23 June 1942), SS-Sturmbannführer Karl Meyer, SS-Hauptsturmführer Krüger, SS-Obergruppenführer Friedrich-Wilhelm Krüger (Higher SS and Police Leader for the General Government), and Dr. Werner Beck, SS-Hauptscharführer and head of the Institute of Forensic Medicine in Kraków.

=== May and June 1942 ===
At the beginning of June 1942, Kroll prohibited physicians from discharging patients from the institution, citing an order from the SS command in Kraków. New admissions continued, however, with the last patient admitted on 23 June, the day of the hospital's liquidation. One week after the discharge ban was imposed (and two weeks before the liquidation), Ordnungspolizei took over guard duties at the main entrance gate. A formal inspection of the hospital cemetery was also conducted. After the war, the gravedigger Władysław Bargieł testified that Kroll visited the cemetery accompanied by a high-ranking German officer and an interpreter named Pawłyk. Bargieł was instructed to indicate an unused area for burials; he pointed to a clearing several metres east of the morgue, which also served as his residence. The German officer reportedly approved the location.

On 18 June, the Polish physicians employed at the hospital – Dr. Władysław Issajewicz, Dr. Meissner, Dr. Feliks Dębski, and medical graduates Hołda and Zicha – were ordered by Kroll to leave the facility within three days and transfer to the Drewnica institution near Warsaw. Kroll announced that German physicians would assume care of the patients and that the existing staff were to hand over patient records and ward keys. The doctors were barred from entering the wards and departed on 21 June.

==== 22 June ====
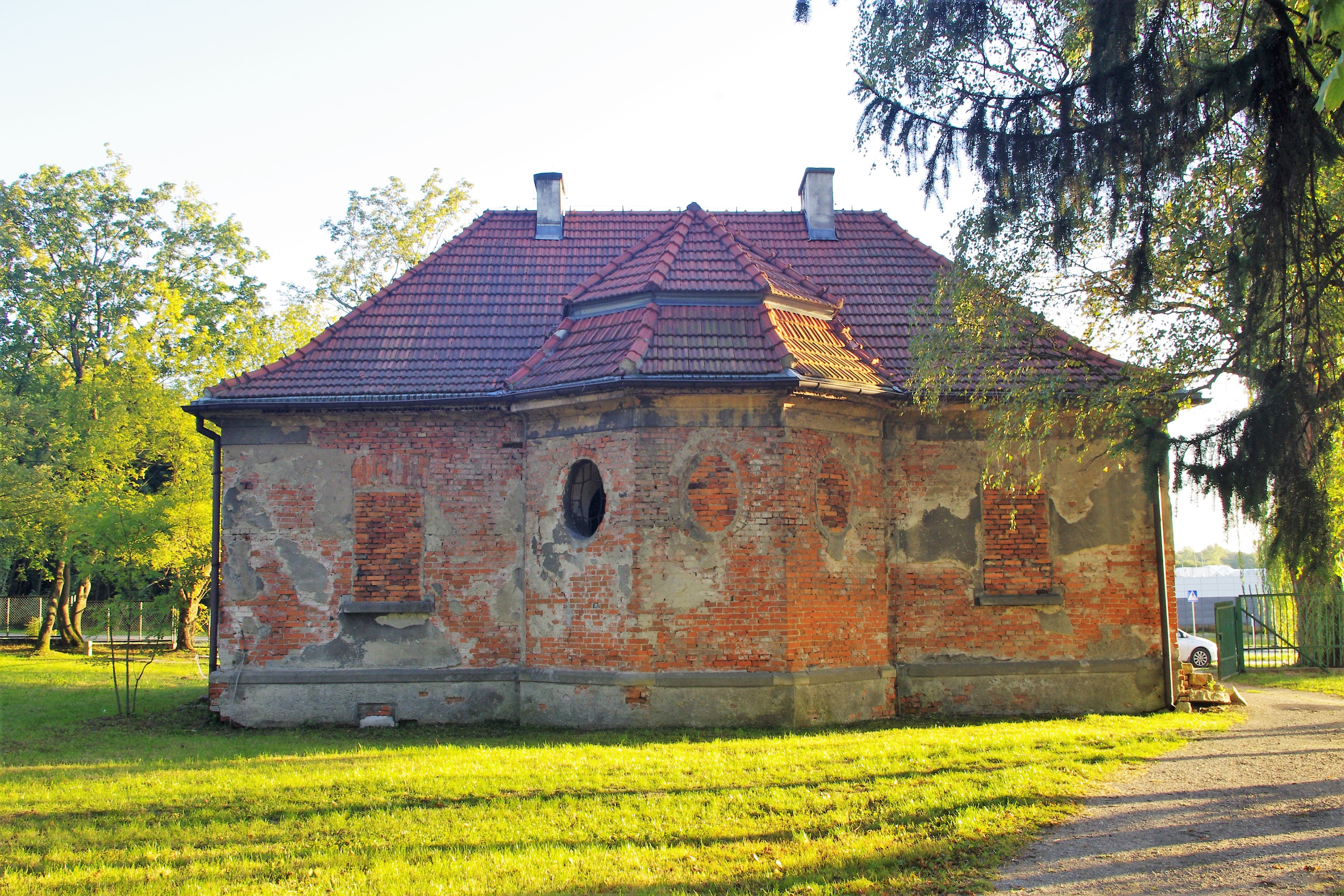
Former mortuary and gravedigger's house on the hospital cemetery

On 22 June, between 8:00 and 9:00 AM, a hospital driver working on the adjacent farm observed a vehicle full of SS men arrive at the cemetery. The SS personnel began digging a large pit in the southern part of the cemetery, in the area previously indicated to Kroll. That same day, gravedigger Bargieł was ordered to immediately vacate his residence at the morgue and relocate with his family to the main hospital grounds. Also on 22 June, Kroll dismissed the nursing nuns and the chaplain.

Between 12:00 and 2:00 PM on 22 June, eight cattle wagons were shunted from Swoszowice railway station onto the hospital's private siding. After uncoupling, the locomotive returned to Swoszowice.

==== 23 June 1942 ====
The criminal liquidation of the patients was directly carried out by SS-Sturmbannführer Karl Meyer, using a subordinate SS unit, with the highly active participation – in full awareness of the purpose and criminal consequences – of the then German director of the institution, Alex Kroll, and SS-Hauptscharführer Dr. Werner Beck, who probably killed the patients left in the pavilions by lethal injections.

— District Commission for the Investigation of Hitlerite Crimes in Kraków

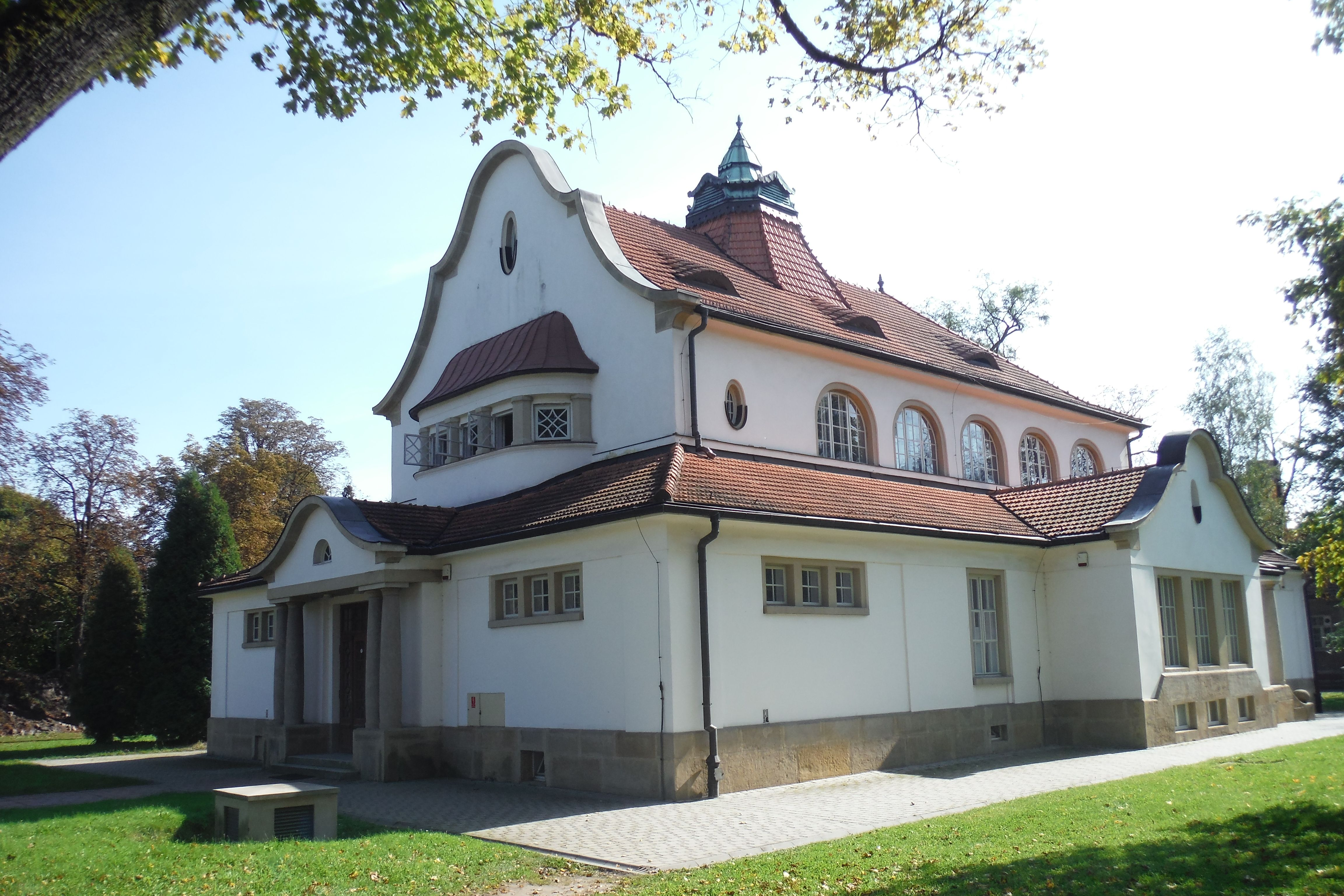
Building of the on-site theatre, where briefings ordered by Kroll were held and where medical staff were detained during the loading of the patients

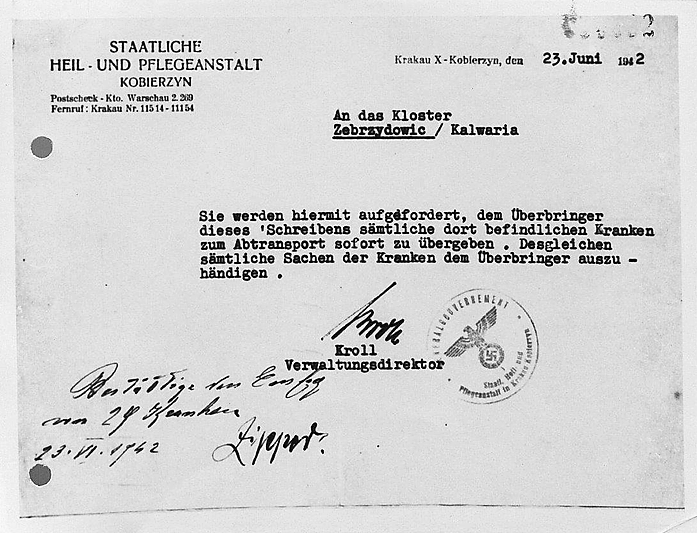
Kroll's order concerning the release of 30 patients from the hospital of the Brothers Hospitallers monastery in Zebrzydowice

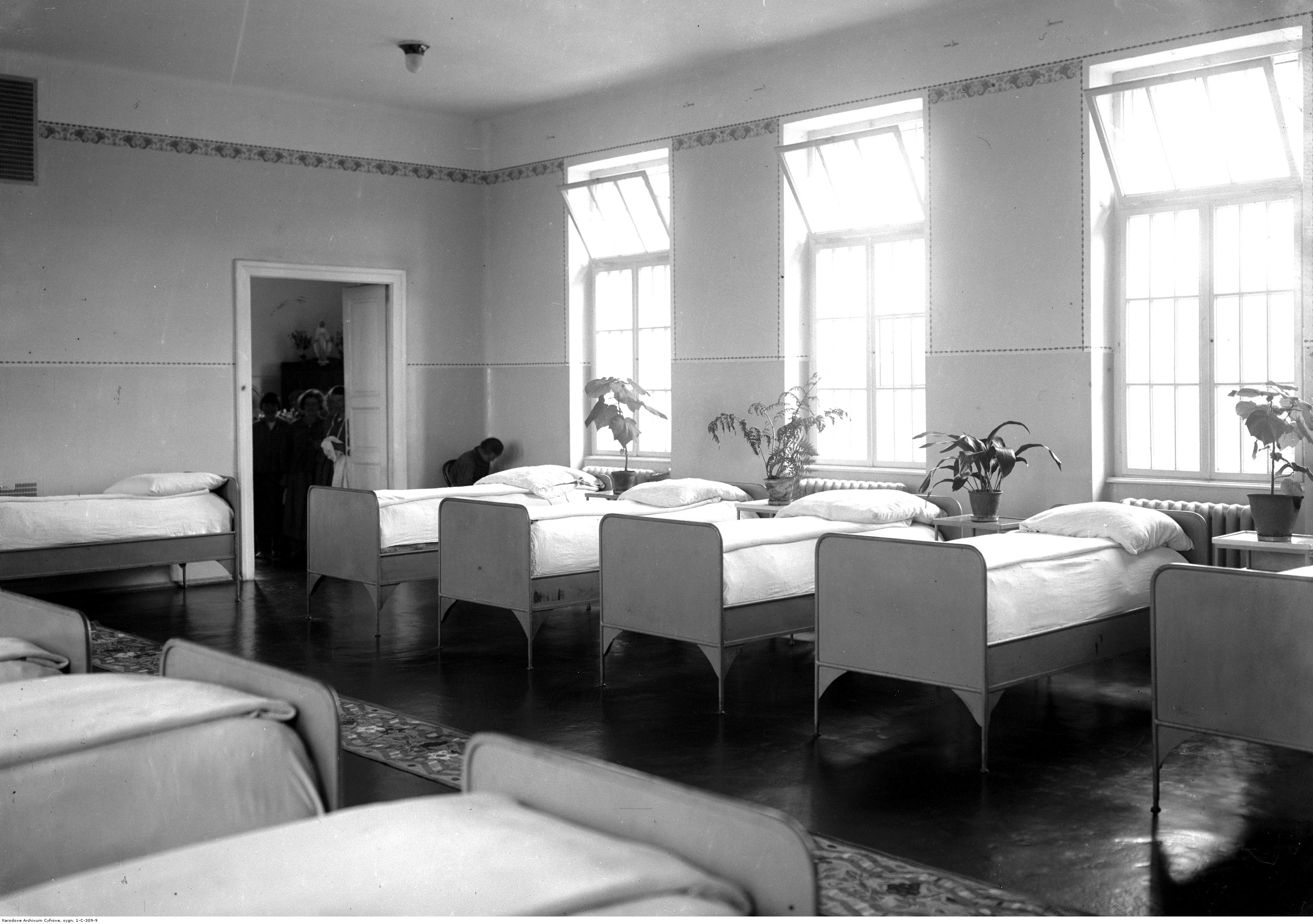
Kobierzyn. Patients' ward in the women's department (August 1927)

In the morning of 23 June, the hospital driver received an order to immediately collect lime from the Liban quarry. He returned before 1:00 PM and around 3:00 PM observed a wagon loaded with lime, driven by German policemen, heading towards the hospital cemetery.

Kroll ordered a staff briefing at 10:00 AM in the hospital theatre building. During the briefing, he announced that the patients would be transferred to Drewnica. Sanitary personnel were ordered to leave the wards by 12:00 PM, with only designated duty staff remaining. At 1:00 PM, a curfew imposed by Kroll began: staff were forbidden from moving around the hospital grounds under threat of shooting and were not allowed to leave their residences until 7:00 AM the next day.

At 11:30 AM, five overseers, led by German head nurse Leo Zipper, were sent to the Brothers Hospitallers monastery and hospital in Zebrzydowice to collect 30 patients who were being treated there under an agreement with Kobierzyn.

Around 1:00 PM, the first SS detachment arrived at the Kobierzyn facility, along with SS-Standartenführer Max Hammer, probably SS-Sturmbannführer Karl Meyer directing the action, and Dr. Werner Beck. The institution was surrounded by a cordon of posts. The vehicle with patients from Zebrzydowice (29 were brought, as one had died) returned around 4:30 PM and stopped near the administrative building before being directed to the railway siding near the boiler house. The patients were loaded by SS men onto the train waiting on the Kobierzyn siding.

The systematic transportation of patients from individual wards began using vehicles. Kroll personally opened the ward doors with his own key, entering the rooms accompanied by German orderlies and doctors who appeared at Kobierzyn that day. Each evacuated pavilion was surrounded by a cordon of armed SS men, and a narrow corridor was formed leading to the waiting vehicles. Patients were counted twice. Duty staff who had remained with the patients were escorted under guard to the hospital theatre building. According to one source, some patients – sensing their fate – prayed aloud, others cursed the Germans, offered active resistance, or even began singing the Polish anthem.

Only those patients too weak for transport were left in the wards. The exact number left behind is unknown, but postwar witness testimonies established that three individuals remained in Ward VI (women's), eight men in Ward VIIIa (male infirmary, including one patient in agony), three intellectually disabled girls on Ward VIIIb (female infirmary), and at least two on Ward IXb.

After the loading of patients into the wagons was completed (before 8:00 PM), a locomotive was brought to the siding and transferred the cars to Swoszowice station. After a stop of approximately 20 minutes, the train departed for the Auschwitz concentration camp. A total of 535 patients from Kobierzyn were murdered in Gas Chamber No. 1 at Auschwitz II-Birkenau. The true destination of the journey was kept secret. It was revealed only in autumn 1942, when an invoice from the General Directorate of the Eastern Railways for the June transport to Auschwitz arrived at the accounting office of the newly established Hitler Youth centre in the former hospital buildings. A new, unaware German cashier, uncertain how to process the document, showed it to Polish employee Adam Zawirski, who had worked in the hospital accounting department both before and after 23 June 1942. The actual destination was thus documented. Zawirski advised the cashier to forward the invoice to Kroll, who had by then assumed directorship of the psychiatric institution in Kulparków. After the war, Zawirski submitted a written report on the matter to the hospital administration.

Only one patient from the institution survived the deportation action: Waleria Białońska from women's Ward Vb. With the assistance of duty nurse Stanisława Pałys, Białońska hid behind a wardrobe in the ward. When the Germans noticed one person was missing, Pałys firmly assured them that all patients had been removed. Under cover of night, Białońska managed to escape the hospital grounds and reached the home of local farmer Purchla, who provided her with shelter.

A second individual who had a chance to survive the operation was Maria Szames, a former patient who simultaneously served as Kroll's maid. She managed to escape the institution and hide in the countryside. Kroll noticed her absence and threatened that if she did not return, he would order the deportation of 50 people (staff members and their families) to Auschwitz. Under this threat, Szames relented and returned to the hospital, hoping that Kroll would protect her as his maid. Kroll, accompanied by head nurse Zipper and one of the SS men, took her to the hospital cemetery, where she was murdered. Nurse Janina Sroka, who worked in women's Ward VIb, described after the war her final encounter with Maria Szames: "As I passed the porter's lodge, I noticed Maria in the company of hospital workers (…) Szames said goodbye to me, saying: ‘See you in heaven'. As I later learned, these workers escorted her to the hospital cemetery. I found out that on that cemetery Kroll personally shot Maria Szames".

A few days after the liquidation of the institution, hospital clerk Tadeusz Datka discovered in his office desk a single copy of the patient list prepared in several duplicates on 23 June. The lists, drawn up in German on eight A4 pages, contained a numerical summary of patients broken down by gender and organised by ward, also including those from Zebrzydowice. Individual entries were arranged alphabetically and included the patient's sequential number, surname and given name, date of birth, nationality, citizenship, and date of admission to the institution. On the surviving copy, sequential numbers were circled twice – once in ordinary pencil and once in red – while surnames were underlined in green pencil. This copy was most likely used on 23 June to verify the headcount as patients were removed from the wards and loaded onto the train. The list indicates that on 23 June 1942 the institution housed 262 men and 305 women, a total of 567 patients. After the war, Datka handed the document over to the new hospital director; it is preserved in the hospital archives.

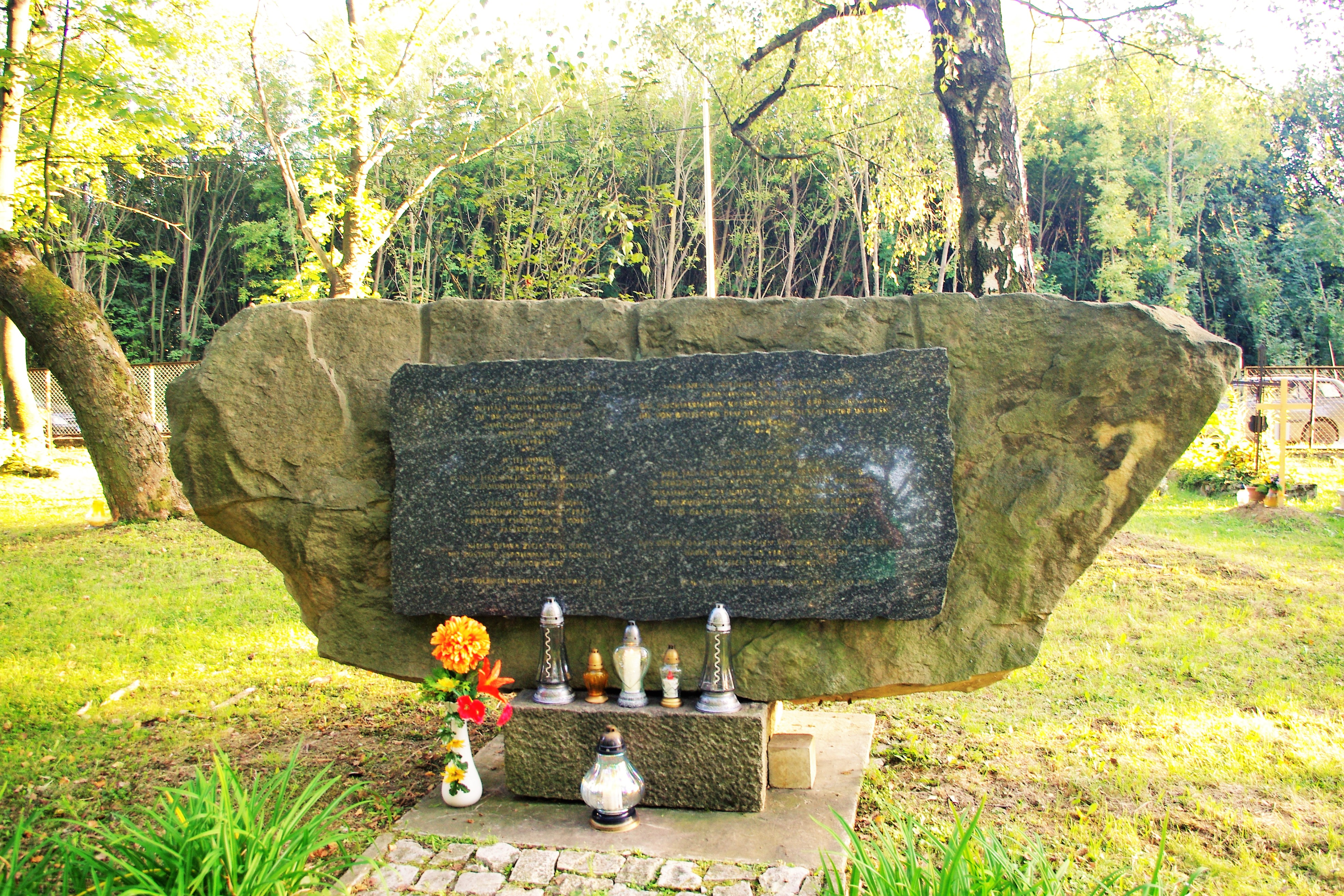
Former hospital cemetery. Mass grave of patients from the hospital in Kobierzyn and Jews from Skawina murdered on 23 June 1942

Plan of the cemetery on Czerwone Maki Street in Kraków – former hospital cemetery in Kobierzyn. In the lower left corner, the mortuary building; to its right, the burial site of the murdered patients and Jews from Skawina

On the hospital grounds, 30 patients were killed, probably by lethal injections administered by Dr. Werner Beck. Their bodies were buried in a mass grave on the institution's cemetery. 25 local Jews were forced to dig and fill the grave; they were subsequently shot and interred in the same pit. Gravedigger Władysław Bargieł and hospital driver Jan Skoczek confirmed that on the morning of 24 June they saw personal belongings and items of clothing discarded beside the still partially open grave, including armbands bearing the Star of David that Jews were required to wear under German occupation. In total, including victims of deliberate starvation, approximately 900–1,000 people were killed by the Germans at the Kobierzyn institution.

==== Attempts to conceal the crime ====
After midnight (between 12:00 and 1:00 AM) on 24 June, Kroll, accompanied by an SS officer and head nurse Leo Zipper, entered the hospital theatre building where the staff had been assembled. He announced that the events of the previous day were subject to strict secrecy and gave the gathered employees 10 minutes to return to their residences on the hospital grounds by the shortest route.

In the subsequent period, the Germans also sought to erase traces of the crime. They produced documentation suggesting that certain patients had died in different locations and at different times. In the files of the postwar investigation, a death certificate issued by the Civil Registry Office in Chełm was found for Halina Parafińska, a patient of the Kobierzyn institution. According to this document, she had supposedly died in Chełm on 20 July 1942 at 2:20 AM. A similar certificate was received by the family of patient Mieczysław Gwoździowski. In reality, the psychiatric hospital in Chełm had been liquidated by the Germans on 12 January 1940, with its patients murdered at that time. The aforementioned certificate was delivered to Parafińska's parents on 22 June 1944. In response to inquiries from other families, the German administration typically replied that the patient had been transferred to Drewnica near Warsaw; over time, they ceased responding to correspondence altogether.

=== Later fate of the facility under German administration ===
In the buildings of the former Kobierzyn institution, the Germans established a centre for the Hitler Youth. Part of the complex housed an SS-Stützpunkt (SS support point) and the SS Lazarett Kobierzyn – a hospital for SS units. The new German occupants spoke highly of the facility, expressing regret that it had previously served such "unproductive purposes". In spring 1944, the sites occupied by German organisations were inspected by Reichsführer-SS and Reich Commissioner for the Consolidation of German Nationhood, Heinrich Himmler.

== Post-war exhumation ==
On 29 and 30 November 1946, an exhumation was carried out on the bodies of victims buried in the mass grave at the hospital cemetery. The operation was directed by Professor Jan Olbrycht, head of the Department of Forensic Medicine at the Jagiellonian University.

The preserved protocol states that the grave contained the remains of 55 individuals, arranged chaotically in layers. Some bodies still bore remnants of hospital clothing, while others were dressed in civilian attire. Personal documents found in the clothing allowed partial identification of some remains as belonging to Jews from the nearby town of Skawina. The skulls of 30 bodies located in the lower part of the grave showed no signs of damage, whereas those in the upper layers exhibited such injuries. It was therefore concluded that the 30 patients from the institution had been killed on the hospital grounds without the use of firearms, and that the Jews forced to bury these patients' bodies were subsequently shot on the spot at the end of the burial and thrown into the same grave. The bodies had been covered with lime during interment.

== Responsibility of Alex Kroll ==
In the 1960s, Alex Kroll worked as an administrative inspector and office manager at the Federal Office for Goods Transport in Munich. He maintained that he had sought to preserve the Kobierzyn hospital. In his notes, he wrote: "Recently, a certain elderly Jew (75 years old), whom I often meet, said that he was glad that, despite the materialistic attitude of the Germans, there are still people who devote their free time to helping others. That is exactly how my entire life in service to others has passed. And I found satisfaction in it. It is beautiful to help others…".

Between 1946 and 1947, the District Commission for the Investigation of German Crimes in Kraków conducted proceedings concerning the liquidation of the hospital. The commission compiled extensive documentation, interviewed numerous witnesses, and ordered the exhumation of bodies buried in the hospital cemetery. The evidentiary material gathered was used in the trial of Josef Bühler, a high-ranking official of the General Government administration and deputy to Hans Frank.

In 1969, the Munich Prosecutor's Office initiated its own proceedings under reference 112 Js 9-10/69 against Joachim Reichel and Alex Kroll, who were "suspected of participating in the murder of mentally ill patients during the liquidation of the State Institution for the Mentally and Nervously Ill in Kobierzyn, as well as causing the deaths of numerous patients through deliberate failure to provide adequate food". On 25 June 1971, the German prosecution discontinued the proceedings. On 30 June 1976, an investigation into the liquidation of the hospital was opened in Poland. It established the guilt of Alex Kroll, Karl Meyer, Werner Beck, and other unidentified SS men. As evidentiary possibilities in Poland were exhausted, the investigation was suspended on 31 December 1977, and the collected materials were forwarded to West German law enforcement authorities.

On 5 October 1979, the Chief Commission for the Investigation of Hitlerite Crimes in Poland sent documentation of the crime, including 28 witness interrogation protocols, to the Central Office of the State Justice Administrations for the Investigation of National Socialist Crimes in Ludwigsburg for the purpose of prosecuting the perpetrators. Four years later, the German side informed that the materials had been transferred to the Prosecutor's Office at the Regional Court in Munich. In response to inquiries from representatives of the Polish commission regarding the status of the proceedings, the Munich Prosecutor's Office stated that case 112 Js 9-10/69 had been discontinued in 1971 "due to insufficient evidence of a crime". According to the German prosecution: "Even from the currently submitted witness interrogation protocols, it emerges that the liquidation of the institution in Kobierzyn was carried out by SS units. None of the submitted witness interrogation protocols allows the conclusion that the accused Kroll could be charged with inadequate provisioning of the institution in Kobierzyn. No statement indicates that the accused Kroll participated in the killings.". Alex Kroll was never held accountable for the crime in Kobierzyn. Dr. Werner Beck also escaped punishment.

== In culture ==
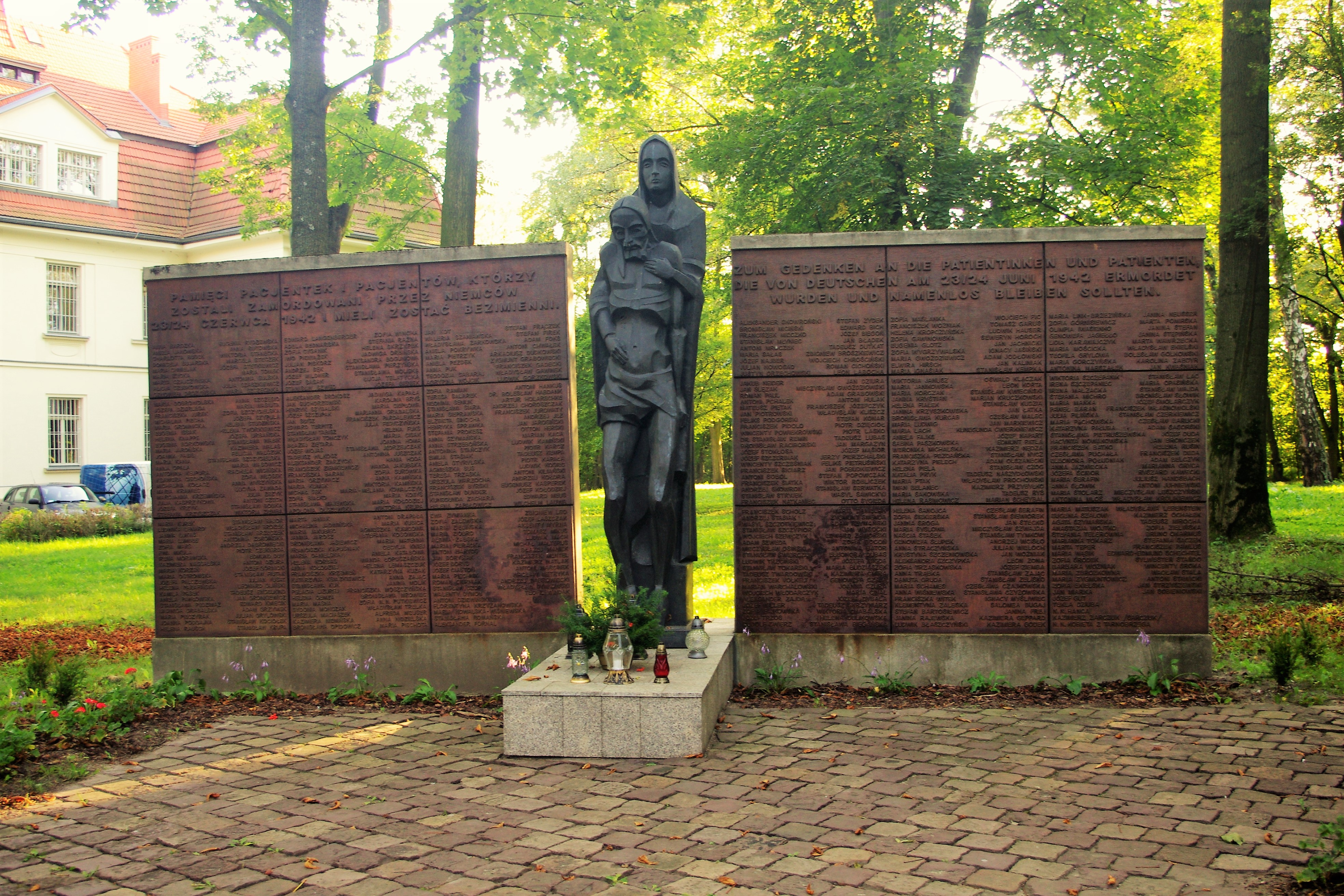
Memorial plaques commemorating the murdered patients of the hospital in Kobierzyn, killed by officials of the Third Reich and the SS on 23 June 1942

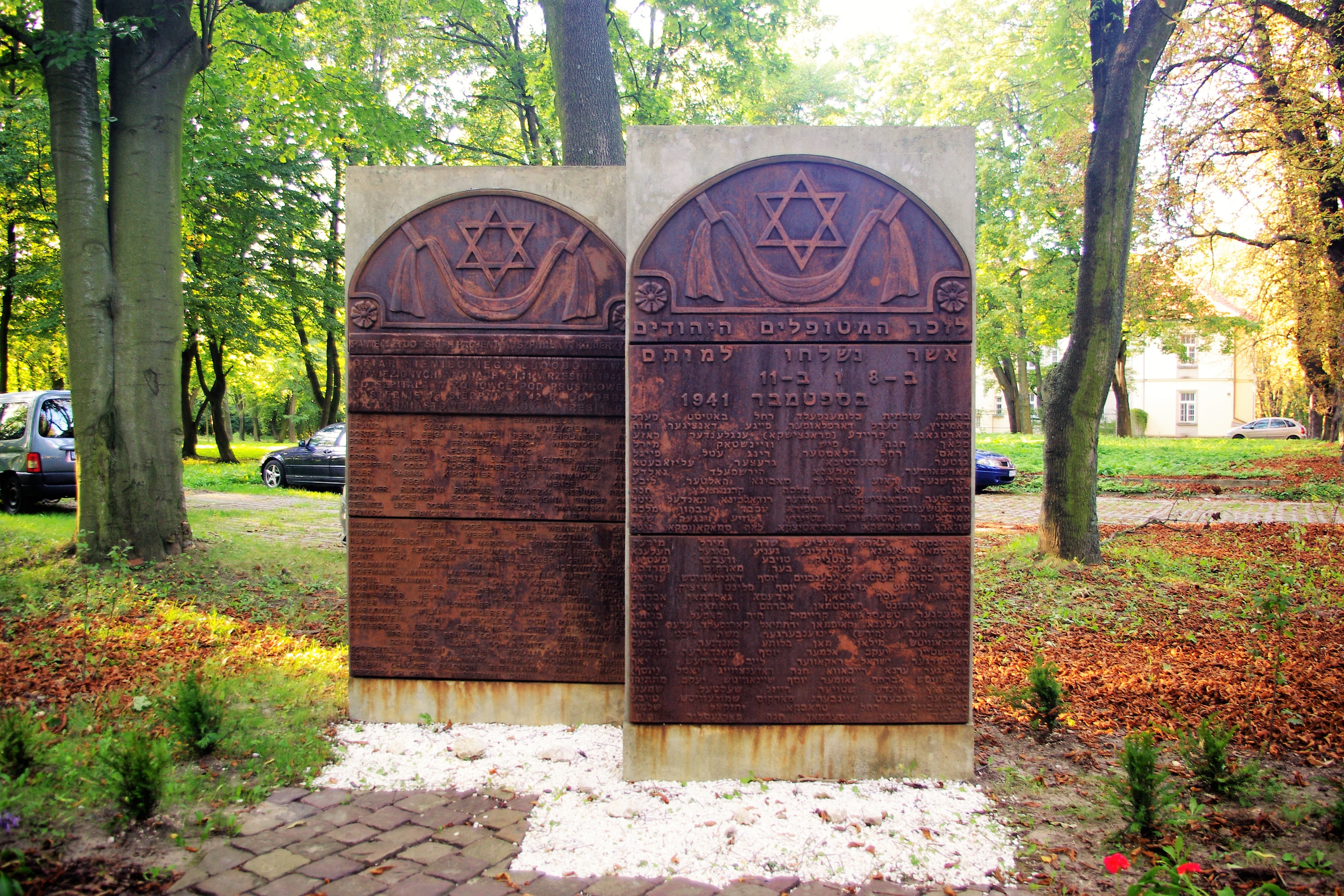
Symbolic massebot on the grounds of the former hospital, commemorating people of Jewish origin

In 1948, Stanisław Lem wrote the novel Hospital of the Transfiguration (first published in 1955), the central theme of which revolves around the extermination of patients in a psychiatric hospital under German occupation. The novel may have been inspired by the German crime committed on 12 January 1940 against patients of the psychiatric hospital in Chełm, as well as the events at the Kobierzyn institution in 1942. In 1978, a Polish film adaptation of the same title was produced, directed by Edward Żebrowski.

The crime also served as inspiration for Andrzej Bursa's poem Likwidacja zakładu dla umysłowo chorych w Kobierzynie przez Niemców (The Liquidation of the Mental Hospital in Kobierzyn by the Germans).

The victims of the Nazi crimes against the patients of the institution are commemorated by a monument located on the grounds of the Dr. Józef Babiński Specialist Hospital in Kraków. It was unveiled on the 60th anniversary of the hospital's liquidation.

== Bibliography ==
- Kiełkowski, Roman (1981). ... Zlikwidować na miejscu!: z dziejów okupacji hitlerowskiej w Krakowie [Liquidate on the spot!: From the history of the Hitlerite occupation in Kraków] (in Polish). Kraków: Wydawnictwo Literackie. ISBN 83-08-00522-5.
- Nasierowski, Tadeusz (2008). Zagłada osób z zaburzeniami psychicznymi w okupowanej Polsce: początek ludobójstwa [The extermination of the mentally disturbed in occupied Poland: The beginning of genocide] (in Polish). Warsaw: Neriton. ISBN 978-83-7543-037-0.
