= Death of a President =

Death of a President can refer to:

- Death of a President (1977 film), a 1977 Polish film directed by Jerzy Kawalerowicz about Gabriel Narutowicz
- Death of a President (2006 film), a 2006 British docudrama about a fictional assassination of real-life US president George W. Bush
- The Death of a President, book on the assassination of John F. Kennedy
