= Hospital of the Transfiguration =

1975 book by Stanisław Lem

- First standalone edition (1975)
- Author: Stanisław Lem
- Original title: Szpital Przemienienia
- Translator: William Brand
- Language: Polish
- Publisher: Czytelnik
- Publication date: 1975
- Publication place: Poland
- English publication date: 1988
- Media type: Print
- Pages: 207
- ISBN: 0-15-142186-2
- LC Class: PG7158.L39 S913 1988
- Preceded by: Man From Mars
- Followed by: The Astronauts

Hospital of the Transfiguration (in Polish: Szpital Przemienienia) is a book by Polish writer Stanisław Lem. It tells the story of a young doctor, Stefan Trzyniecki, who after graduation starts to work in a psychiatric hospital. The story takes place during the Nazi occupation of Poland in the Second World War.

The book is the first of a trilogy entitled Time Not Lost, and the only one of the three translated into English.

The book was adapted as a film of the same name (Hospital of the Transfiguration) in 1979, directed by Edward Żebrowski.

Hospital of the Transfiguration is also available in paperback under ISBN 0-15-642176-3 (Mariner Books, 1991).

Here "transfiguration" refers to the Transfiguration of Jesus and accordingly to the Church of the Transfiguration.

== See also ==
- Massacre of patients at the Kobierzyn psychiatric hospital
