= List of awards and honours received by Stanisław Lem =

This is the list of honors bestowed on Stanisław Lem.

- 1955: Gold Cross of Merit (Poland)
- 1957 – City of Kraków's Prize in Literature (Nagroda Literacka miasta Krakowa) for the totality of the literary work, with the special mention of Time Not Lost
- 1959: Officer's Cross of the Order of Polonia Restituta
- 1965 – Prize of the Minister of Culture and Art, 2nd Level (Nagroda Ministra Kultury i Sztuki II stopnia)
- 1970:
  - Commander's Cross of the Order of Polonia Restituta
  - Prize of the Minister of Foreign Affairs for popularization of Polish culture abroad (nagroda Ministra Spraw Zagranicznych za popularyzację polskiej kultury za granicą)
- 1973 Literary Prize of the Minister of Culture and Art (nagroda literacka Ministra Kultury i Sztuki) and honorary member of Science Fiction Writers of America
- 1976 – State Prize 1st Level in the area of literature (Nagroda Państwowa I stopnia w dziedzinie literatury)
- 1979
  - Order of the Banner of Work of the 2nd class
  - Grand Prix de Littérature Policière for his novel Katar.
  - A minor planet, 3836 Lem, discovered by Soviet astronomer Nikolai Stepanovich Chernykh in 1979, is named after him.
- 1981 – Doctor honoris causa honorary degree from the Wrocław University of Technology
- 1986 – Austrian State Prize for European Literature
- 1987 Honorary title "Person of Merit for National Culture" ("Zasłużony dla kultury narodowej"), Polish Council of State
- 1991 – Austrian literary Franz Kafka Prize
- 1994 – member of the Polish Academy of Learning
- 1996 – recipient of the Order of the White Eagle
- 1997 – honorary citizen of Kraków
- 1998 – Doctor honoris causa: University of Opole, Lviv University, Jagiellonian University
- 2001 – Golden Scepter (Polish: Złote Berło) Award of the Polish Culture Foundation and BIG Bank Gdański for "the overtaking his time with the thought" ("za wyprzedzenie myślą swego czasu")
- 2003 – Doctor honoris causa from Bielefeld University
- 2005 - Medal for Merit to Culture – Gloria Artis (on the list of the first recipients of the newly introduced medal)
- 2007
  - A street in Kraków is to be named in his honour.
  - An exoplanet named Pirx was found orbiting the K-type main sequence star Solaris about 161 light-years (49 parsecs, or nearly 1.5×10^{15} km) from Earth in the constellation Pegasus.
- 2009 – A street in Wieliczka was named in his honour
- 2011 – An elaborate interactive Google Doodle inspired by The Cyberiad was created and published in his honor for the 60th anniversary of his first published book: The Astronauts.
- 2013 – two planetoids were named after Lem's literary characters: 343000 Ijontichy, after Ijon Tichy and 343444 Halluzinelle, after Tichy's holographic companion Analoge Halluzinelle from German TV series Ijon Tichy: Space Pilot
