= Andrzej Kijowski =

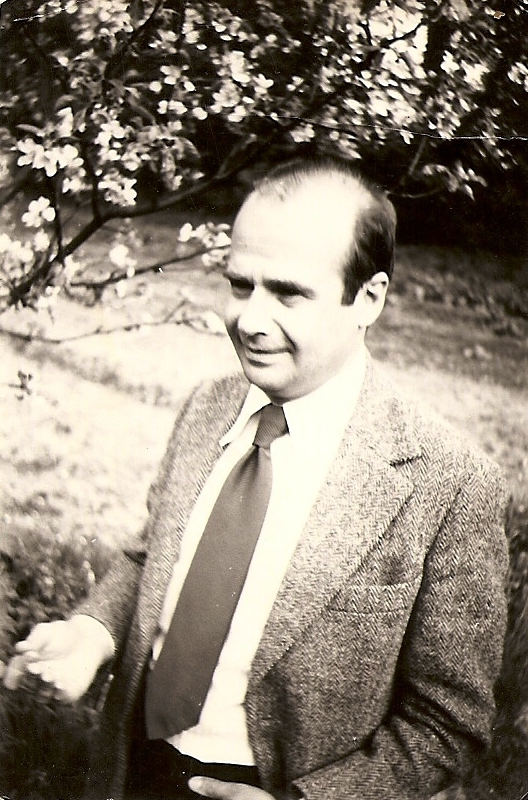
- In Front Of The House the Actor in Skolimów near Warsaw, May 1973
- Born: 29 November 1928; Kraków, Poland
- Died: 29 June 1985 (aged 56); Warsaw, Poland
- Citizenship: Poland
- Education: University of Kraków (1948–1953)
- Occupations: writer, political activist, director
- Children: one son Andrzej Tadeusz Kijowski
- Writing career
- Pen name: Dedal
- Genres: essay prose, screenwriter
- Notable work: The Accused
- Notable awards: 2008:Commander's Cross of the Polonia Restituta
- Website: www.andrzej.kijowski.pl

Not to be mistaken for Andrzej Tadeusz Kijowski, his son.

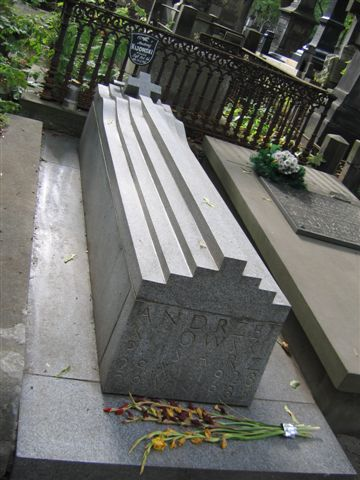
Andrzej Kijowski's grave in the Powązki graveyard in Warsaw, designed by Jerzy Jarnuszkiewicz

Andrzej Kijowski (29 November 1928 – 29 June 1985) was a Polish literary critic, essayist and screenwriter.

== Biography ==
Kijowski was born on 29 November 1928 in Kraków, Poland.

Kijowski wrote for such publications as Przegląd Kulturalny and Tygodnik Powszechny. He was editor for many years of Twórczość, where the well-known Kroniki Dedala ("Daedalus Chronicles") was published.

He authored the Polish writers' resolution against censorship after the play Dziady (Ghost) by Adam Mickiewicz was withdrawn from the stage on 29 February 1968. A literary director at Warsaw's Dramatic Theatre from 1967 to 1968, he was removed by the Communist authorities. He was one of the organizers of the Polish Flying University.

He was the director at Juliusz Słowacki Theatre in Kraków from 1981 until he resigned in February 1982 after being released from Jaworze, where he had been interned for reasons connected to Martial law in Poland.

He died on 29 June 1985 in Warsaw.

His son is poet and critic Andrzej Tadeusz Kijowski.

== Legacy ==
The Andrzej Kijowski Award for literary achievements was set up in 1985.

== Literary work ==
Wrote stories

- Oskarżony (The Accused)
- Pseudonimy (Pseudonyms)
- Szyfry (The Codes)
- Dyrygent (The Orchestra Conductor)

Wrote critical essays

- Miniatury krytyczne (Critical Miniatures)
- Szósta Dekada (The Sixties)
- Listopadowy wieczór (November Evening)

Wrote screenplays

- Szyfry (The Codes)
- Wesele (The Wedding)
- Dyrygent (The Orchestra Conductor)
- Z Dalekiego Kraju (From a Far Country)
- Pasja (1977)

== Honors ==
2008: Commander's Cross of the Polonia Restituta
