= Men of the Blue Cross =

Polish 1955 film

- Polish: Błękitny krzyż
- Directed by: Andrzej Munk
- Written by: Andrzej Munk; Adam Liberak
- Produced by: Wilhelm Hollender
- Cinematography: Sergiusz Sprudin
- Edited by: Jadwiga Zajiček
- Music by: Jan Krenz
- Production company: Warsaw Documentary Film Studio
- Release date: October 12, 1955 (Poland)
- Running time: 55 minutes
- Country: Poland
- Language: Polish

Men of the Blue Cross (Polish: Błękitny krzyż) is a Polish war narrative-documentary film from 1955 directed by Andrzej Munk, based on Adam Liberak's short story Journey for Life. The film reconstructs the authentic action of the Tatra Volunteer Search and Rescue, which in February 1945 evacuated a partisan mountain hospital through the German-Soviet front line during World War II. In the Men of the Blue Cross, narrated by Gustaw Holoubek, some of the participants of that action appeared, including Stanisław Gąsienica Byrcyn and Stanisław Marusarz.

Men of the Blue Cross served as a bridge for Munk between his previous documentary work and later achievements in narrative filmmaking. However, the experiment of combining two types of film did not appeal to the contemporary film critics, who criticized Munk for indecisiveness regarding the adopted convention. Only years later was the Men of the Blue Cross partially rehabilitated, largely due to the presence of non-professional actors and the cinematography of Sergiusz Sprudin.

== Plot ==
At the beginning of the film appears the text:

The story of this expedition is a true story. The minor changes introduced by the authors in the course of the narrative do not change its essence or meaning in any significant way. Among the characters appearing in the film, we will encounter authentic heroes of that event. It is to them that the authors dedicate this film – to the mountain partisans of the war years and the rescuers of the Tatra Volunteer Search and Rescue – the people of the Blue Cross.

The action of the film takes place in February 1945 during World War II, when German garrisons were stationed in Slovakia. Through the snowy Tatra passes wanders a Slovak doctor, Dr. Juraj. He reaches Zakopane, where he contacts the Soviet command, asking for help for his Slovak and Soviet patients from a partisan mountain hospital in a mountain hut, located on the German-occupied side of the Tatras.

The action moves to that hut, where the nurse Bożena treats the wounded or those suffering from frostbite. One of the Slovak partisans stands guard, noticing that a German unit has taken up residence in the area. While waiting for help, the partisans light a "partisan star" to improve morale. At that moment, the guard enters the hut, informing about the approaching German unit. Meanwhile, one of the wounded patients must have his frostbitten leg amputated.

Meanwhile, a group of Polish mountain rescuers sets out with the task of transporting the wounded and sick partisans to the Polish side through two mountain chains and German guard lines. Among those in the team heading for the border are experienced mountaineers Stanisław Gąsienica Byrcyn, Stanisław Gąsienica of Las, and Stanisław Marusarz. Crossing the mountain chain is made difficult by the weather conditions (snowstorm) and the couloirs the mountaineers climb. When Byrcyn calls his stubborn dog during the climb, an avalanche unexpectedly falls on the rescuers. However, it turns out that no one was hurt. Along the way, the group encounters a Soviet outpost, reaching the front line.

Soon, the mountaineers are forced to leave the dog and skis behind and trek through the forest trails to avoid detection by German patrols. At midnight, Juraj arrives with a group of rowers at a mountain hut. After having a meal, the mountaineers take the wounded and conduct the evacuation. However, the Germans track them down, initiating a pursuit of the rescuers. They manage to cross the line of the Soviet outpost and take the dog with the skis, but the covering Soviet soldier is hit. The Slovak guard and Byrcyn separate from the group to cover it from a potential attack by a German patrol. However, gunfire from a nearby Soviet outpost forces the Germans to retreat, allowing Byrcyn and the Slovak guard to rejoin the group. The rowers return to Zakopane on skis, and the action turns out to be a success.

== Cast ==
- Gustaw Holoubek as Narrator
- Stanisław Gąsienica Byrcyn
- Stanisław Wawrytko
- Stanisław Marusarz
- Stanisław Gąsienica of Las
- Ludwik Ziemblic as Doctor Juraj
- Józef Krzeptowski
- Józef Wawrytko
- Wojciech Siemion as a Soviet partisan
- Elżbieta Polkowska as Nurse Bożenka
- Tadeusz Giewont
- Roman Hoły
- Władysław Gondek
- Stefan Joniak
- Jakub Wawrytko
- Andrzej Walczak
- Jan Krzystyniak

== Production ==
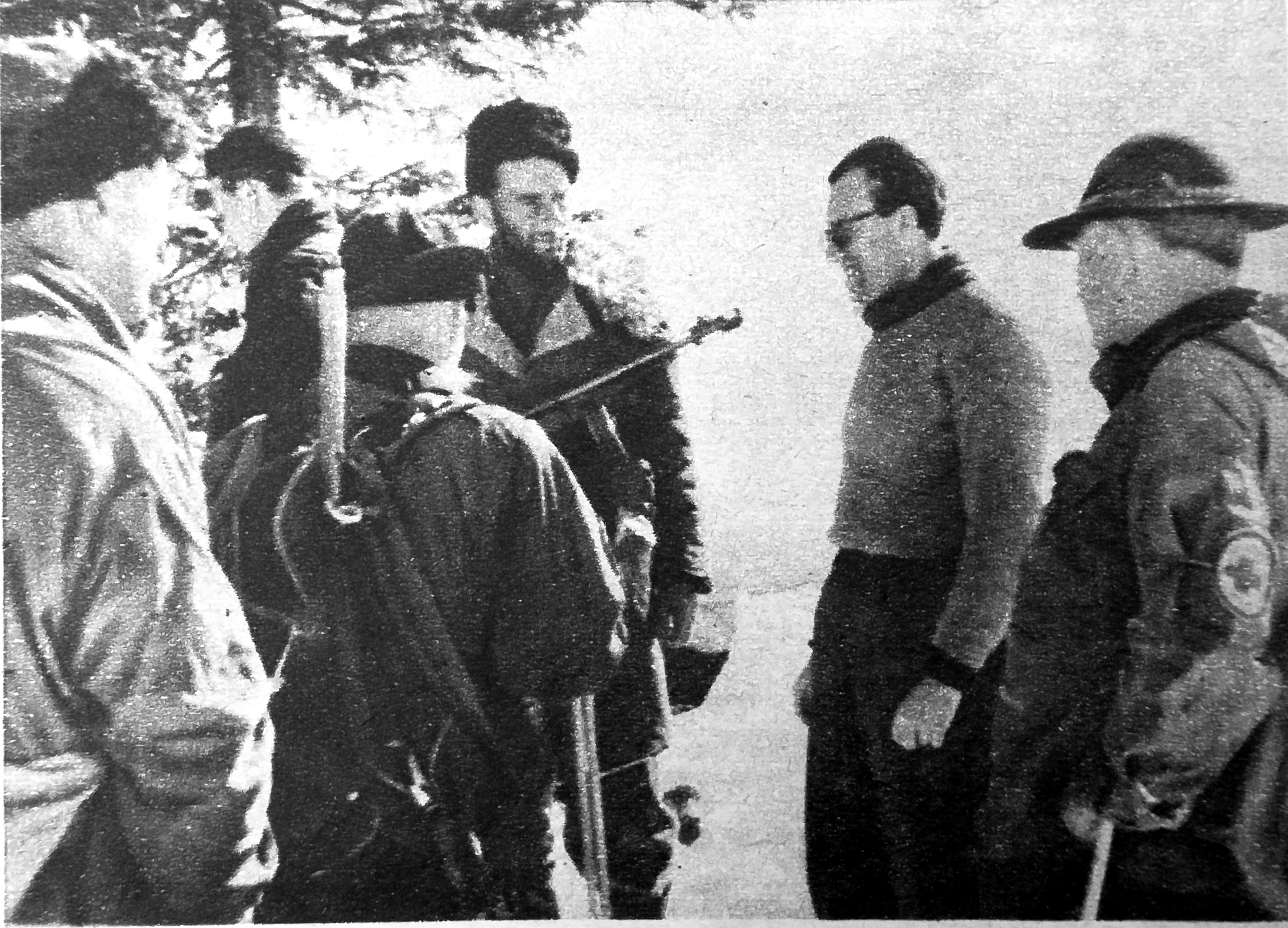
Photo from the set of the film the Men of the Blue Cross; Andrzej Munk second from the right (1955)

After the production of the documentary Stars Must Burn, Andrzej Munk attempted a creative experiment at the border between narrative and documentary film. Taking Adam Liberak's short story as the starting point for creating Men of the Blue Cross was a novelty for the director, who was an experienced documentarian. The action of the Tatra Volunteer Search and Rescue in February 1945, involving the evacuation of wounded Soviet partisans from behind the German defense line to Zverovka clearing in the Zuber Valley, served as a point of reference for both the story and the film. Fourteen mountaineers, led by Zbigniew Korosadowicz, participated in the action. However, unlike the events depicted on the screen, the involvement of the mountaineers was not voluntary; the rescuers undertook the action under the threat of death from the Soviet authorities. Marek Lubaś-Harny from Gazeta Krakowska emphasized that "regardless of political conditions and propaganda efforts, it is difficult not to acknowledge that the action in the Zuber Valley was a difficult to dispute, albeit unusual, success of the Tatra Volunteer Search and Rescue".

The theme of Liberak's prose was close to the director because at the turn of 1944 and 1945, Munk worked as a laborer and a cable car stoker on Kasprowy Wierch. Munk wrote the screenplay himself based on the short story, and the commentary was entrusted to journalist and publicist Karol Małcużyński. Gustaw Holoubek, who embodied the role of the narrator, delivered the commentary with sensitivity. Specialist in documentary filmmaking, Sergiusz Sprudin, was responsible for the cinematography. The director limited the number of professional actors to a minimum (with Wojciech Siemion as an exception), while the main acting roles were played by mountain guides, including Stanisław Byrcyn Gąsienica, Stanisław Gąsienica of Las, Ludwik Ziemblic, Stanisław Marusarz, Józef Krzeptowski, Józef Wawrytka, and Elżbieta Polkowska.

Filming began in late January and early February 1955 on both the Polish and Czechoslovak (now Slovak) sides of the Tatras. The outdoor shooting process took place in harsh conditions. Some crew members were secured with ropes during the filming of the avalanche scene, which, intentionally triggered, almost cost Byrcyn his life due to the impact. An Arriflex camera was used for shooting. The final scenes were filmed in late February and early March 1955, and the total recorded film material amounted to 1800 meters. The pre-premiere screening of the Men of the Blue Cross took place at the Central Office of Cinematography on 10 October 1955, while the premiere in cinemas occurred on 12 October 1955.

=== Editions ===
In 2006, the Men of the Blue Cross was released on DVD by the Polish Audiovisual Publishers as part of the Polish School of Documentary series. The reissued version of the Men of the Blue Cross was released along with a collection of other documentaries by Andrzej Munk in 2009.

== Reception ==
In Poland, initially the Men of the Blue Cross was met with disappointment. Antoni Kroh recalled that during a screening in Warsaw, during the dramatic scene of the partisan's leg amputation, the audience burst into laughter when the screen partisan began singing a Soviet song. Jerzy Płażewski criticized Munk for being unable to decide whether to create a documentary or a narrative film. Płażewski summed up the Men of the Blue Cross as a "borderline genre" that "did not satisfy either fans of documentary or narrative films". In a review for Życie Warszawy, Stanisław Grzelecki wrote that the director: "Limited by the size of the documentary film, and above all by the fundamental assumption, did not go beyond the sketch and, by creating something saturated with possibilities, left the viewer feeling unsatisfied". Adam Pawlikowski from Przegląd Kulturalny stated that the Men of the Blue Cross gives the impression of an unfinished artistic narrative film, while the level of authenticity in it "is too weak for the film to be a documentary". Pawlikowski, however, praised the skillful camera work, considering the cinematography the strongest aspect of the Men of the Blue Cross. On the other hand, Aleksander Jackiewicz argued that Munk's film lacked dramatic intensity, and the Men of the Blue Cross is only "a neatly made adventure story, in which the man, nature, and fight are just a pretext for sensational action". Similarly, Jan Antoni Szczepański from Trybuna Ludu evaluated Munk's work as "a mixing of genres that creates a not very fortunate hybrid and causes dissatisfaction". However, Szczepański emphasized the propaganda value of the film, recommending it for "viewing by the widest masses of youth" and "promotion by the Union of Polish Youth activists". Zbigniew Pitera from Film appreciated "an interesting theme, good direction of several episodes, beautiful cinematography, skillful editing", but compared the blend of two film genres to "a greedy ride on the border between both genres".

There were also positive opinions. In a polemical review against Pitera's voice, Czesław Michalski stated that "Munk [...] is a good rider and firmly sits in the saddle riding on this imaginary barrier, supposedly separating the documentary film from the narrative one". Kazimierz Dębnicki also attacked Pitera, "who addressed the theoretical problem of whether such a mixture should be made at all and, having come to the conclusion that it should not, condemned the film in a purely speculative way, defending the principle". Despite the predominance of negative criticism, the director himself admitted that "the Men of the Blue Cross convinced me of the impossibility of fully showing the inner experiences of the hero by documentary method".

Nevertheless, attempts were made to rehabilitate the film. Barbara Mruklik stated that "from today's point of view, the discussions at that time seem academic, even scholastic", and the main value of the Men of the Blue Cross is precisely "the blending of genres [...]. Munk emerged victorious from the documentary attempt to organize material for the needs of a narrative film". Małgorzata Hendrykowska wrote that the presence of non-professional actors in the Men of the Blue Cross "gave this sensational story an extraordinary value of authenticity". Similarly, Thérèse Laforest from the French magazine Séquences considered the film to be "convincing. This one-hour film, strictly documentary in tone, says everything it wants to say about the courage of the men who really accomplished this feat in February 1945". Kevin Filipski from The New York Times stated that "non-professional actors add tension and authenticity to the film", and most importantly, "Munk focuses less on conveying ideological messages and more on deepening the drama of the dangerous and heroic mission of the men". Leslie Camhi from The Village Voice added that the film is important because of "the spectacular cinematography and the specter of death hanging over all participants in the action". However, Stuart Klawans from Film Comment had a different opinion, sarcastically assessing the Men of the Blue Cross as a "typical tribute to the Soviet bloc, full of admiration for the simple, smiling, indomitable people who managed to defeat fascism and still found time to pose for their close-ups".

The Men of the Blue Cross was honored with the bronze medal at the Venice Film Festival, as well as the 2nd Prize at the Trento Film Festival. It was the only Polish feature film from 1955 to be recognized in any way at international festivals. In a plebiscite by the editorial staff of Film in 1956, with the votes of 664 readers, the Men of the Blue Cross ranked fourth on the list of the best Polish films, losing to Irena do domu!, Godziny nadziei and Trzy starty.

== Bibliography ==
- Camhi, Leslie (2002-02-05). "Pole vault". Village Voice.
- Dębnicki, Kazimierz (1955a). "W słońcu i zamieci". Film (in Polish). 21.
- Dębnicki, Kazimierz (1955b). "Pochwała niedosytu". Film (in Polish). 45.
- Filipski, Kevin (2002-01-27). "At the Nexus of Tragic and Absurd". The New York Times.
- Grzelecki, Stanisław (1955). "Błękitny krzyż". Życie Warszawy (in Polish). 254.
- Hendrykowska, Małgorzata (2012). Kronika kinematografii polskiej 1895–2011 (in Polish). Poznań: Ars Nova. ISBN 978-83-87433-83-3.
- Hendrykowski, Marek (2007). Andrzej Munk (in Polish). Warsaw: Biblioteka "Więzi". ISBN 978-83-60356-33-3.
- Jackiewicz, Aleksander (1964). "Twórczość". Andrzej Munk (in Polish). Warsaw: Wydawnictwa Artystyczne i Filmowe.
- Klawans, Stuart (2002). "Life is beautiful". Film Comment.
- Kroh, Antoni (2013). "Muzeum Tatrzańskie – moja pierwsza i ostatnia miłość". Konteksty (in Polish). 1.
- Laforest, Thérèse (1967). "Les Hommes de la Croix bleue (analyse)". Séquences (in French). 49.
- Michalski, Czesław (1955). "Kropla śmietanki nie zawadzi". Film (in Polish). 44.
- Mruklik, Barbara (1974). "Film fabularny". In Toeplitz, Jerzy (ed.). Historia filmu polskiego (in Polish). Vol. 3. Warsaw: Wydawnictwa Artystyczne i Filmowe.
- Munk, Andrzej (1964). "O sobie". Andrzej Munk (in Polish). Warsaw: Wydawnictwa Artystyczne i Filmowe.
- Pawlikowski, Adam (1955). "Błękitny krzyż". Przegląd Kulturalny (in Polish). 42.
- Pitera, Zbigniew (1955). "Nie lubię mieszaniny". Film (in Polish). 44.
- Szczepański, Jan Antoni (1955). "Opowieść tatrzańska". Trybuna Ludu (in Polish). 291.
