= Gustaw Holoubek =

Polish actor, director and senator (1923-2008)

Gustaw Holoubek Order of the White Eagle Order of Polonia Restituta Gold Gloria Artis Medal
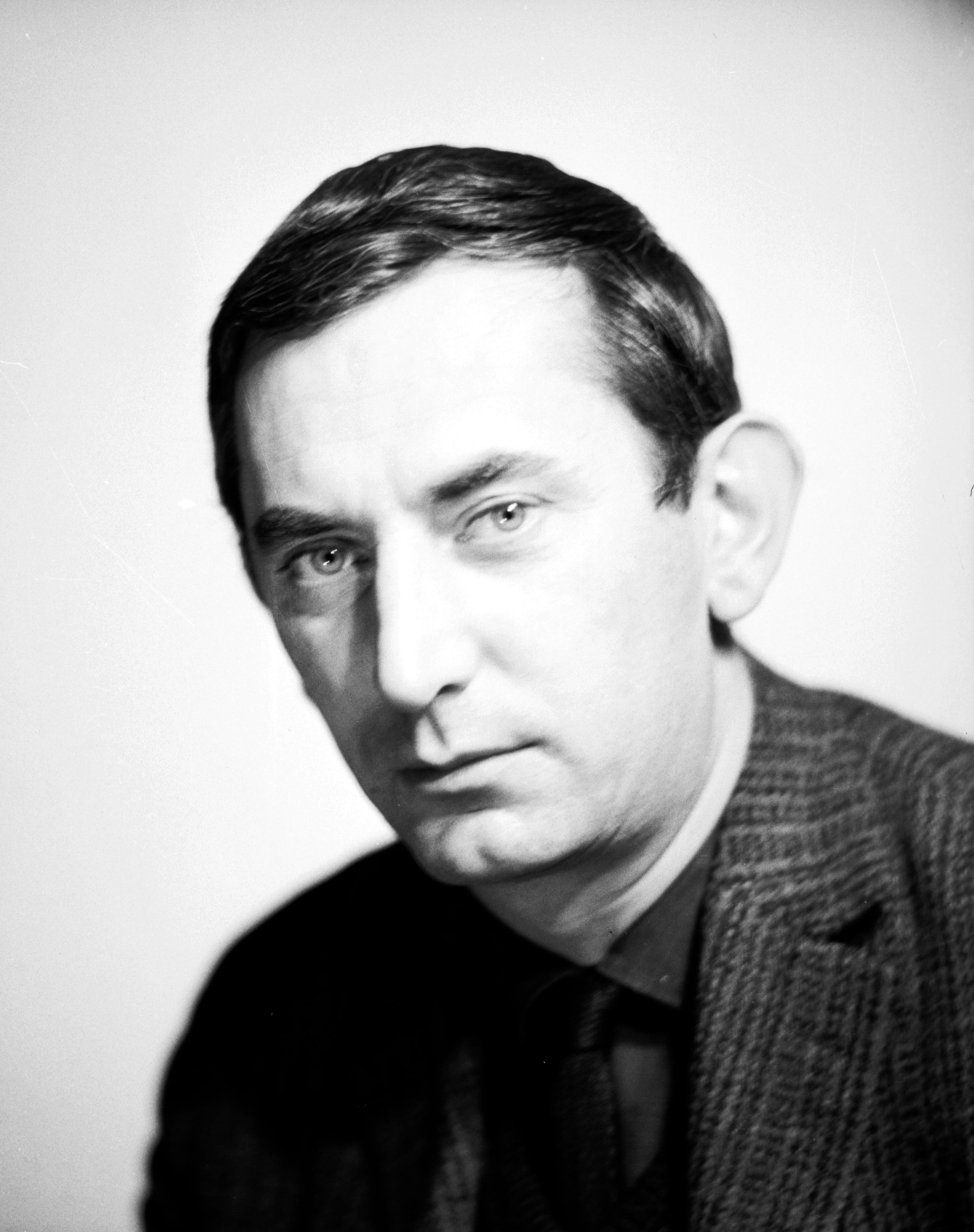
- Gustaw Holoubek
- Born: 21 April 1923; Kraków, Poland
- Died: 6 March 2008 (aged 84); Warsaw, Poland
- Years active: 1947–2008
- Spouse(s): Danuta Kwiatkowska (?–?); Maria Wachowiak (?–?); Magdalena Zawadzka (1973–2008)

Gustaw Teofil Holoubek (21 April 1923 – 6 March 2008) was a Polish actor, director, member of the Polish Sejm, and a senator.

== Biography ==
Holoubek participated in the September Campaign and was a prisoner of war during the Nazi German Occupation of Poland. His father was a Czech immigrant who settled in Poland after the First World War, and his mother was Polish.

Holoubek had his first role as an actor in 1947, thus beginning his lifelong career in theatre and film in Poland and abroad. His political career began in 1976, when he was elected to the Sejm, the lower house of the Polish Parliament. He was re-elected in 1980, but resigned in 1981 when martial law was declared. In 1989, he was elected to the Senate, the upper house. That same year, he took a position as a professor at the Academy of Theatre in Warsaw. Holoubek was a recipient of the Order of Polonia Restituta (Knight's Cross, Commander's Cross with Star, Grand Cross).

== Selected filmography ==
- 1953: The Soldier of Victory (Żołnierz zwycięstwa) - Feliks Dzierzynski
- 1955: Błękitny krzyż - Narrator (voice)
- 1956: Tajemnica dzikiego szybu - Class teacher Sadej
- 1958: The Noose (Pętla) - Kuba Kowalski
- 1958: Farewells (Pożegnania) - Mirek
- 1959: Bialy niedzwiedz - Henryk Fogiel
- 1960: Wspólny pokój (Roomers) - Dziadzia
- 1960: Kolorowe ponczochy - Educator
- 1961: Marysia i krasnoludki
- 1961: Rozstanie (Goodbye to the Past)
- 1961: Time Past (Czas przeszły) - Von steinhagen
- 1961: Story of the Golden Boot(Historia żółtej ciżemki) - Wit Stwosz
- 1962: Opening Tomorrow (Jutro premiera) - Zenon Wiewiórski
- 1962: Spóznieni przechodnie - Edward (segment "Czas przybliza, czas oddala")
- 1962: Slantzeto i syankata - Znamenitiyat aktyor
- 1962: Cafe from the Past (Spotkanie w "Bajce") - Doctor Pawel
- 1963: Gangsters and Philanthropists (Gangsterzy i filantropi) - Professor
- 1963: Yesterday in Fact (Naprawdę wczoraj) - Captain Stolyp
- 1964: The Law and the Fist (Prawo i piesc) - Andrzej Kenig
- 1965: The Saragossa Manuscript (Rękopis znaleziony w Saragossie) - Don Pedro Velasquez
- 1965: Salto - Host
- 1965: The Moment of Peace (Les rideaux blancs)
- 1966: Maria and Napoleon (Marysia i Napoleon) - Napoleon Bonaparte - Napoleon Beranger
- 1969: Pan Wolodyjowski
- 1969: Gra - Husband
- 1970: Salt of the Black Earth (Sól ziemi czarnej) - Narrator (voice, uncredited)
- 1971: Pejzaz z bohaterem - Rafal Wilczewski, History Teacher
- 1971: Dzieciol - Thief (voice, uncredited)
- 1971: Goya or the Hard Way to Enlightenment (Goya – oder der arge Weg der Erkenntnis) - Bermudez
- 1972: How Far, How Near (Jak daleko stad, jak blisko) - Maks
- 1973: The Hourglass Sanatorium (Sanatorium pod klepsydrą) - Dr. Gotard
- 1978: A Room with a View on the Se (Pokój z widokiem na morze) - Profesor Jan Leszczynski
- 1978: Hospital of the Transfiguration (Szpital przemienienia) - Writer Zygmunt Sekulowski
- 1981: W biały dzień - Judge
- 1981: Childish Questions (Dziecinne Pytania) - Professor
- 1982: Limuzyna Daimler-Benz - Maks Felinski, Michal's Godfather
- 1983: An Uneventful Story (Nieciekawa historia) - Professor
- 1984: W starym dworku czyli niepodleglosc trójkatów - Tadeusz
- 1985: Zabicie ciotki
- 1985: Write and Fight (Pismak) - Investigator
- 1986: Jezioro Bodenskie - Roullot
- 1986: Siegfried (Zygfryd) - Stefan Drawicz
- 1986: Weryfikacja - Gucio Nawrot
- 1988: Niezwykla podróz Baltazara Kobera - (voice)
- 1989: A Tale of Adam Mickiewicz's 'Forefathers' Eve' (Lawa. Opowiesc o 'Dziadach' Adama Mickiewicza) - Hermit / Ghost / Gustaw-Konrad / Poet
- 1990: The Master and Margarita (Mistrz i Małgorzata) (TV Series) - Woland
- 1994: Oczy niebieskie - Profesor Ani i Jacka
- 1995: Awantura o Basie - Professor Somer
- 1997: Ksiega wielkich zyczen - Adam Ostrowski
- 1999: With Fire and Sword (Ogniem i mieczem) - Senator Kisiel
- 2000: A Very Christmas Story (Świąteczna przygoda) - Good (voice)
- 2001: Listy milosne - Teresa's Father
