= Andrzej Tadeusz Kijowski =

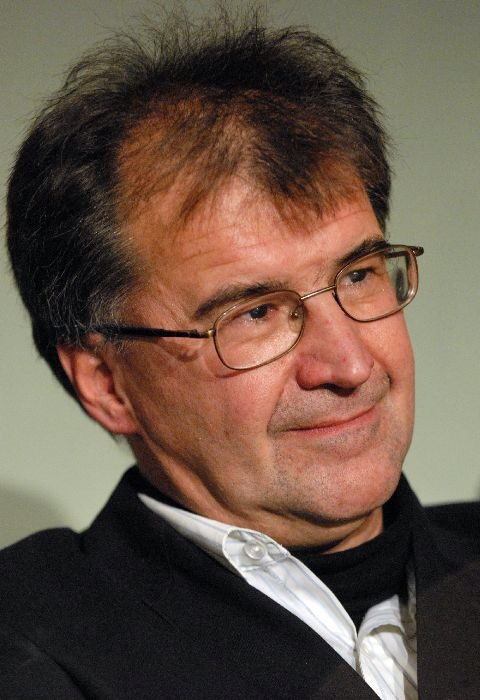
- Kijowski in 2007
- Born: 15 July 1954 (age 72); Kraków, Poland
- Citizenship: Poland
- Education: PhD
- Alma mater: University of Warsaw (1973–1975)
- Occupations: director, poet, author, political activist
- Children: two daughters
- Writing career
- Pen name: KAT
- Genres: poetry, essay
- Notable work: Theatrical trick
- Notable awards: 2016: Special Award of the Minister of Culture and National Heritage for Andrzej Tadeusz Kijowski in recognition of his invaluable contributions to Polish theatrical culture; 2017: Decoration of Honor for activist of anti-communist opposition or repressed person for political reasons; 2022: Commander's Cross of the Polonia Restituta
- Website: www.kijowski.pl

Andrzej Tadeusz Kijowski (born 15 July 1954) is a Polish aesthetician, theatre critic, literary critic, poet and publicist.

== Biography ==
He is son of the writer Andrzej Kijowski. From 1976 to 1989 he participated in the democratic opposition. He cooperated with KOR (Workers' Defence Committee) and NOWa (Independent Printing House). From 1990 to 1994 he helped to create the new self-government.

He worked at Nowa Telewizja and TV Polonia 1 in Warsaw from 1992 to 1995, where he made over 250 television programmes. He is author of the Garden Theatre Competition and the Frascati Gardens arts festival. He is a member of the Polish Writers' Association, the Polish Journalists' Association, and the Freedom of Word Association. From 2017, he is Spokesman on Freedom of the Speech in the Polish "National Broadcasting Council".

== Literary work ==
- Chwyt Teatralny (Theatrical trick); (Wydawnictwo Literackie 1982, ISBN 83-08-00954-9)
- Teoria Teatru (The Theory of Theatre); (Ossolineum 1985, ISBN 83-04-01935-3)
- Separacja.SMS-y poetyckie (Separation, SMS poetics); (published by author 2005, ISBN 83-923292-5-2)
- Opis obyczajów w 15-leciu międzysojuszniczym 1989–2004 (Description of the mores between the two alliances 1989–2004) (AnTraKt Publisher) 2010, vol. I-IV.
  - Odsłanianie Dramatu (Revealing the drama) (vol. I) ISBN 978-83-923292-6-8
  - A Teraz Konkretnie (And now, more precisely) (vol. II) ISBN 978-83-923292-7-5
  - Teatr to miejsce spotkania (The theater is a meeting place) vol. III-IV.
    - Paradoks o Ogródkach (Garden's Paradox) (vol. III) ISBN 978-83-923292-8-2
    - Thea to znaczy widzenie (Thea that is to say the View) (vol. IV) ISBN 978-83-923292-9-9
- Organizacja kultury w społeczeństwie obywatelskim na tle gospodarki rynkowej. Czasy kultury 1789–1989 (Organization of culture in civil society in the context of the market economy. Age of culture 1789–1989)., Warsaw 2015, ISBN 978-83-7543-394-4).Title subsidized by the Polish Ministry of Science and Higher Education.

== Honors ==
- 2017: Decoration of Honor for activist of anti-communist opposition or repressed person for political reasons
- 2022: Commander's Cross of the Polonia Restituta

== See also ==
- List of aestheticians
- List of Polish language poets

== Sources ==
- Who is Who w Polsce (6 edition: ISBN 3-7290-0058-6);Verlag für Personenenzyklopädien AG) – Hübners Who is Who
- Paradoks o ogródkach (Garden's Paradox) – by ROMAN PAWŁOWSKI – Gazeta Wyborcza 27–08.2001
- Polish bibliography 1988 – 2001
