= Hospital of the Transfiguration (film) =

1979 Polish film

- Polish: Szpital Przemienienia
- Directed by: Edward Żebrowski
- Written by: Michał Komar; Edward Żebrowski
- Based on: Hospital of the Transfiguration by Stanisław Lem
- Starring: Piotr Dejmek; Jerzy Bińczycki; Henryk Bista; Ewa Dałkowska; Gustaw Holoubek; Zygmunt Hübner; Ryszard Kotys; Wojciech Pszoniak; Zbigniew Zapasiewicz
- Cinematography: Witold Sobociński
- Edited by: Urszula Śliwińska
- Music by: Stanisław Radwan
- Production company: Tor Studio
- Release date: March 28, 1979
- Running time: 90 minutes
- Country: Poland
- Languages: Polish, German

Hospital of the Transfiguration is a Polish psychological war film from 1979 directed by Edward Żebrowski, based on Stanisław Lem's 1955 novel of the same title. The film's theme revolves around the extermination of patients in a psychiatric hospital shortly after the outbreak of World War II (Aktion T4). The story focuses on the character of Dr. Stefan (played by Piotr Dejmek), who dares to protest against unethical experiments conducted on patients by the hospital staff even before the arrival of the Germans. The film was mostly well received by critics and won multiple awards, including at the Polish Film Festival and the Locarno Film Festival. It was praised for its aesthetic quality and insightful analysis of the reasons for acquiescence to totalitarianism, while its weakness was seen in deviating from wartime realities in favor of an idiosyncratic stylization.

== Plot ==
The action of the film begins in late 1939 when young doctor Stefan arrives at a closed psychiatric hospital to take up a job there. Stefan, who adheres to humanitarian principles but is vague in his views, is accepted by the hospital director, Dr. Pajączkowski. He then gains experience under the supervision of the cynical Dr. Rygier, who does not hide his pro-Nazi views. Stefan disapproves of Rygier's behavior, who subjects patients to humiliating experimental treatment methods, including electroconvulsive therapy. Rygier performs surgery on Andrzej, a brain cancer patient, resulting in the patient almost losing his mental faculties. Stefan also notices the obsessions of other doctors: Dr. Kauters prefers exclusively surgical methods of treatment, while Dr. Marglewski sees mental illness solely as a manifestation of possession.

Soon, an SS officer named Thiesdorf arrives at the hospital, announcing the liquidation of the psychiatric hospital. Thiesdorf's visit provokes various reactions among the hospital staff. Over time, Stefan rebels more and more against Rygier, but he cannot count on Pajączkowski's support, as Rygier accuses him of having a "Masonic" scientific background before the occupation. Pajączkowski admonishes Stefan that he must prioritize not harming the patients over showing them mercy. Meanwhile, the drug-addicted writer Sekułowski, seeking refuge in the hospital, bitterly accuses the young doctor of lacking life experience. Meanwhile, Dr. Nosilewska secretly confesses to Stefan that she fled from Austria after it was occupied by the Nazis. Stefan realizes the futility of his idealism but also witnesses the medical mistakes of his older colleagues: Kauters's failed surgery and Marglewski's charlatanism.

The moment of the hospital's liquidation arrives. The helpless director Pajączkowski cannot obtain consent from Rygier, Kauters, and Marglewski for a spontaneous action to save the patients. Only Stefan supports him, distributing the remaining medicines to the patients and, at Sekułowski's request, adding cyanide to his drink; the files are also burned. When the Germans enter the hospital grounds, they arrest part of the staff; Nosilewska is arrested as a Jew, and Pajączkowski shares her fate. Sekułowski, trying to resist arrest, takes cyanide and commits suicide. The SS officers lead the staff and patients of the hospital out of the building to execute them. Stefan, hiding from the Germans, tries to rescue a young boy hidden under hospital gowns, but the boy dies in his arms. Seeing an SS patrol in the forest, Stefan attempts to flee and disappears into the fog, while the execution squad shoots the patients and remaining staff, burying them afterwards.

== Cast ==
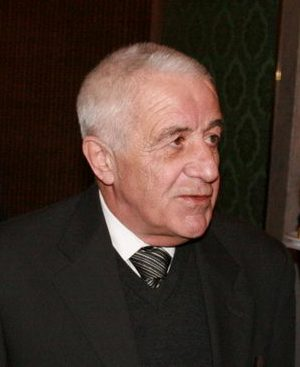
Zbigniew Zapasiewicz, playing the role of Dr. Rygier

Source: Online Polish Film Database

- Piotr Dejmek – Doctor Stefan
- Jerzy Bińczycki – engineer Andrzej Nowacki, hospital patient
- Henryk Bista – Doctor Kauters
- Ewa Dałkowska – Doctor Nosilewska
- Gustaw Holoubek – writer Zygmunt Sekułowski
- Zygmunt Hübner – Doctor Pajączkowski, hospital director
- Ryszard Kotys – Nurse Józef
- Wojciech Pszoniak – Doctor Marglewski
- Zbigniew Zapasiewicz – Doctor Rygier
- Władysław Kowalski – hospital patient
- Elżbieta Karkoszka – hospital patient
- Marcin Troński – Doctor Kozłowski

== Production ==
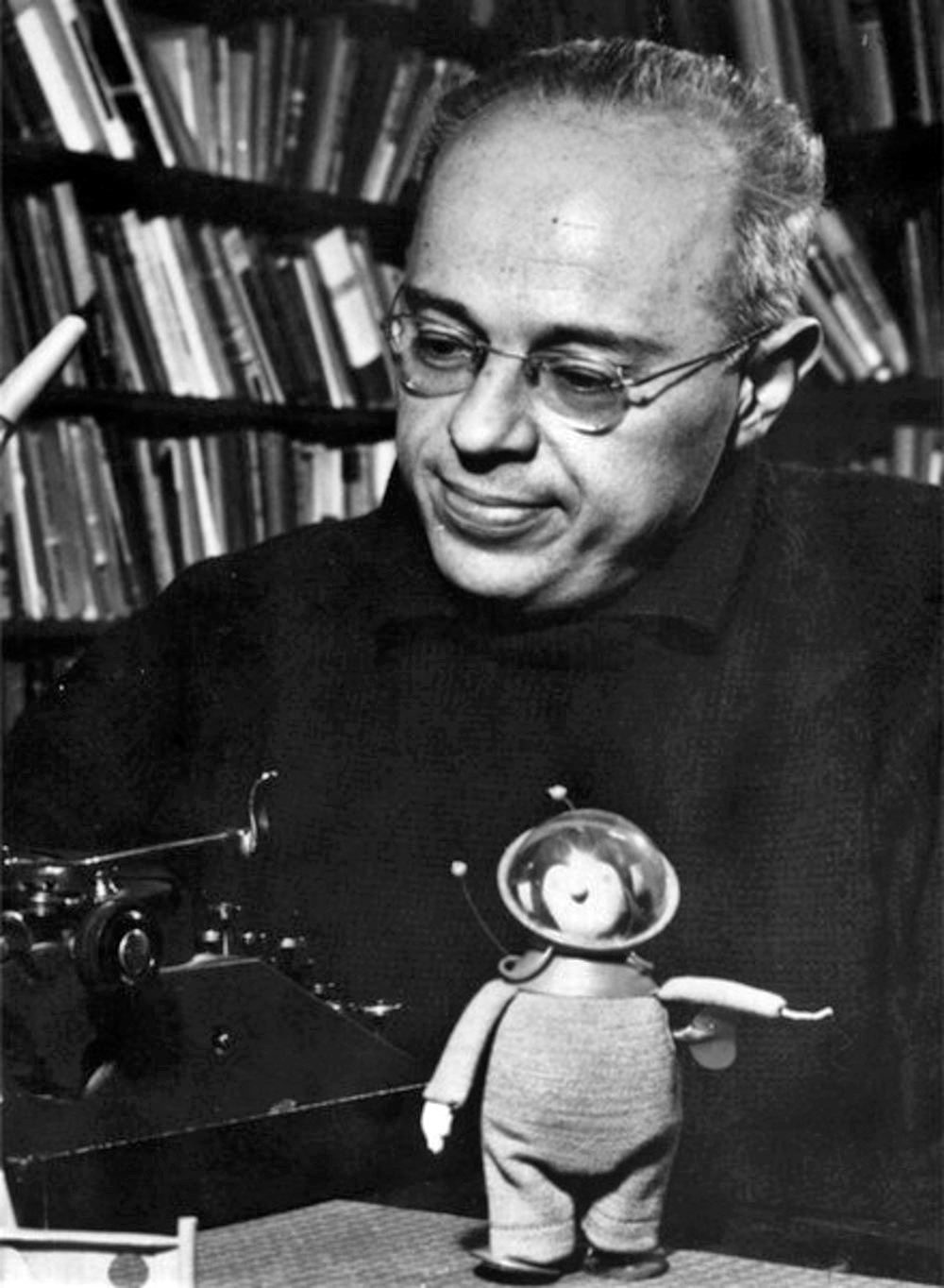
Stanisław Lem, author of the literary original

The production of the Hospital of the Transfiguration was managed by the Tor Studio under the artistic direction of Krzysztof Zanussi. The film was directed by Edward Żebrowski, who co-wrote the screenplay based on Stanisław Lem's novel of the same title with film critic Michał Komar (this was the first screenplay co-created by the latter). Witold Sobociński was responsible for the cinematography, while Tadeusz Wybult designed the set. The music for the Hospital of the Transfiguration was composed by Stanisław Radwan, and Małgorzata Jaworska was in charge of the sound editing. The film was edited by Urszula Śliwińska.

Edward Żebrowski aimed his criticism in the film towards the institution of the psychiatric hospital, which employs a system of violence. By focusing on the moral dilemmas of Dr. Stefan, which lead the main character to a heroic act in the name of good, Żebrowski attempted to simultaneously explore the phenomenon of good in a world permeated by evil.

During the film's production, historic interiors and locations of the Tworkowski Hospital near Warsaw were used. Interestingly, this was the only major psychiatric hospital in Poland where the mentally ill were not exterminated by the Germans during the war. The premiere of the Hospital of the Transfiguration took place on 28 March 1979.

=== Distribution ===
In 2011, the Hospital of the Transfiguration was released together with other films by Żebrowski – Ocalenie (1972) and W biały dzień (1980) – on DVD discs as part of the publishing series Arcydzieła polskiego kina. The release of the Hospital of the Transfiguration was handled by Kino Polska Television, and the distributed version featured Dolby Digital 2.0 sound standard. A digitally reconstructed version of Żebrowski's film was released in 2017 by Tor Studio and Blu Studio, available on both DVD and Blu-ray discs.

== Reception ==
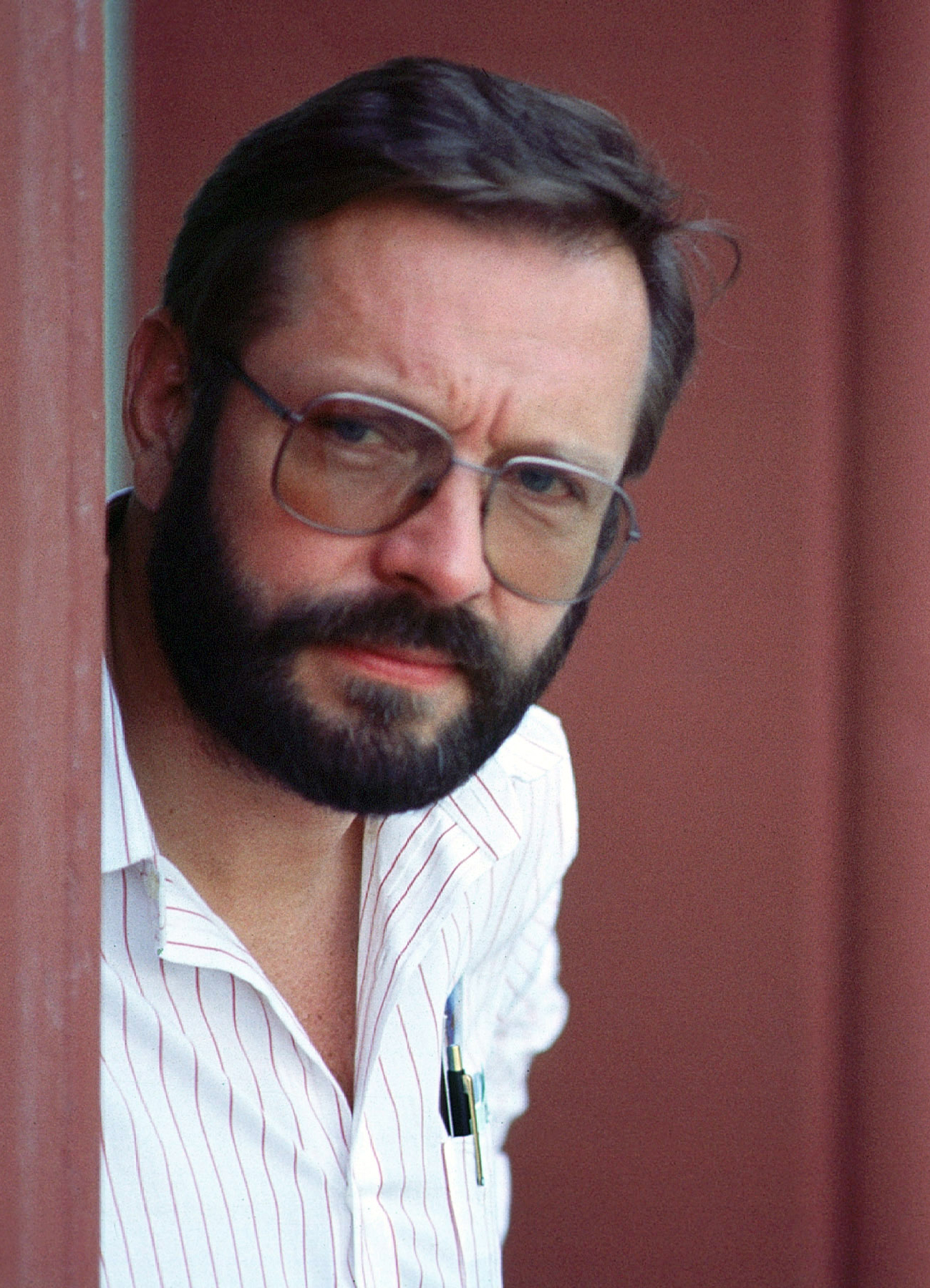
Krzysztof Zanussi, head of the Tor Studio responsible for the production of the film

The Hospital of the Transfiguration was mostly positively received by critics. Krzysztof Kreutzinger, writing for the magazine Film, stated that The Holocaust, although coming from outside, is somehow a consequence of internal relations. There is no significant opposition felt between the perversion within the hospital itself and the impending cruelty. Rafał Marszałek emphasized that Żebrowski discovered the primordial sources of social disease [...] as if beyond Nazism, at least before the extermination planned by the Nazis took place. Marszałek also noted that the film's doctors for a long time feel like masters of life and death of patients, unwittingly laying the groundwork for Nazi extermination. Similarly, Tadeusz Sobolewski wrote that "Hospital of the Transfiguration" shows with corrosive irony that the epidemic of fascism spread also on our side. Among the hospital staff are spiritual Nazis. According to Zygmunt Kałużyński from Polityka, Żebrowski's film fulfills a hugely important need: it presents attitudes, provokes clashes of views, engages us in the drama of ideological contradictions.

More skeptical about the Hospital of the Transfiguration was Tadeusz Lubelski, accusing the film of having an implausible plot. The film's liquidation of the hospital takes place in the summer of 1940, whereas, as Lubelski claimed, the prototype events took place in Lviv, where Lem began his medical studies in 1940; the Germans could only arrive at the hospital two years after the war began. (Note: Gajewska (2016, pp. 81–85) shared a similar view regarding the literary prototype, but according to Morawiec (2017, p. 282), it diverges from the more probable genesis of Lem's novel: the Lviv ghetto is the setting - named and quite literal - in Lem's novella "The Facility". According to Morawiec (2017, pp. 281–283), inspiration for Lem when writing the Hospital of the transfiguration could have come from both the ongoing crimes against patients at the State Institution for the Mentally and Neurologically Ill in Kobierzyn until 1942, as well as the massacre committed on 12 January 1940, at the psychiatric hospital in Chełm.) The author of the literary prototype, Stanisław Lem, accused Żebrowski of departing from the wartime reality: even during World War II, the commander of a German unit could not, just like that, murder anyone. Most likely, the Germans would have killed the patients, but not the doctors, who had a chance of survival. Similar criticism was made by Jerzy Płażewski in Kino, reproaching the director for isolating the hospital story from the broader context of the occupation. Krzysztof Kłopotowski from Literatura stated that "Hospital of the Transfiguration" uses schematic simplifications: the supporter of experimenting on people turns out to be a Volksdeutsche at a critical moment. At the time, it was a valid observation, but today it is misleading.

However, the aesthetic merits of the film were not questioned. Krzysztof Teodor Toeplitz from Miesięcznik Literacki wrote: The film is beautifully shot, its images have realism but also style awareness. In terms of staging, it is undoubtedly a great step forward in the development of Edward Żebrowski's talent. Jan Józef Szczepański from Tygodnik Powszechny pointed out the cinematographic craftsmanship responsible for the cinematography, Witold Sobociński: The unexpected transition from color to black and white technique, the quietening of sound, the blurring of image sharpness, contributes to a general change in tonality, creates a different perspective – as if reality is viewed from a different, more objectified point of view. Szczepański summed up the discussion about Żebrowski's film as follows: "Hospital of the Transfiguration" is not only a great directorial success of Edward Żebrowski – it is also a film that undoubtedly will represent the most valuable achievements of Polish cinematography".

=== Years later ===
Andrzej Szpulak approached the criticism of the film's schematic message from a more contemporary perspective. As Szpulak argued: Kauters, Rygier, Marglewski, or the writer Sekułowski are not wax figures representing their ideological attitudes, but fully-fleshed people with multifaceted personalities. According to Szpulak, the film benefited not only from the subtlety with which Żebrowski adapted Lem's prose but also from the cast of actors. It is largely thanks to their use that the director managed to avoid the risk of flattening the message. Szpulak, considering Żebrowski's entire body of work, emphasized the viewer's confrontation with situations that are difficult or even impossible to comprehend and experience at any moment and for every person, a confrontation devoid of the facilitations associated with the use of conventions or illustrative elements related to some worldview concept. In Szpulak's opinion, the portrayal of a borderline situation in a person's life takes on a nuanced form in the Hospital of the Transfiguration: There is no trace of the beauty of decay or the pornography of violence.

On the other hand, Robert Birkholc considered Lem's criticisms regarding the depiction of wartime realities in the film as not particularly significant because the Hospital of the Transfiguration is not a faithful reconstruction of the Aktion T4 [...], but a symbolic film presenting a bitter diagnosis of European culture. Birkholc also emphasized that: The excellent acting, biting humor, naturalistic scenery, and feverish (in the most dramatic moments of the story) camera work directed by Witold Sobociński make Żebrowski's work one of the best and most suggestive adaptations of Lem's prose.

== Awards ==
Year	Institution	Reward	Recipient
1979	Polish Film Festival	Main Award "Silver Lions of Gdańsk"	Edward Żebrowski
1979	Polish Film Festival	Music Award	Małgorzata Jaworska
1979	Locarno Film Festival	I honorable mention	Edward Żebrowski
1981	Brussels Film Festival	Crystal Star	Piotr Dejmek
1981	International Red Cross and Health Protection Film Festival in Varna	special jury award	Edward Żebrowski

== Bibliography ==
- Gajewska, Agnieszka (2016). Zagłada i gwiazdy. Przeszłość w prozie Stanisława Lema. Poznań: Wydawnictwo Naukowe Uniwersytetu im. Adama Mickiewicza. ISBN 978-83-232-3047-2.
- Lubelski, Tadeusz (2015). Historia kina polskiego 1895–2014. Kraków: Universitas.
- Marszałek, Rafał (2014). "Edward Żebrowski: Redivivus". Dwutygodnik.
- Morawiec, Arkadiusz (2017-12-15). ""Dezynfekcja". Literatura polska wobec eksterminacji osób psychicznie chorych". Przestrzenie Teorii. 27 (27): 261–296. doi:10.14746/pt.2017.27.18. ISSN 2450-5765.
- Sobolewski, Tadeusz (2013). "Piękny dwudziestoletni". Kino. 48 (561). ProQuest 1543482975.
- Socha, Jakub (2018). Żebrowski. Hipnotyzer. Wołowiec: Wydawnictwo Czarne. ISBN 978-83-8049-639-2.
- Szpulak, Andrzej (2011). "Kamera i poeta doctus? O filmach Edwarda Żebrowskiego z perspektywy lotu ptaka". Images. The International Journal of European Film, Performing Arts and Audiovisual Communication. 9 (17–18).
