= Pasja =

1977 film by Stanisław Różewicz

- Directed by: Stanisław Różewicz
- Written by: Andrzej Kijowski, Edward Żebrowski
- Cinematography: Jerzy Wójcik
- Edited by: Urszula Śliwińska
- Music by: Piotr Moss
- Release date: 1978
- Running time: 110 minutes
- Country: Poland
- Language: Polish

Pasja is a Polish historical film directed by Stanisław Różewicz, written by Andrzej Kijowski and Edward Żebrowski. It was released in 1978. The film won Golden Lions award at the Polish Film Festival in Gdańsk in 1978.

== Cast ==
- Piotr Garlicki as Edward Dembowski
- Zbigniew Zapasiewicz as Jan Tyssowski
- Bolesław Smela as Jakub Szela
- Wojciech Alaborski as Wiesiołowski
- Henryk Machalica as Smolka
- Mieczysław Hryniewicz as Walerian Kalinka
- Edmund Fetting as auditor Zajączkowski
- Mieczysław Voit as Wolski
- Józef Fryźlewicz as Teofil Wiśniewski, President of the Court of Galicia
- Paweł Unrug as Szela's man
- Anna Dymna as Magdalena Kaszycka
- Piotr Różański as an associate of Dembowski who criticized his joining the National Government
- Gabriel Nehrebecki as a man in a Kraków salon
- Bogusław Linda as a man in a Kraków salon
- Tomasz Zaliwski as a man in a Kraków salon
- Marcin Troński as a man arresting Dembowski
- Arkadiusz Bazak as Wiesiołowski's associate
