= Czas nieutracony =

Novel by Stanisław Lem

Czas nieutracony (title variously translated as Time Not Wasted, Time Not Lost, or Time Saved) is a trilogy novel of Stanisław Lem in the style of Socialist realism. First published in 1955, it consists of the novels Hospital of the Transfiguration, Among the Dead ("Wśród umarłych"), and Return ("Powrót").

The first volume was finished in 1948, to be published by Gebethner i Wolff publisher, but it was stopped by censorship. Lem recalls endless travels to Warsaw to appease the censors, but eventually he had to add two more "ideologically proper" parts describing happy life of the protagonists in the communist state, and as a result the trilogy was published three times (1955, 1957, and 1965).

Hospital of the Transfiguration, finished in 1948, is a psychodrama about a young doctor, Stefan Trzyniecki, who worked in a psychiatric hospital during the Nazi occupation of Poland in the Second World War.

Among the Dead, finished in 1949, is the story of a young mathematical genius, Karol Wilk, who works in an automobile shop. Professors want to save his talent against the war, but the young man wants to join the resistance. In an interview, Lem says that the story was based on his own experience of the time: after the school he worked in car shops, and had contacts with the underground. In 2005 a part of this book, Operation "Reinhardt", was published in the collection volume Lata czterdzieste. Dyktanda of Lem's complete works, a tale about the Nazi plan for the deportation of Polish Jews into extermination camps and how it was being executed.

The novel Return was finished in 1950. An excerpt from it, Dyżur doktora Trzynieckiego ("Call Duty of Doctor Trzyniecki"), was also published in Lata czterdzieste. Dyktanda (2005). A fragment of this book, Dyżur doktor Trzynieckiego was republished in the 2009 collection Człowiek z Marsa. Opowiadania młodzieńcze. Wiersze. The latter also contained the short story Siostra Barbara (first published in 1953) which was intended to be part of Return. It was reprinted again in the collection Lata czterdzieste. Wiersze. Siostra Barbara. The image of sister Barbara was based on Lem's wife Barbara: "she had a fair fringe of hair on her forehead, stern grey eyes, a mobile nose and an energetic chin".

Since 1975 the novel was no longer published as a trilogy, but in a single-part form under the original title, Hospital of the Transfiguration and without modifications imposed by censorship.
