= Rzeczywistość =

1961 Polish film

Rzeczywistość is a Polish historical film. It was released in 1961.
