= W biały dzień =

1981 Polish historical film

- Directed by: Edward Żebrowski
- Written by: Edward Żebrowski, Władysław Lech Terlecki
- Cinematography: Witold Stok
- Edited by: Łucja Ośko
- Music by: Stanisław Radwan
- Release date: 1981
- Running time: 89 minutes
- Country: Poland
- Language: Polish

W biały dzień is a 1981 Polish historical film directed by Edward Żebrowski, written by Żebrowski and Władysław Lech Terlecki.

== Cast ==
- Michał Bajor as Paweł Świętorzecki Biały
- Krystyna Janda as Ewa, lover of Biały
- Gustaw Holoubek as investigating judge
- Krzysztof Kolberger as Radziejowicz
- Władysław Kowalski as court secretary
- Jan Nowicki as lawyer, Ewa's husband
- Jerzy Radziwiłowicz as Korab
- Jerzy Trela as painter, friend of Korab
- Zbigniew Zapasiewicz as Siwy
- Andrzej Żarnecki as Wroński
- Ryszard Radwański as student killed at the station
- Andrzej Brzeski as a priest in a printing house
- Andrzej Szalawski as presiding judge during the trial of Korab
- Juliusz Machulski as projectionist
- Karol Podgórski
