= Death of a President (1977 film) =

1977 Polish film

- Polish theatrical release poster
- Directed by: Jerzy Kawalerowicz
- Written by: Jerzy Kawalerowicz; Bolesław Michałek
- Starring: Zdzisław Mrożewski; Marek Walczewski; Tomasz Zaliwski
- Cinematography: Jerzy Łukaszewicz; Witold Sobociński
- Edited by: Wiesława Otocka
- Music by: Adam Walaciński
- Production company: KADR
- Release date: 10 October 1977
- Running time: 144 minutes
- Country: Poland
- Language: Polish

Death of a President (Polish: Śmierć prezydenta) is a 1977 Polish drama film directed by Jerzy Kawalerowicz. It was entered into the 28th Berlin International Film Festival, where it won the Silver Bear for an outstanding artistic contribution. The film was also selected as the Polish entry for the Best Foreign Language Film at the 51st Academy Awards, but was not accepted as a nominee.

The film depicts the 1922 assassination of the first President of Poland Gabriel Narutowicz by artist and Endecja sympathizer Eligiusz Niewiadomski.

== Cast ==
- Zdzisław Mrożewski as president Gabriel Narutowicz
- Marek Walczewski as painter Eligiusz Niewiadomski
- Henryk Bista as priest Marceli Nowakowski
- Czesław Byszewski as Prime Minister Julian Nowak
- Jerzy Duszyński as marshall Józef Piłsudski
- Edmund Fetting as general Józef Haller
- Kazimierz Iwor as Herman Lieberman
- Julian Jabczyński as count Stefan Przezdziecki
- Zbigniew Kryński as Stanisław Thugutt
- Leszek Kubanek as Norbert Barlicki
- Włodzimierz Saar as Stanisław Stroński
- Jerzy Sagan as Wincenty Witos
- Janusz Sykutera as Stanisław Car
- Tomasz Zaliwski as Maciej Rataj
- Teodor Gendera as Marian Zyndram-Kościałkowski

== See also ==
- List of submissions to the 51st Academy Awards for Best Foreign Language Film
- List of Polish submissions for the Academy Award for Best Foreign Language Film
