= Zdzisław Mrożewski =

Polish actor

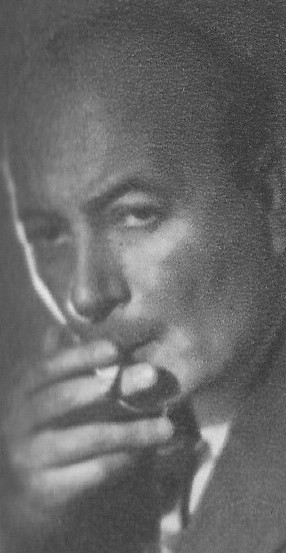
- Born: 21 May 1909; Włocławek, Congress Poland
- Died: 5 July 2002 (aged 93); Warsaw, Poland
- Occupation: Actor
- Years active: 1932–1981

Zdzisław Mrożewski (21 May 1909 – 5 July 2002) was a Polish actor. He appeared in 30 films between 1932 and 1981. He starred in the 1977 film Death of a President, which was entered into the 28th Berlin International Film Festival, where it won the Silver Bear for an outstanding artistic contribution.

== Partial filmography ==
- Ulani, ulani, chlopcy malowani (1932)
- Warsaw Premiere (1951) - Count Alfred
- Niedaleko Warszawy (1954) - Engineer Antoni Przewlocki
- Podhale w ogniu (1956) - Gadra
- Farewells (1958) - Pawel's Father
- Rok pierwszy (1960) - dziedzic Woloka
- Rzeczywistosc (1961)
- Dzis w nocy umrze miasto (1961) - Professor
- Swiadectwo urodzenia (1961) - Doctor Orzechowski (segment "Kropla krwi")
- Drugi czlowiek (1961)
- Glos z tamtego swiata (1962) - Professor Choberski, Urszula's Father
- Pevnost na Rýne (1962) - General Gordon
- Glos ma prokurator (1965)
- Westerplatte (1967) - Lt. Col. Wincenty Sobociński
- Czerwone i zlote (1969) - Jan Nepomucen Pozarski
- Epilog norymberski (1971) - David Maxwell Fife
- Dzieciol (1971) - Tylski
- Boleslaw Smialy (1972) - Kanclerz Radosz
- The Story of Sin (1975) - Mr. Pobratynski
- Nights and Days (1975) - Leon Woynarowski
- Zofia (1976) - Wladyslaw
- Death of a President (1977) - Gabriel Narutowicz
- Sprawa Gorgonowej (1977) - Gasiorowski
- Granica (1978) - Walerian Ziembiewicz, Zenon's father
- Mephisto (1981) - Bruckner, tanácsos
- Polonia Restituta (1981) - Arthur Balfour
