= Edward Żebrowski =

Polish film director (1935–2014)

- Born: 26 July 1935
- Died: 13 February 2014 (aged 78)
- Occupations: Film director, screenwriter

Edward Żebrowski, born Edward Bernstein (26 July 1935 – 13 February 2014) was a film director and screenwriter.

== Biography ==
In 1965 he graduated from the Directing Department of the National Film, Television and Theatre School in Łódź.

== Filmography ==
=== As director ===
Year	Film
1972	Ocalenie (film)
1978	Hospital of the Transfiguration
1980	W biały dzień

=== As screenwriter ===
- Pasja (1977)

== Accolades ==
- Silver Lions at the Polish Film Festival for Hospital of the Transfiguration (1981)

== Bibliography ==
- Socha, Jakub (2018). Żebrowski. Hipnotyzer. Wołowiec: Czarne. ISBN 978-83-8049-622-4.
