= Jerzy Kawalerowicz =

Polish film director, screenwriter and politician

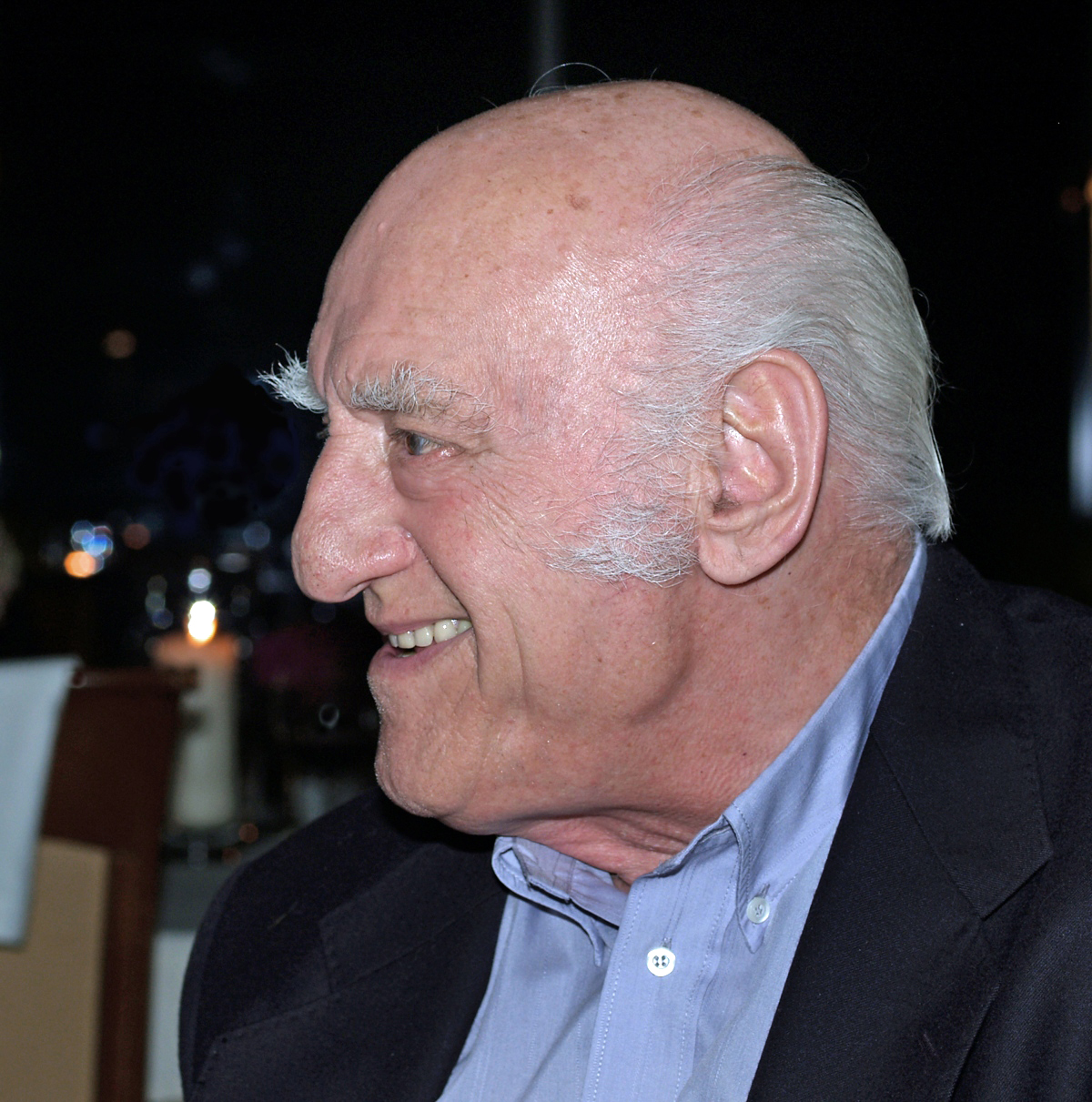
- Kawalerowicz in 2006
- Born: 19 January 1922; Gwoździec, Poland, (now Hvizdets, Ukraine)
- Died: 27 December 2007 (aged 85); Warsaw, Poland
- Occupations: Film director Screenwriter
- Years active: 1952–2001
- Political party: PZPR

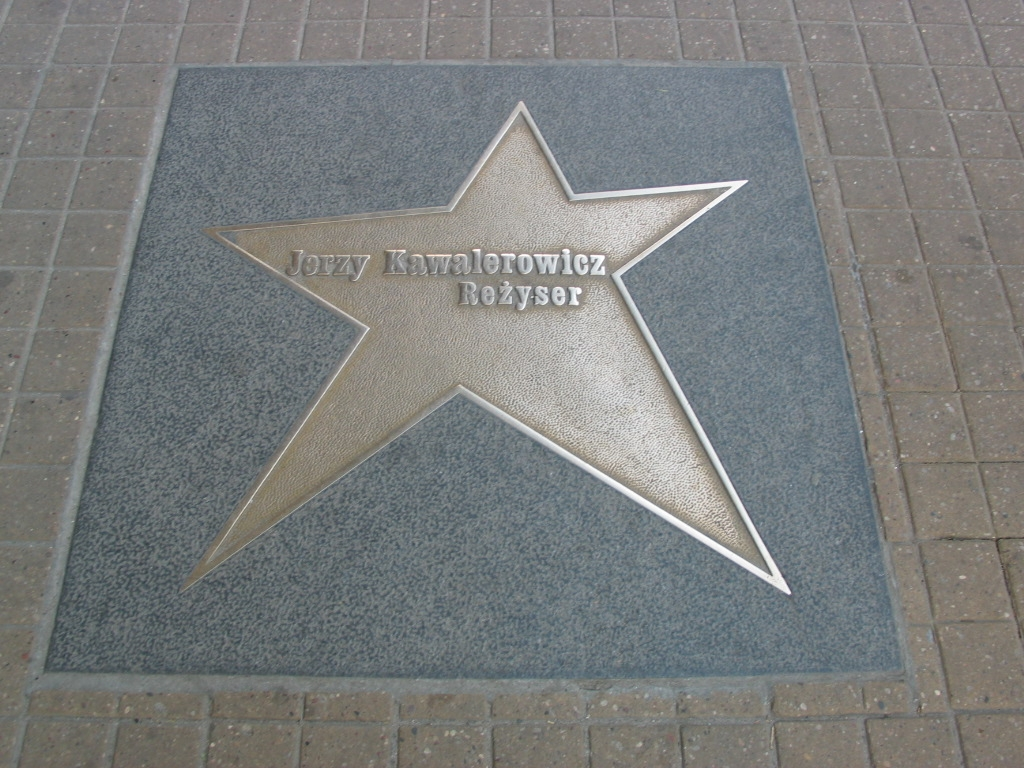
Kawalerowicz's star on the Łódź Walk of Fame

Jerzy Franciszek Kawalerowicz (19 January 1922 – 27 December 2007) was a Polish film director, screenwriter and politician, having been a member of the Polish United Workers' Party from 1954 until its dissolution in 1990 and a deputy in the Polish parliament from 1985 to 1989.

== Life and career ==
Kawalerowicz was born in Gwoździec, Poland, as one of the few Poles living in an ethnically-mixed Ukrainian and Jewish town. Kawalerowicz's father's family originated from Armenia, originally having the surname Kavalarian. Jerzy Kawalerowicz was noted for his powerful, detail-oriented imagery and the depth of ideas in his films. After working as an assistant director, he made his directorial debut with the 1951 film The Village Mill (Gromada). He was a leading figure in the Polish Film School, and his films Shadow (Cień, 1956) and Night Train (Pociąg, 1959) constitute some of that movement's best work.

Other noted works by Kawalerowicz include Mother Joan of the Angels (Matka Joanna od Aniołów, 1961) for which he was awarded the Jury Prize at the 1961 Cannes Film Festival, and a 1966 adaptation of Bolesław Prus' historical novel, Pharaoh (Faraon), which was nominated for the Academy Award for Best Foreign Language Film.

In 1955 Kawalerowicz was appointed head of the prestigious KADR production unit. He held that position again in 1972. He always resisted pressures from the communist administration to produce propaganda films. His studio produced some of the best Polish films by Andrzej Wajda, Tadeusz Konwicki and Juliusz Machulski.

In 1969 he was a member of the jury at the 6th Moscow International Film Festival. In 1975 he was a member of the jury at the 9th Moscow International Film Festival. In 1976 he was the head of the jury at the 26th Berlin International Film Festival. Two years later, his film Death of a President won the Silver Bear for an outstanding artistic contribution at the 1978 festival. At the 11th Moscow International Film Festival he was a member of the jury and was awarded with the Honourable Prize for the contribution to cinema.

== Death ==
He died on 27 December 2007 in Warsaw. His last film, Quo Vadis, had the largest budget for a Polish movie as of 2011.

== Selected filmography ==
- The Village Mill (Gromada, 1952)
- Celuloza (1953) by novel of Igor Newerly
- Under the Phrygian Star (Pod gwiazdą frygijską, 1954)
- Shadow (Cień, 1956)
- The Real End of the Great War (Prawdziwy koniec wielkiej wojny, 1957)
- Night Train (Pociąg, 1959)
- Mother Joan of the Angels (Matka Joanna od Aniołów , 1961) by short story of Jarosław Iwaszkiewicz
- Pharaoh (Faraon, 1966) by novel of Bolesław Prus
- The Game (Gra, 1968)
- Maddalena (1971)
- Death of a President (Śmierć prezydenta , 1977)
- Encounter on the Atlantic (Spotkanie na Atlantyku, 1980)
- Austeria (The Inn) (1983) by novel of Julian Stryjkowski
- The Hostage of Europe (Jeniec Europy, 1989) by novel of Juliusz Dankowski
- Bronstein's Children (Bronsteins Kinder, 1991)
- Why? (Za co?, 1995) by short story of Leo Tolstoy
- Quo Vadis? (2001) by novel by Henryk Sienkiewicz

== See also ==
- List of Poles
- Cinema of Poland
