= Union of Polish Stage Artists =

Polish union established in 1918

- ZASP; Stowarzyszenie Polskich Artystów Teatru, Filmu, Radia i Telewizji
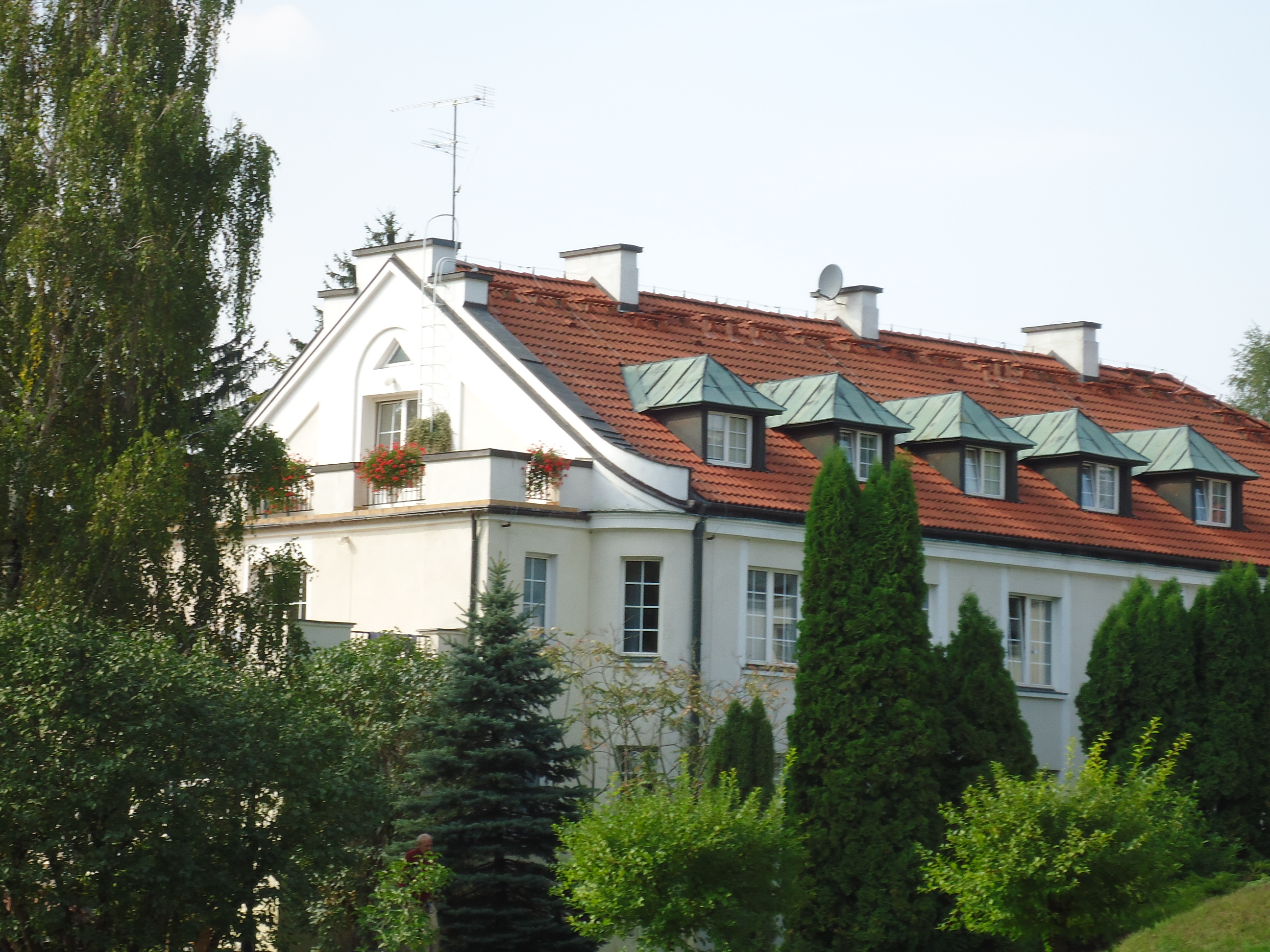
- Formation: 21 December 1918 6 September 2002
- Headquarters: Konstancin-Jeziorna
- Location: Polska
- Leader: Krzysztof Szuster
- Website: http://www.zasp.pl/

Union of Polish Stage Artists (Związek Artystów Scen Polskich ZASP – Stowarzyszenie) is a Polish union established 21 December 1918, during Constitutional Congress in Rozmaitości Theater in Warsaw. First chair was Józef Śliwicki. The statute of the Union was signed, among others, by: Stefan Jaracz, Juliusz Osterwa and Aleksander Zelwerowicz.

== History ==
In the interwar period, ZASP became one of the most dynamic labor organizations in Poland. Thanks to the so-called organizational coercion established by ZASP, theaters had employ only union members, and belonging to ZASP was compulsory for professional actors. ZASP also led to the signing of the contract, which guaranteed the actors the height of the minimum garage throughout the season. In 1928, the union built the House of Veterans of Polish Scenes in Skolimów. In 1976 ZASP joined International Federation of Actors. In 1932 it led to the creation of the first modern theater school in Poland – the State Institute of Theater Art.

During WW2 ZASP became a conspirational organization. In 1940 they issued a ban on participating in artistic events organized by the Germans. Most of the acting environment observed the ban.

In 1950 ZASP was dissolved and replaced with Stowarzyszenie Polskich Artystów Teatru i Filmu (SPATiF, Association of Polish Theatre and Film Artists). In 1952 name was changed to SPATiF-ZASP. In 1981 they returned to the pre-war name. 1 December 1982 ZASP was dissolved by the authorities, and replaced on 19 December 1983 with "new" ZASP, which was joined by 1/5 members of the previous union. In 1989 two unions were joined.

Ministry of Culture 1 February 1995 issued permission for ZASP forcollective copyright management of theater directors and theater stage designers in the following fields of operation: preservartion, multiplication by any technique, introducing to the market, lending, renting, public performance, displaying, playing, broadcasting, re-broadcasting, making the work publicly available in such a way that everyone can access it at a place and time of their choice.

The permit also covers the management of related rights of performers: actors, soloists, singers, dancers (including the right to collect remuneration) in the fields of exploitation: recording, multiplication by any technique, marketing, lending, rental, broadcasting, re-broadcasting, reproduction, making available to the public artistic fixation in such a way that everyone can have access to it in a place and at a time chosen by them.

The Union also collects remuneration for displaying an audiovisual work in cinemas, renting copies of audiovisual works and their public broadcast, and broadcasting an audiovisual work on television or through other means of making works available to the public.

== Controversies ==
In 2001, Kazimierz Kaczor (then president of ZASP) and Cezary Morawski (then treasurer of ZASP; in 2005, the Main Board of ZASP deprived Morawski of membership in the association) exposed the union to over PLN 9.2 million in losses, but were acquitted in 2011i. The court dismissed all appeals, both the defendants and the prosecutor's, found the defendants guilty, while conditionally discontinuing the proceedings for a probationary period of one year, because the actions of the defendants were the result of a violation of the principles of prudence and not intentional action, and noted that no one is alleging fraud, and their the fault was unintentional; the judgment is final.

Irregularities with the investment of money from unclaimed royalties caused a scandal (2002) that led to the withdrawal of many artists from the union. Some of them formed a competing organization: Stowarzyszenie Artystów Filmu i Telewizji (Association of Artists of Film and Television). The final judgment in this case was an important issue during the competition procedure, which in September 2016 led to the selection of Cezary Morawski as the director of the Teatr Polski in Wrocław.

September 2018 reporters of TVN24 revealed that one of the rooms at the headquarters of the Union of Polish Stage Artists was made available to the founder of the Academic Theater of the University of Warsaw, who during rehearsals sexually harassed female high school and university students playing in his productions.

== ZASP chairs ==
- 1919–1920 – Józef Śliwicki
- 1920–1921 – Józef Kotarbiński
- 1921–1924 – Józef Śliwicki
- 1924–1926 – Tadeusz Mazurkiewicz
- 1926–1929 – Józef Śliwicki
- 1929–1930 – Jerzy Bojanowski
- 1930–1932 – Ignacy Dygas
- 1932–1933 – Robert Boelke
- 1933–1944 – Józef Śliwicki
- 1945–1948 – Dobiesław Damięcki
- 1948–1949 – Feliks Chmurkowski
- 1950–1954 – Leon Schiller
- 1954–1955 – Marian Wyrzykowski p.o.
- 1955–1957 – Wojciech Brydziński
- 1957–1959 – Marian Wyrzykowski
- 1959–1961 – Henryk Szletyński
- 1961–1963 – Jan Kreczmar
- 1963–1965 – Henryk Szletyński
- 1965–1970 – Władysław Krasnowiecki
- 1970–1981 – Gustaw Holoubek
- 1981–1982 – Andrzej Szczepkowski
- 1983–1985 – Henryk Szletyński
- 1985–1988 – Tadeusz Jastrzębowski
- 1988–1989 – Kazimierz Dejmek
- 1989–1996 – Andrzej Łapicki
- 1996–2002 – Kazimierz Kaczor
- 2002–2005 – Olgierd Łukaszewicz
- 2005–2006 – Ignacy Gogolewski
- 2006–2010 – Krzysztof Kumor
- 2010 – Joanna Szczepkowska
- 2011–2018 – Olgierd Łukaszewicz
- 2018–2020 – Paweł Królikowski
- Since 2020 – Krzysztof Szuster

Sourced from ZASP page.

== External sources ==
- Official website of ZASP
- ZASP in National Court Register
