= Kijowski =

Kijowski is a Polish masculine surname, its feminine counterpart is Kijowska. It may refer to

- Andrzej Kijowski (1928–1985), Polish literary critic, essayist and screenwriter
- Andrzej Tadeusz Kijowski (born 1954), Polish aesthetician and critic
- Jerzy Juliusz Kijowski (born 1943), Polish physicist
- Mateusz Kijowski (born 1968), Polish IT specialist, journalist, social activist and blogger
- Renata Kijowska (born 1975), Polish journalist
