= Wyrzykowski =

Wyrzykowski (feminine: Wyrzykowska; plural: Wyrzykowscy) is a Polish surname. Notable people with the surname include:

- Antonina Wyrzykowska (1916–2011), Polish Righteous Among the Nations honoree
- Juliusz Wyrzykowski (1946–2002), Polish actor
- Marian Wyrzykowski (1904–1970), Polish actor
