= Jezioro Bodeńskie =

1986 Polish film

- Directed by: Janusz Zaorski
- Written by: Stanisław Dygat; Janusz Zaorski
- Based on: Jezioro Bodeńskie by Stanisław Dygat
- Starring: Krzysztof Pieczyński
- Cinematography: Witold Adamek
- Edited by: Halina Prugar-Ketling
- Music by: Jerzy Satanowski
- Release date: 5 September 1986 (Poland)
- Running time: 82 minutes
- Country: Poland
- Language: Polish

Jezioro Bodeńskie (English: Lake Constance) is a 1986 Polish film directed by Janusz Zaorski. It won the Golden Leopard at the 1986 Locarno International Film Festival.

== Synopsis ==
The film tells the story of a Polish man who spent time in an internment camp during the Second World War, in the city of Konstanz, on the Swiss-German border. Many years later, he revisits the location and meets other internees he knew there, including several women with whom he had romantic affairs.

== Cast ==
- Krzysztof Pieczyński as the protagonist
- Małgorzata Pieczyńska as Suzanne
- Joanna Szczepkowska as Janka
- Maria Pakulnis as Renee Bleist
- Gustaw Holoubek as Roullot
- Andrzej Szczepkowski as Thomson
- Henryk Borowski as Wildermayer
- Krzysztof Zaleski as Harry Markowski
- Krzysztof Gosztyła as MacKinley
- Wojciech Wysocki as Vilbert
- Jacek Sas-Uhrynowski as Cleont
- Krzysztof Kowalewski as Pociejak
- Jan Kociniak as Klaus
- Janusz Bukowski as Max Pfitzner
- Adam Ferency as Jasiek Paluch
- Grzegorz Wons as Jean Ledoix
- Krzyś Paszkowski sa Krupski
- Wojciech Paszkowski as Krupski
