= Janusz Kijowski =

Polish film director (born 1948)

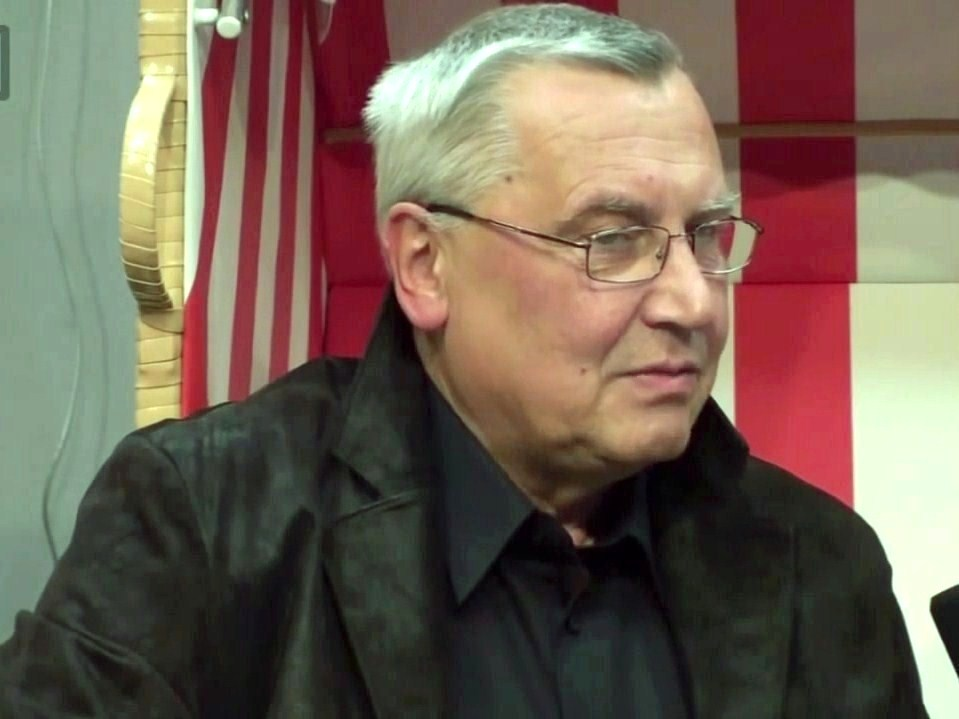
- Janusz Kijowski, 2010
- Born: 14 December 1948 (age 77)
- Occupations: Film director, theatre director, screenwriter
- Years active: 1974–present

Janusz Józef Kijowski (born 14 December 1948) is a film and theatre director, screenwriter, film producer and academic teacher.

== Biography ==
The son of Józef Kijowski, brother of Jerzy Juliusz Kijowski.

In 1966 he passed matura in the 6th Tadeusz Reytan High School in Warsaw. In 1972 he graduated from the Faculty of History at the University of Warsaw. During his studies, he worked as a film critic for the “Kultura” (weekly). In 1978 he graduated in film directing from the National Film School in Łódź.

Since 1983, he has lectured at the Institut National Superieur des Arts du Spectacle in Brussels, and since 1998 at the National Film School in Łódź. He also taught at the University of Warmia and Mazury in Olsztyn. In 2000 he obtained doctorate and in 2003 he obtained habilitation in film art.

He served as vice-president of the Polish Filmmakers Association (SFP) for several years (until 2016) and became its honorary vice-president in 2016. From 2016 to 2022, he was a member of the SFP Management Board. In 2002, he was elected vice-president of the Federation of European Screen Directors (FERA). From 2005 to 2008, he was a member of the Council of the Polish Film Institute. He was chosen aember of the European Film Academy (EFA). From 2004 to 2018, he was the director of the Stefan Jaracz Theatre in Olsztyn. His contract was not extended because the State Labour Inspection (PIP) confirmed the allegations made against him by trade unions regarding violations of labour law and discrimination based on union membership.

He was program director of the Koszaliński Festiwal Debiutów Filmowych "Młodzi i Film".

His children are actress Julia Kijowska and cinematographer Jakub Kijowski, his nephew is Mateusz Kijowski.

== Filmography ==
=== Director ===
- Indeks. Życie i twórczość Józefa M. (1977)
- Kung-fu (film) (1979)
- Głosy (1980)
- Avant la bataille (1982)
- Maskarada (film) (1987)
- Stan strachu (1989)
- Warszawa. Année 5703 (1992)
- Kameleon (2001)

=== Producer ===
- Pułapka (1997)
- Warszawa (film) (2003)

== Accolades ==
- Silver Cross of Merit (2009)
- Knight's Cross of the Order of Polonia Restituta (2014)
- Polish Filmmakers Association Award “for outstanding artistic achievements and contribution to the development of Polish cinematography” (2022)
- Medal “For Merit to Koszalin” (2022)
