= Dekalog: Three =

1989 film from cycle directed by Krzysztof Kieślowski

- Directed by: Krzysztof Kieślowski
- Written by: Krzysztof Kieślowski; Krzysztof Piesiewicz
- Produced by: Ryszard Chutkovski
- Starring: Daniel Olbrychski; Maria Pakulnis; Joanna Szczepkowska
- Cinematography: Piotr Sobociński
- Edited by: Ewa Smal
- Music by: Zbigniew Preisner
- Distributed by: Polish Television
- Release date: September 1989 (Venice)
- Running time: 56 minutes
- Country: Poland
- Language: Polish
- Budget: $10,000

Dekalog: Three (Polish: Dekalog, trzy) is the third part of Dekalog, the drama series of films directed by Polish director Krzysztof Kieślowski for television, possibly connected to the fourth and seventh imperatives of the Ten Commandments: "Remember the Sabbath day, to keep it holy" and "Thou shalt not commit adultery".

The ten-part Dekalog series was exhibited in its entirety at the 46th Venice International Film Festival in September 1989, in the Special Events section. Dekalog: Seven premiered on Polish Television on 18 May 1990.

== Plot ==
It is Christmas Eve. Janusz (Daniel Olbrychski), a taxicab driver, plays Święty Mikołaj (roughly equivalent to Santa Claus) for his children and then comes home as himself (crossing paths briefly with Krzysztof from Dekalog: One) to his wife and children, in order to spend the evening with them. They attend mass in the city. There he spots Ewa (Maria Pakulnis), with whom he had an affair three years earlier. Ewa just happened upon the church after visiting her senile aunt in the retirement home (the confused aunt asks Ewa whether she's done her homework, but also enquires after her husband).

Ewa later comes to Janusz's place looking for her ex-lover, asking him to help her find her husband, who she says has disappeared. Janusz leaves his house saying that his taxi has been stolen, although his wife (Joanna Szczepkowska) suspects something and suggests he leave it alone. Janusz answers that the taxi is their sole source of income and leaves. Janusz and Ewa spend the whole night driving around the city, discussing past and present. Janusz is eager to go home and be with his family on Christmas evening, but Ewa is desperate and manages to keep him with her by setting up clues along the way to track her husband down. They inquire in hospitals and at the train station. Eventually Janusz sees through her game but does not say anything.

When the clock strikes seven the next morning, Ewa reveals that she has been lying to Janusz. She is no longer with her husband; they divorced right after her tryst with Janusz, and he has been living with his new family in Kraków for the past three years. She is now forced to face the holidays all alone while watching other families share the love and peace that she does not have. Ewa reveals that she had set up a scheme in her mind - if she succeeded in her "game" keeping Janusz away from his family till 7am, all would be well again. If not, she would commit suicide. They part at dawn, with Janusz returning to his family and Ewa to her loneliness. When Janusz gets home, his suspecting wife asks him whether he has restarted his affair with Ewa. He promises never to see her again.

== Theme ==
The film explores characters facing one or several moral or ethical dilemmas as they live in a large housing project in Poland in the 1980s. The themes can be interpreted in many different ways; however, each film has its own literality:

| Commandment (Roman Catholic Enumeration) | Ideal | Kieślowskian Theme |
|---|---|---|
| Remember the Sabbath day, to keep it holy. | The sanctity of time | Time designations (holidays, day/night etc.) as repositories of meaning |

== Cast ==
- Daniel Olbrychski - Janusz
- Maria Pakulnis - Ewa
- Joanna Szczepkowska - Janusz's wife
- Artur Barciś - tram-driver
- Krystyna Drochocka - aunt
- Krzysztof Kumor - doctor
- Henryk Baranowski - Krzysztof
- Jacek Kalucki - policeman

Actors from other episodes playing different roles:

- Zygmunt Fok, Jacek Kalucki, Barbara Kolodziejska, Maria Krawczyk, Jerzy Zygmunt Nowak, Piotr Rzymszkiewicz, Wlodzimierz Rzeczycki, Wlodzimierz Musial
