= Krzysztof Zaleski =

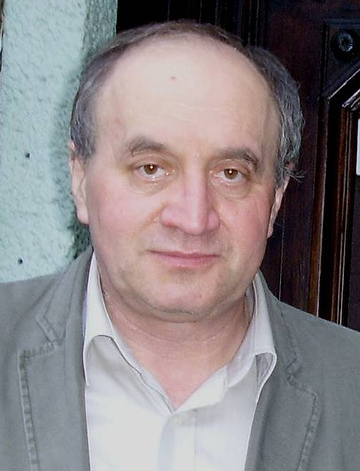
Krzysztof Zaleski

Krzysztof Zaleski (September 3, 1948 – October 20, 2008) was a Polish theater director and cinema actor.

Zaleski was born in Świętochłowice, Poland, on September 3, 1948. He graduated from Warsaw University's Department of Polish Studies in 1971. He further completed his studies at the State Higher Theatre School in Warsaw in 1986.

He received numerous awards throughout his career for his work within the Warsaw theater community. In 2007, Zaleski was awarded the Feliks’ Award for his adaptation of series of short stories originally written by Marek Nowakowski.

Zaleski worked as the Director of Polish Radio Drama. Additionally, he served as the director of Director of Polish Radio 2 for the last 18 months of his life.

Krzysztof Zaleski died on October 20, 2008, in Warsaw at the age of 59 after a long illness. He was survived by his wife, Polish actress Maria Pakulnis, and their son.

== Filmography ==
- 1976: Niedzielne dzieci
- 1977: Indeks. Życie i twórczość Józefa M.
- 1978: Zaległy urlop
- 1978: Próba ognia i wody
- 1978: Bez znieczulenia
- 1979: Szansa
- 1980: Gorączka
- 1980: Głosy
- 1981: Kobieta samotna
- 1981: Przypadek
- 1981: Dziecinne pytania
- 1981: Człowiek z żelaza
- 1985: Idol
- 1985: Jezioro Bodeńskie
- 1985: Kochankowie mojej mamy
- 1985: Zabawa w chowanego
- 1986: Zmiennicy - serial telewizyjny
- 1987: O rany, nic się nie stało!!!
- 1987: Zabij mnie glino
- 1987: The Mother of Kings
- 1988: Męskie sprawy
- 1988: Obywatel Piszczyk
- 1989: Konsul
- 1991: Life for Life: Maximilian Kolbe
- 1992: Czarne słońca
- 1992: Warszawa. Rok 5703
- 1992: Tragarz puchu
- 1993: Tylko strach
- 1993: Samowolka
- 1994: Miasto prywatne
- 1995: Gracze
- 1996: Ekstradycja 2
- 1997: Sztos
- 1999: O dwóch takich, co nic nie ukradli
- 2000: Bajland
- 2004: Cudownie ocalony
- 2005: Dziki 2: Pojedynek
- 2006: Letnia miłość
- 2008: Drugi sztos
