= Sword of God =

Sword of God may refer to:

- Sword of God (novel), 2007 novel by Chris Kuzneski
- Sword of God (film), 2018 Polish film
- The Sword of God (album), a 2001 album by Quasi
- "The Sword of God" (novelette), a 1996 novelette by Russell Blackford

== See also ==
- Saifullah, an Arabic name meaning "sword of God"
