= Stanisław Jaśkiewicz =

Polish actor

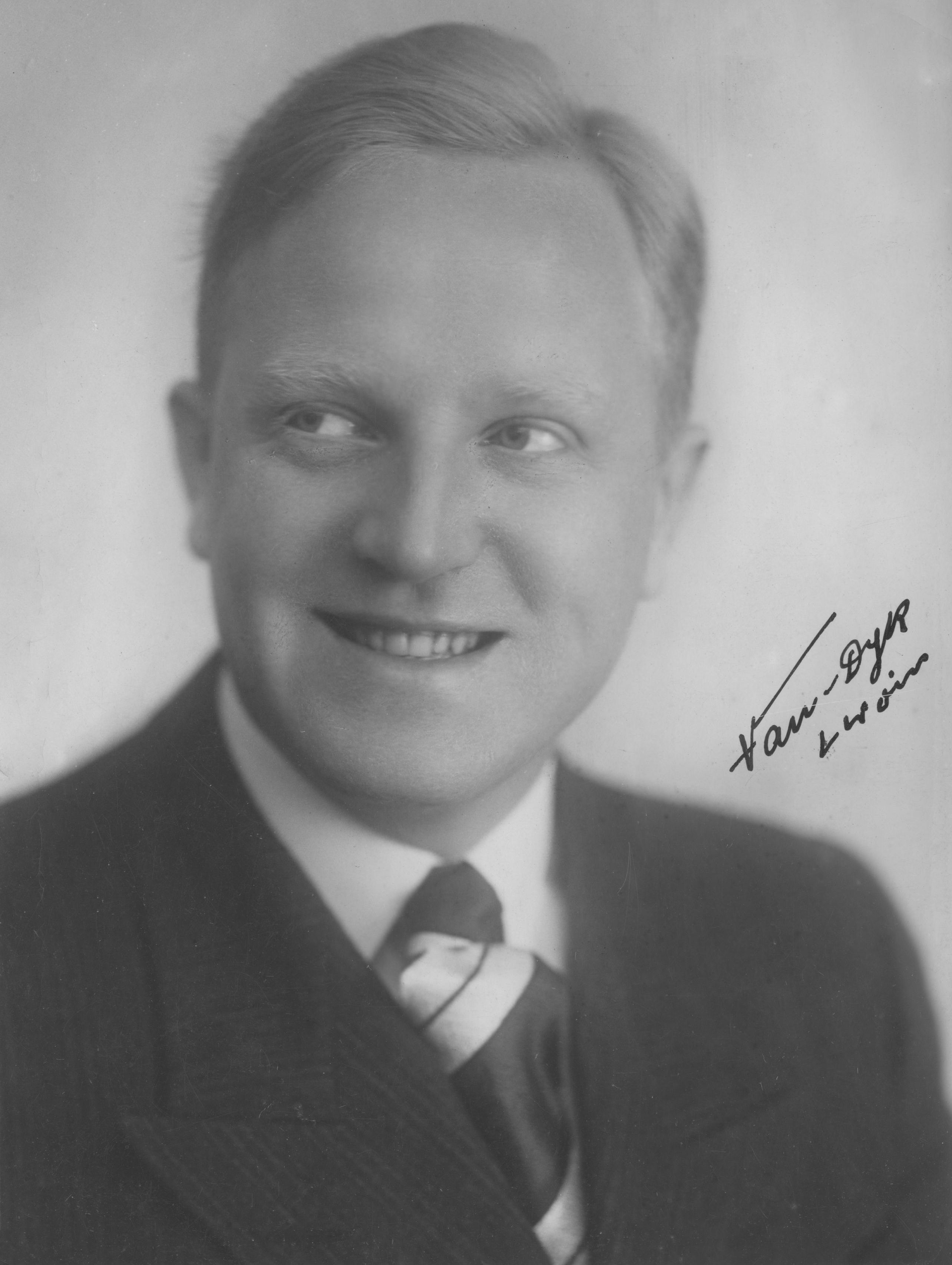
- Born: January 12, 1907; Liepāja, Russian Empire
- Died: December 21, 1980 (aged 73); Warsaw, Poland
- Occupation: Actor

Stanisław Jaśkiewicz (12 January 1907 – 21 December 1980) was a Polish actor.

== Biography ==
Jaśkiewicz was born on 12 January 1907 in Liepāja, Russian Empire. He graduated from the Warsaw Conservatory in 1929, making his theatrical debut at 21 November that year as Francis Flute in the Vilnius Municipal Theatre production of A Midsummer Night's Dream. Along the years, he was part of the regular cast in the Warsaw Elizeum Theatre (at 1931), the Lemberg Municipal Theatre (from 1932 to 1938), the Pohulanka Theatre in Warsaw (1938–1941), the Łódź Soldiers' House Theatre (1946–1947), the Zygmunt Hübner Theatre in Warsaw (1947–1949), the Modernist Warsaw Theatre (1949–1957) and the Polish Theatre (1957–1975). In 1963 he was awarded the Officer's Cross of the Order of Polonia Restituta.

He first appeared on screen at the 1937 movie Flaming Heart (Płomienne serca), as the student-turned-soldier Wojtek. He played in more than thirty movies and television productions until his departure.

He died on 21 December 1980 in Warsaw, Poland.

== Filmography ==
Year	Title	Role	Notes
1937	Plomienne serca	Wojciech Cietrzewa	
1953	Żołnierz zwycięstwa	Minor Role	Uncredited
1954	Domek z kart	Felicjan Skladkowski-Slawoj	
1958	Wolne miasto	Postman	
1960	Knights of the Teutonic Order	Castellan of Kraków	
1962	Spóznieni przechodnie	Erwin, Ala's Father	(segment "Krag istnienia"), Uncredited
1963	Pamietnik pani Hanki	Man	Uncredited
1965	Kapitan Sowa na tropie	Professor Sandecki	
1967	Paryz - Warszawa bez wizy		
1971	Epilog norymberski	defendant	
1971	Liberation	Franklin Delano Roosevelt	
1974	Zaczarowane podwórko		
1974	Pomni imya svoye	Dyrektor muzeum w Oswiecimiu	
1976	Kazimierz Wielki		
1977	Czerwone ciernie	Julia's father	
1977	Sprawa Gorgonowej	Priest	
1977	Tanczacy jastrzab	Wieslawa's Father	
1977	Soldiers of Freedom	Franklin Delano Roosevelt	TV Mini-Series
1980	Zamach stanu	Wojciech Trampczynski	
1980	Głosy	Dean of the Chemistry Department	(final film role)
