= Zofia Mrozowska =

Polish actress (1922–1983)

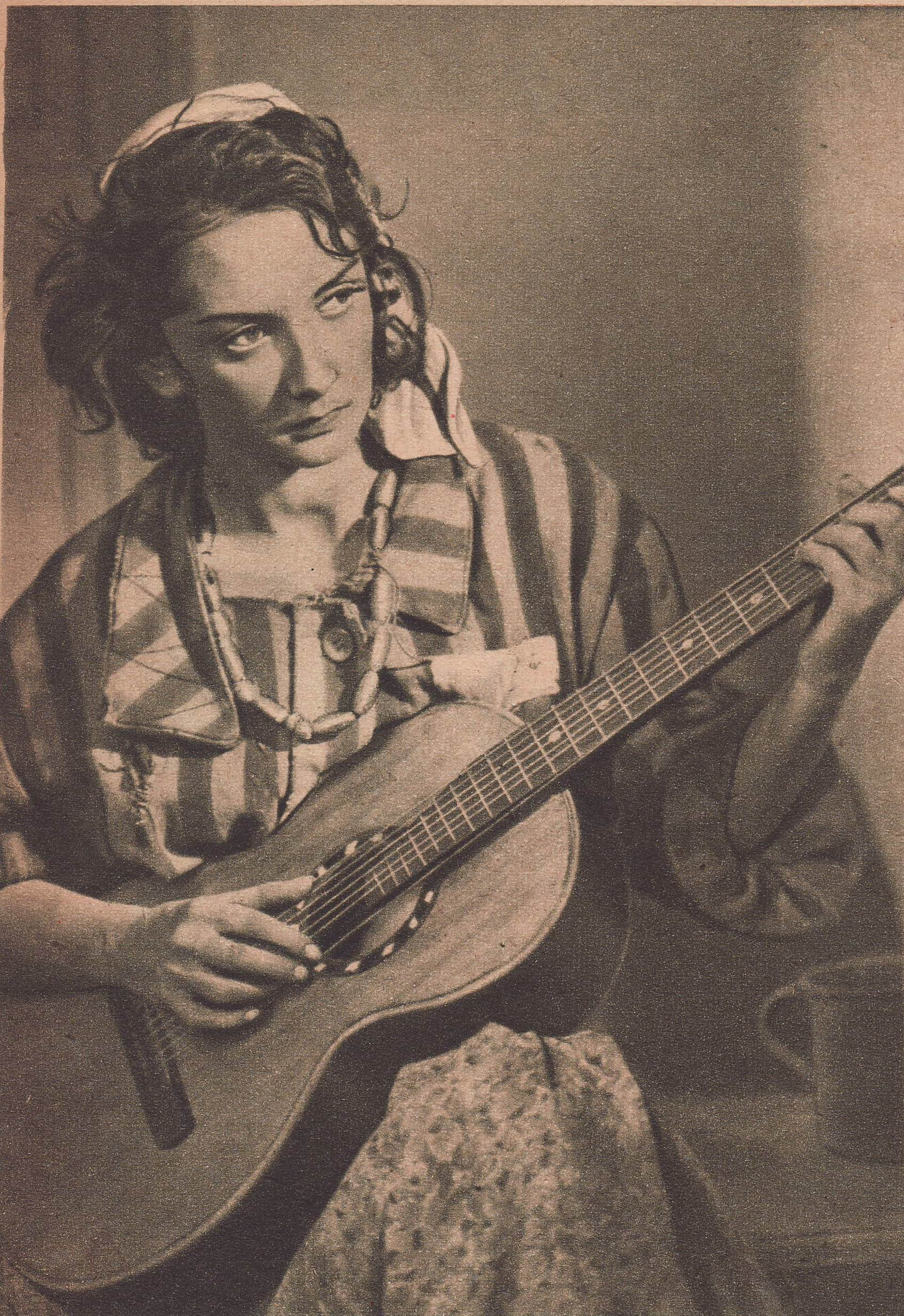
- Born: 24 August 1922; Warsaw, Poland
- Died: 19 August 1983 (aged 60); Warsaw, Poland
- Occupation: Actress
- Years active: 1947–1983

Zofia Mrozowska (24 August 1922 – 19 August 1983) was a Polish film actress. She appeared in 20 films between 1947 and 1983.

== Selected filmography ==
- The Last Stage (1948)
- Unvanquished City (1950)
- A Woman's Decision (1975)
- The Constant Factor (1980)
- Głosy (1980)
