= Anna Jekiełek =

Polish set and costume designer (1937–2021)

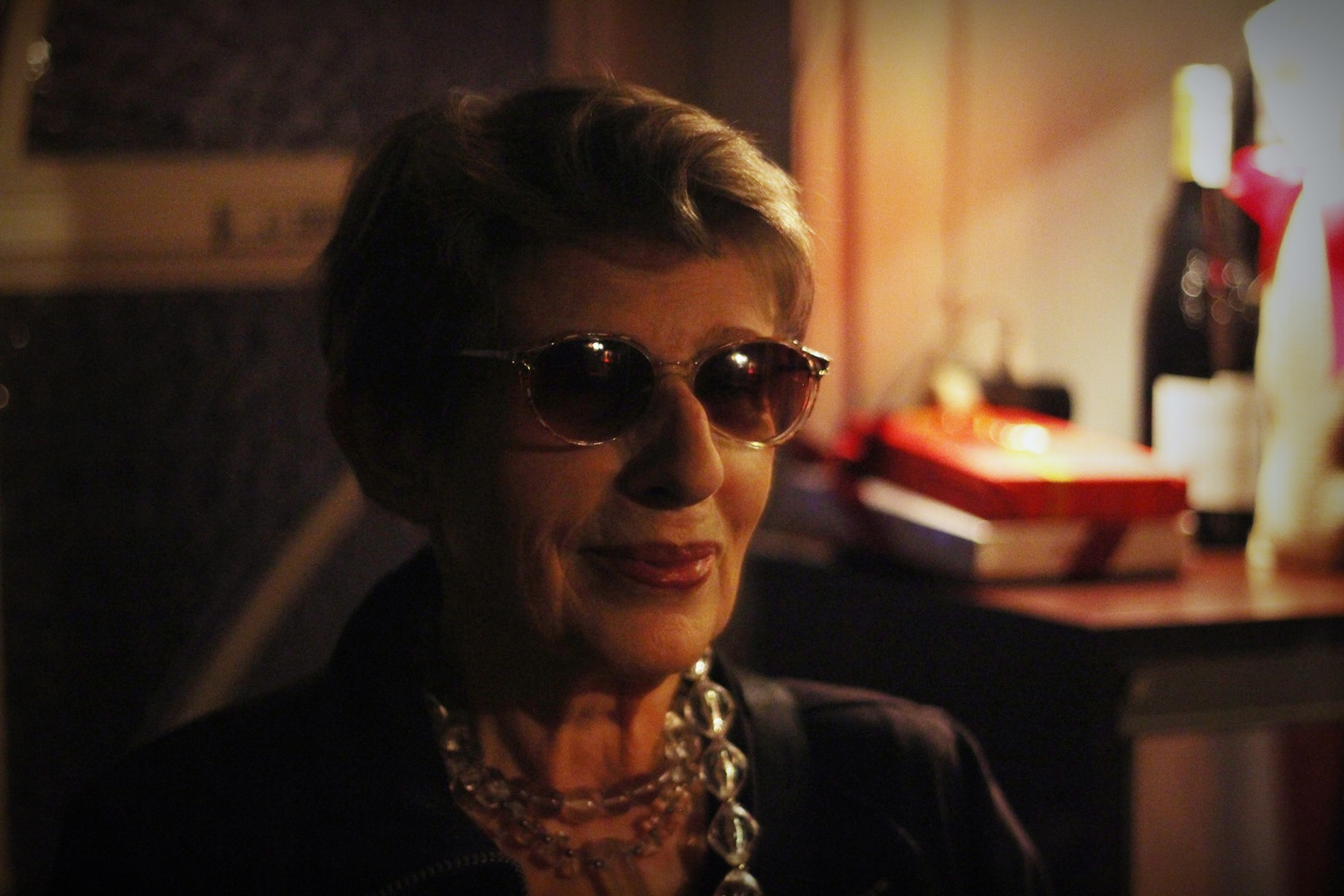
- Anna Jekiełek in 2015
- Born: 29 December 1937; Kraków, Poland
- Died: 25 October 2021 (aged 83)
- Education: Jan Matejko Academy of Fine Arts
- Occupations: set designer, costume designer
- Years active: 1973–2021

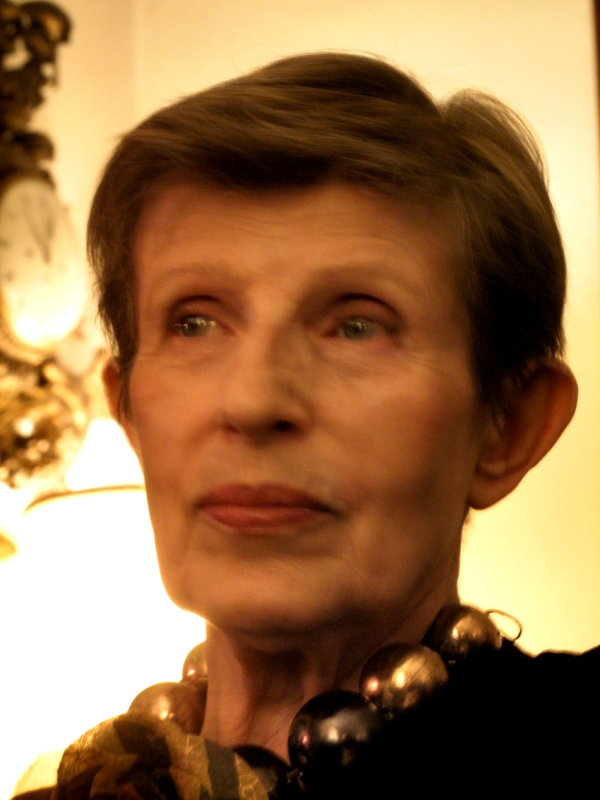
Anna Jekiełek (2013)

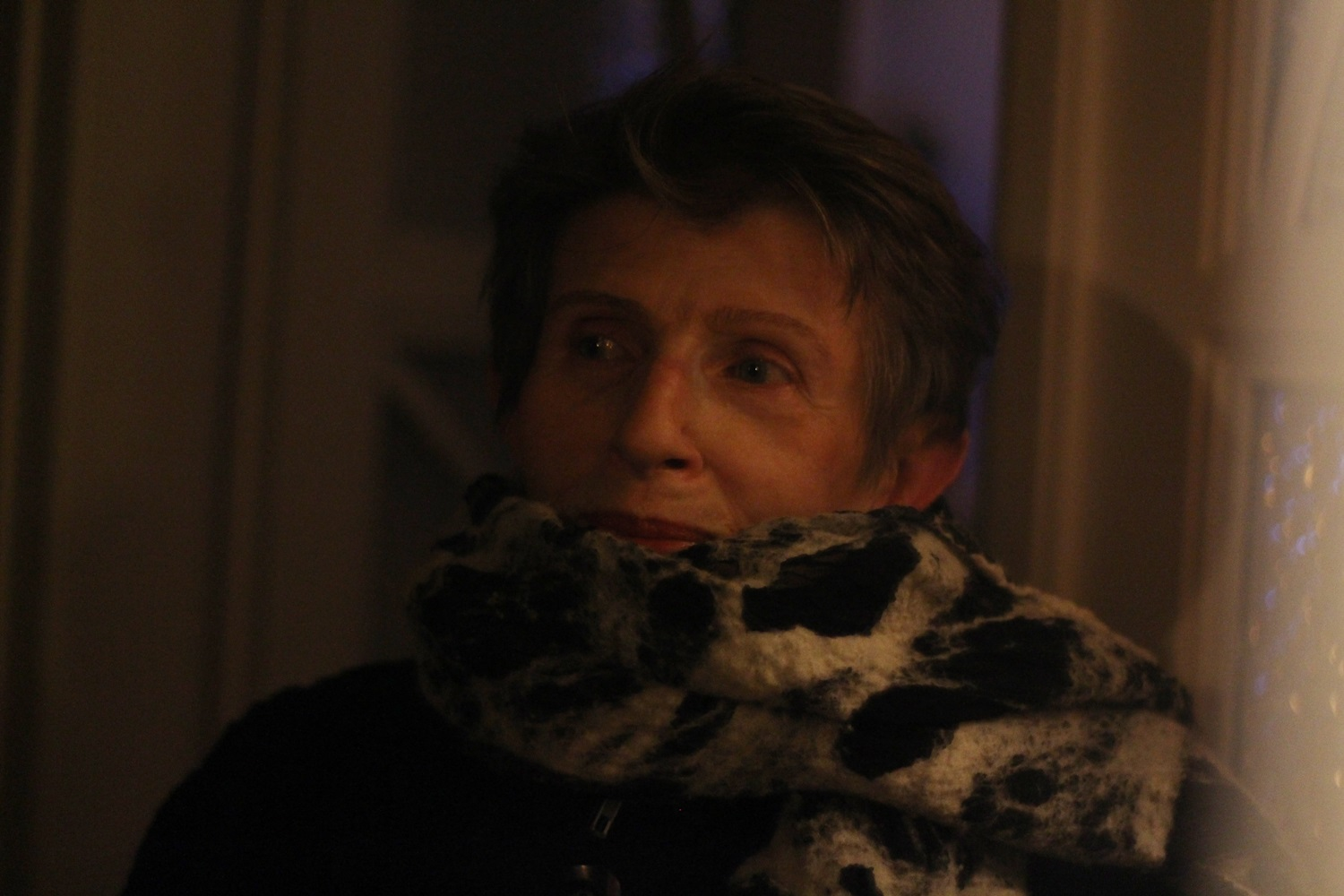
Anna Jekiełek (2015)

Anna Jekiełek-Ciesielska (29 December 1937 – 25 October 2021) was a Polish set and costume designer.

== Biography ==
She began her studies at the Department of Interior Architecture and Industrial Design at the Jan Matejko Academy of Fine Arts, then she moved to the Department of Stage Design. She graduated in 1967. For two years she worked with the TV Center in Cracow. She was also associated with the Teatr Sensacji "Kobra" ("Kobra" Sensation Theater) in Warsaw and the TV Theater in Łódź.

Since 1975 she worked in film groups in Warsaw, mainly in Andrzej Wajda's Zespół Filmowy „X” ("X" Film Group) and in Zespół Filmowy TOR (Tor Film Group), later also in Zespół Filmowy "Oko" ("Oko" Film Group") and "Perspektywa". She was an advisor to the Kraków University of Economics.

Jekiełek made stage sets for the plays in Teatr Nowy in Warsaw, Stefan Jaracz Theatre in Łódź and Teatr Dramatyczny in Legnica.

She was a member of Stowarzyszenie Filmowców Polskich (Polish Filmmakers Association).

== Filmography ==
=== Set design ===
- 1973: Nie ma ptaków połowicznych (TV show)
- 1980: Głosy
- 1981: Wolny strzelec (TV film)
- 1989: Litość Boga (TV show)
- 1989: Odbicia (TV show)

=== Costume design ===
- 1976: Kradzież (TV film)
- 1984: Granica (TV show)
- 2016: Kury (short film)

=== Interior decoration (selection) ===
- 1976–1977: Polskie drogi (TV series; episodes 7–11)
- 1978: Zmory
- 1978: Wśród nocnej ciszy
- 1979: Kung-fu
- 1980: Z biegiem lat, z biegiem dni... (TV series)
- 1980: Nasze podwórko (TV series)
- 1981: Dreszcze
- 1982: Wielki Szu
- 1983: Wir
- 1983: Przeznaczenie
- 1983: Kartka z podróży
- 1985: Sezon na bażanty
- 1989: Marcowe migdały
- 1990: Ucieczka z kina „Wolność”

== Theatre ==
=== Set design ===
- 1981: Ojciec (Teatr Nowy in Warsaw)
- 1982: Lęki poranne (Stefan Jaracz Theatre in Łódź)
- 1982: Ołtarz wzniesiony sobie (Stefan Jaracz Theatre in Łódź)
- 1982: Czerwone pantofelki (Teatr Dramatyczny in Legnica)
