= A Chronicle of Amorous Accidents =

1986 film by Andrzej Wajda

- Directed by: Andrzej Wajda
- Screenplay by: Andrzej Wajda; Tadeusz Konwicki
- Based on: Kronika wypadków miłosnych by Tadeusz Konwicki
- Cinematography: Edward Kłosiński
- Edited by: Halina Prugar-Ketling
- Music by: Wojciech Kilar
- Release date: 24 November 1986
- Running time: 114 minutes
- Country: Poland
- Language: Polish

A Chronicle of Amorous Accidents (Polish: Kronika wypadków miłosnych) is a 1986 Polish drama film directed by Andrzej Wajda, starring Paulina Młynarska and Piotr Wawrzyńczak. It tells the story of two Polish adolescents who fall in love on the eve of World War II. The film is based on the novel of the same title by Tadeusz Konwicki. It premiered in Poland on 24 November 1986.

== Cast ==
- Paulina Młynarska as Alina
- Piotr Wawrzyńczak as Witek
- Magdalena Wójcik as Zuza, Alina's colleague
- Bernadetta Machała as Greta, Engel's sister
- Dariusz Dobkowski as Engel
- Jarosław Gruda as Lowa
- Joanna Szczepkowska as Cecylia
- Gabriela Kownacka as Olimpia
- Krystyna Zachwatowicz as Witek's mother
- Bohdana Majda as Cecylia's and Olimpia's mother
- Adrianna Godlewska as Nałęczowa, Alina's mother

== Production ==
Paulina Młynarska was 14 years old when she played an erotic scene in this film. She said that she was under the influence of sedatives and alcohol administered to her by director Andrzej Wajda. This caused her a strong trauma with which she struggled for many years.
