= Johnny (2022 film) =

2022 Polish film by Daniel Jaroszek

- Polish theatrical release poster
- Directed by: Daniel Jaroszek
- Written by: Maciej Kraszewski
- Produced by: Robert Kijak
- Starring: Dawid Ogrodnik; Piotr Trojan; Beata Zygarlicka; Grażyna Bułka; Maria Pakulnis; Joachim Lamza
- Cinematography: Michał Dąbal
- Edited by: Maciej Kozłowski
- Music by: Michał Kush
- Production company: Next Film
- Distributed by: Next Film; Netflix
- Release date: 12 September 2022 (Gdynia)
- Running time: 119 minutes
- Country: Poland
- Language: Polish

Johnny is a 2022 Polish biographical drama film directed by Daniel Jaroszek and based on the life of Jan Kaczkowski, a Catholic priest who ran a hospice in Puck. It premiered at the Polish Film Festival on 12 September 2022 before receiving a theatrical release in Poland on 23 September 2022.

== Premise ==
Patryk Galewski, an ex-criminal, receives a court order to work at a hospice in Puck. There, meets Fr. Jan Kaczkowski, the compassionate priest who runs the hospice and who himself is dying of cancer.

== Cast ==
- Dawid Ogrodnik as Jan Kaczkowski
- Piotr Trojan as Patryk Galewski
- Beata Zygarlicka as Anna
- Grażyna Bułka as Jadwiga
- Maria Pakulnis as Hanna
- Joachim Lamża as Roman Zalewski
- Marta Stalmierska as Zaneta
- Jakub Nosiadek as "Pablo"
- Anna Dymna as Helena Kaczkowska
- Witold Dębicki as Józef "Ziuk" Kaczkowski
- Magdalena Czerwińska as Magda
- Michał Kaleta as Filip Kaczkowski
- Jerzy Owsiak as himself

== Production ==
Filming took place in Puck, Sopot, Konstancin-Jeziorna, and Żyrardów in 2021.
