= Halina Prugar-Ketling =

Polish film editor (born 1929)

- Born: 26 March 1929 (age 97)
- Citizenship: Polish
- Occupation: Film editor

Halina Prugar-Ketling (born 26 March 1929) is a film editor, member of the Polish Film Academy.

== Filmography ==
- The Eighth Day of the Week (1958)
- Knife in the Water (1962)
- Barrier (1966)
- Hunting Flies (1969)
- Landscape After the Battle (1970)
- The Third Part of the Night (1971)
- The Promised Land (1974)
- Man of Marble (1976)
- Without Anesthesia (1978)
- Znaki zodiaku (1978)
- The Orchestra Conductor (1979)
- The Maids of Wilko (1979)
- Man of Iron (1981)
- Danton (1983)
- A Love in Germany (1983)
- Baryton (1984)
- A Chronicle of Amorous Accidents (1985)
- Jezioro Bodeńskie (1985)
- Maskarada (1986)
- Weryfikacja (1986)
- The Possessed (1988)
- Piłkarski poker (1988)
- Piggate (1990)
- Panny i wdowy (1991)
- Niech żyje miłość (1991)

== Awards ==
- Bronze Medal Gloria Artis Medal for Merit to Culture (2016)
- Platinum Lions (2026)
