= Krzysztof Pieczyński =

Polish actor

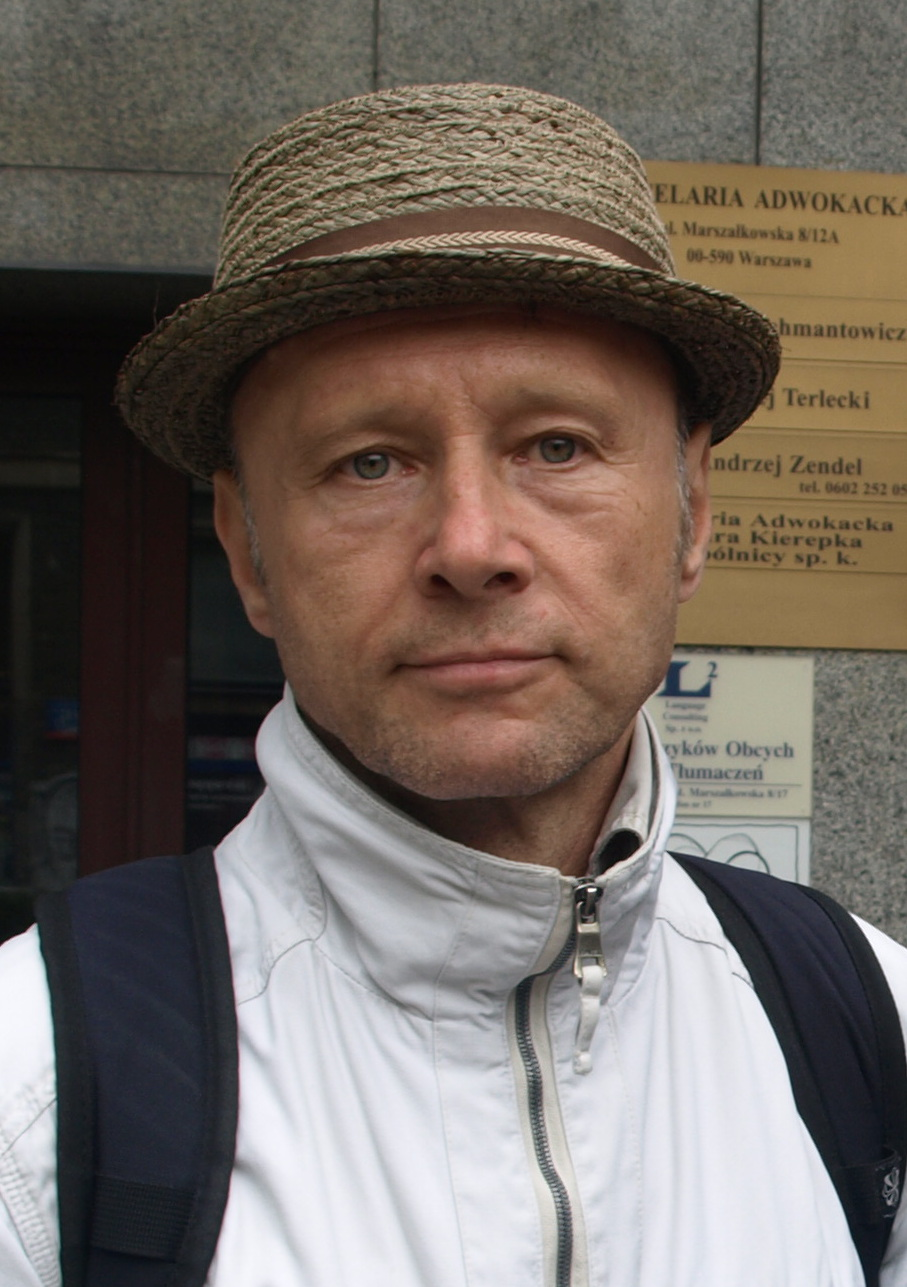
- Born: 27 March 1957 (age 69); Opole, Poland
- Occupation: Actor
- Years active: 1979–present

Krzysztof Pieczyński (born 27 March 1957) is a Polish actor. He has appeared in more than fifty films since 1979.

== Filmography ==
Year	Title	Role	Notes
1983	Krzyk	Marek	
1985	Idol	Tomasz Soltan	
1986	Jezioro Bodeńskie	Protagonist	
1986	Tanie pieniadze	Adam	
1989	Fat Man and Little Boy	Otto Frisch	
1995	Prowokator	Andrzej Woyda	
1995	Grajacy z talerza	Lunda	
1995	Pokuszenie	Security Officer	
1996	Chain Reaction	Lucasz Screbneski	
1999	Fallout	Ivan Nevsky	
1999	Jak narkotyk	Jacek	
2000	Pierwszy milion		
2000	Enduro Bojz	Kuba's Father	
2000	Keep Away from the Window	Jodla	
2001	Reich	Wiesiek	
2001	Jutro bedzie niebo		
2001	Edges of the Lord	German Officer at Trains	
2002	Career of Nikos Dyzma	Kropiel	
2002	The Pianist	Gebczynski	
2004	Out of Reach	Ibo	
2006	Jasminum	Bird Cherry	
2007	Nightwatching	Jacob de Roy	
2009	Generał. Zamach na Gibraltarze	Gen. Wladyslaw Sikorski	
2011	Suicide Room	Andrzej	
2011	Uwiklanie	Igor	
2014	Jack Strong	Brzezinski	
2015	A Grain of Truth	Grzegorz Budnik	
2016	Afterimage	Julian Przyboś	
2018	Sword of God	Willibrord	
2019	Mr Jones	Maxim Litvinov	
