= Henryk Baranowski =

Polish theatre director and actor

- Born: 9 February 1943; Tarnopol, Poland (now Ternopil, Ukraine)
- Died: 27 July 2013 (aged 70)
- Occupations: Theatre director, actor
- Years active: 1969–2012

Henryk Baranowski (9 February 1943 – 27 July 2013) was a Polish theatre, opera and film director, actor, stage designer, playwright, screenwriter and poet. He is best known for his starring role in the film Dekalog: One directed by Krzysztof Kieślowski, and also appeared as Rosa's brother Josef in Rosa Luxemburg directed by Margarethe von Trotta and as Napoleon in Pan Tadeusz directed by Andrzej Wajda. He directed over 60 theater and opera productions in Europe, Russia and the US and was the Artistic Director of the Teatr Śląski (Silesian Theatre) in Katowice in the mid 2000s. He also directed four "television theatre" productions: ...yes I will Yes (1992, adapted from Ulysses by James Joyce), For Phaedra (1998), Saint Witch (2003), and Night is the Mother of Day (2004).

== Early life ==
Baranowski’s father Stanisław Baranowski was a well-known conductor and violinist in the Lviv Philharmonic, and his mother Irena (née Filbert) was the daughter of a Tsarist army officer in Kharkiv. They met during the Second World War after the father had been transferred to the Kharkov opera following the Battle of Lwów in 1939. In 1942, the couple attempted to move away from the war torn region to Kraków, but only got as far as Tarnopol. That fall, the father was killed while searching for food by members of the Banderites. Henryk was born in Tarnopol on 9 February 1943, four months after his father's death.

In 1944, the Baranowski family was deported to Germany to work in a labor camp near Bremen, where they remained for the last year of the war. They stayed in the American Zone of Occupation for three years, then moved first to Kliczków in Lower Silesia then to Bolesławiec.

Baranowski studied mathematics at the University of Wrocław and was a graduate of Philosophy at the University of Warsaw (1968) and the Director's Department at the State Theater School in Warsaw (1973).

== Theatre ==
Baranowski made his directorial debut in 1973 at the Ateneum Theatre in Warsaw with The Maids by Jean Genet, and went on to direct several productions in theatres in Poland, including Man and Wife by Aleksander Fredro at the Teatr im. W. Bogusławski in Kalisz; Four of Them by Gabriela Zapolska at the Baltic Drama Theatre in Koszalin; Ghosts by Henrik Ibsen and Offending the Audience by Peter Handke at Teatr Polski in Bydgoszcz; Hello and Goodbye by Athol Fugard, The Castle by Franz Kafka, Princess Ivona by Witold Gombrowicz and Forefather's Eve by Adam Mickiewicz at the Theatre Jaracza in Olsztyn; School for Wives by Molière at the Teatr Polski in Poznań; and Long Day's Journey into Night by Eugene O’Neill and Totenhorn by Kazimierz Truchanowski at the Teatr Śląski (Silesian Theatre) in Katowice.

On the opening night of Totenhorn, Communist Party officials in attendance walked out, and the government shut down the production the next day. A literary conference was taking place nearby, and the writers organized a petition that reversed the decision. Baranowski staged one final production in Poland – Kafka's The Trial at the Palace of Culture and Science in Warsaw – before leaving the country.

Baranowski emigrated to West Berlin in 1980 and rose to prominence in the city's Freie Theater scene, co-founding the company and theatre school TransformTheater Berlin and the International Directing Seminar at the Künstlerhaus Bethanien with Swiss filmmaker Bettina Wilhelm.

Baranowski's stage adaptations of works by Joyce, Kafka and Dostoyevsky formed the core of TransformTheater Berlin's repertoire. In the early years, he mounted his productions in Berlin, but once the greater openness that followed the founding of Solidarity had been institutionalized, he renewed his work in Poland. Concurrently, he began working in regional theaters in Germany and internationally. His productions were presented at Berlin's Hebbel am Ufer, the Gulbenkian Foundation in Lisbon, the Mittelfest in Italy, the European Theatre Festival in Kraków, and numerous other festivals and venues in Poland, Germany, Russia, Italy, Norway and the USA. In the mid-1990s, he moved to a house in Brwinów, a suburb of Warsaw.

Baranowski made his English language debut with George Tabori's Peepshow in Chicago in 1991, which won a Joseph Jefferson Award for Best Ensemble. He went on to direct a number of other productions in the US in New York, Las Vegas, and Knoxville, Tennessee. In May 2001, he made his UK directing debut with an adaptation of Fyodor Dostoyevsky's The Idiot, produced by The Playground at the Riverside Studios in London.

Baranowski's 2009 production of Loneliness on the Net, adapted from the novel by Janusz Leon Wiśniewski, has remained in the repertoire of the 837-seat Main Stage of the Baltic House in Saint Petersburg, Russia through the 2017/18 season, almost a decade after its premiere.

== Opera ==
Later in his career, Baranowski’s attention turned increasing to opera. His production of Philip Glass’ Akhnaten for the Teatr Wielki in Łodzi won a Silver Boat for Best Production and a Golden Mask for Best Director. His staging of Alfred Schnittke's Life with an Idiot in a co-production by the Novosibirsk State Academic Opera and Ballet Theatre and Hahn Produktion in Berlin won three Russian Golden Mask Awards, including Best Production.

== Theatre productions (director) ==
Theatre productions:

- 1971 – The Maids Teatr Ateneum im. S. Jaracza, Warsaw
- 1971 – School of Wives Teatr Polski, Poznań
- 1971 – The Other Room Teatr w Opolu
- 1972 – Poison, Love, Singing (after Carlo Goldoni's The Two Venetian Twins) Teatr im. W. Bogusławskiego, Kalisz (also libretto)
- 1973 – Ghosts Teatr Polski, Bydgoszcz and Teatr im. Wojciecha Bogusławskiego, Kalisz (also adaptation)
- 1974 – La Dame aux Camélias Bałtycki Teatr Dramatyczny im. Juliusza Słowackiego, Koszalin-Słupsk (also stage adaptation)
- 1974 – Twins Today(after Carlo Goldoni's The Two Venetian Twins) Bałtycki Teatr Dramatyczny im. Juliusza Słowackiego w Koszalinie
- 1975 – Four of Them Bałtycki Teatr Dramatyczny im. Juliusza Słowackiego w Koszalin-Słupsk
- 1975 – The Maids Teatr Polski, Bydgoszcz
- 1975 – Offending the Audience Teatr Polski, Bydgoszcz
- 1975 – Life Lines stage adaptation of African poetry Estrada, Szczecin
- 1975 – The Castle Teatr im. S. Jaracza, Olsztyn-Elbląg
- 1976 – Hello and Goodbye Teatr im. Stefana Jaracza, Olsztyn-Elbląg
- 1976 – Princess Ivona Teatr im. Stefana Jaracza, Olsztyn-Elbląg
- 1977 – Forefather's Eve Teatr im. Stefana Jaracza, Olsztyn-Elbląg (also stage adaptation)
- 1978 – Long Day's Journey into Night Silesian Theatre, Katowice (also design)
- 1978 – Totenhorn Silesian Theatre, Katowice (also stage adaptation)
- 1979 – The Source Teatr Polski, Szczecin
- 1979 – The Trial Teatr Studio at the Palace of Culture and Science, Warsaw
- 1981 – The Maids TransformTheater Berlin
- 1983 – Termitière Suprème-Anthropomorphosen (site-specific performance in urban plaza, texts by James Joyce) TransformTheater Berlin
- 1985 – He Who Gets Slapped TransformTheater Berlin at the Renaissance Theater, Berlin
- 1985 – Japanese Games TransformTheater Berlin at Künstlerhaus Hanover, tour to Oslo, Bergen and Aarhus
- 1985 – Despoiled Shore. Medeamaterial. Landscape with Argonauts Teatr Studio at the Palace of Culture and Science, Warsaw and Theatermanufaktur Berlin
- 1986 – King David TransformTheater Berlin at za Granicą
- 1987 – Operetta TransformTheater Berlin at Hebbel am Ufer
- 1988 – Explosion of a Memory TransformTheater Berlin at Teatr Studio at the Palace of Culture and Science, Warsaw and Berlin
- 1989 – The Trial Freie Volksbuehne, Berlin, tour to za Granicą Festival and the Rassegna Internationale Teatri Stabili, Florence
- 1989 – Ghost Sonata TransformTheater Berlin at the Oslo International Theater Festival and Bergen International Theater
- 1990 – Suppressed and Offended Omsk Drama Theatre, Siberia and Theater Der Welt at the Grillo-Theater, Essen
- 1990 – The Old Woman Broods TransformTheater Berlin (also adaptation and design)
- 1991 – ...yes I will Yes stage adaptation of Joyce's Ulysses Teatr Szwedzka 2/4, Warsaw (also adaptation and design)
- 1991 – Peepshow TransformTheater Berlin/Facets Performance Studio at Chopin Theatre, Chicago (also design)
- 1992 – ...a way alone a last a loved a long the riverrun aka Water Dreams of a Shy Monster: a sensuation on James Joyce aka Bieg rzeki stage adaptation of sections of Ulysses, Exiles, Finnegans Wake and Nora: The Real Life of Molly Bloom by Brenda Maddox TransformTheater Berlin at Calouste Gulbenkian Foundation, Lisbon; Polish Cultural Center at Alexanderplatz, Berlin; Sala Sołota / European Theater Festival, Kraków; 'Kontakt' International Theater Festival, Torun; Adam Mickiewicz Theatre, Cieszyn; Theaterhaus Stuttgart; Moscow (also adaptation)
- 1992 – The Castle Teatr Szwedzka 2/4, Warsaw and Cividale Mittelfest (also stage adaptation, stage design and lighting design)
- 1992 – The Balcony Omsk Drama Theatre
- 1993 – Ghosts Instytut Teatru Narodowego, Warsaw (also design)
- 1993 – Pentesilea Kraków (also design)
- 1994 – Ghetto Staatstheater Cottbus
- 1995 – Peepshow Teatr Rozmaitości, Warsaw (also design)
- 1996 – Black Comedy Teatr Bagatela Kraków (also design)
- 1996 – The Trial Teatr Rozmaitości, Warsaw (also design)
- 1997 – Macbeth Theater 2000, Zagreb at Pula Castle
- 1997 – My Mother/When We Dead Awaken Artaud/Bataille/Ibsen Artaud Festival, Bergen
- 1998 – White Marriage Playwrights Horizons/New York University
- 1998 – Mein Kampf Clarence Brown Theatre, Knoxville
- 1998 – Hess Deutsche Nationaltheater, Weimar
- 1999 – Ghosts Clarence Brown Theatre
- 1999 – Captain Ulysses Heidelberg Festival
- 2000 – The Oresteia Clarence Brown Theatre, Knoxville and Bratislava
- 2001 – The Balcony UNLV University Theatre at the Judy Bayley Theatre
- 2001 – The Idiot The Playground at Riverside Studios, London UK
- 2002 – The Flies Istrapolitana Festival, Bratislava (also adaptation and design)
- 2004 – Mein Kampf Silesian Theatre, Katowice (also design)
- 2004 – Division By Zero Silesian Theatre, Katowice
- 2006 – Macbeth. Work in Progress. Silesian Theatre, Katowice
- 2006 – The Old Woman Broods Teatr Ludowy, Kraków
- 2009 – Loneliness on the Net Baltic House, St. Petersburg, Russia
- 2012 – The Tempest Volkov Theatre, Yaroslavl

== Opera productions ==
Opera productions:

- 1993 – Die Fledermaus Teatr Wielki im. Stanisława Moniuszki, Poznań (also adaptation and lighting design) tour of the Netherlands
- 2000 – Akhnaten Teatr Wielki, Łódź (also design)
- 2001 – Porgy and Bess Teatr Wielki, Łódź
- 2003 – Life With an Idiot Novosibirsk State Academic Opera and Ballet Theatre and Hahn Produktion Toured to Moscow and Rome and to Munich, Magdeburg, and the Deutsche Oper in Berlin as part of the Russian Culture Days in Germany 2003/4
- 2004 – Rigoletto Opera Krakowska
- 2006 – Lady Macbeth of Mtsensk Novosibirsk State Academic Opera and Ballet Theatre
- 2007 – The Barber of Seville Teatr Wielki, Łódź (also adaptation, design)
- 2012 – The Elixir of Love Opera Krakowska (also design)

== Television productions ==
Television productions:

- 1992 – ...yes I will Yes (also wrote screenplay)
- 1998 – For Phaedra
- 2003 – Saint Witch
- 2004 – Night is the Mother of Day

== Selected filmography ==
Films:

- Wszystko (1972, dir. Piotr Szulkin)
- Rosa Luxemburg Josef, Rosa's brother (1986, dir. Margarethe von Trotta)
- Dekalog Krzysztof (1988, dir. Krzysztof Kieslowski)
  - Dekalog: One
  - Dekalog: Three
- Pan Tadeusz Napoleon Bonaparte (1999, dir. Andrzej Wajda)

== Radio productions ==
Radio productions for Teatr Polskiego Radia:

- 2011 – Dziewanna by Jacek Dobrowolski
- 2012 – A Dream About King David by Helmut Kajzar
- 2012 – Tułacze (after Exiles by James Joyce)
- 2012 – When We Dead Awaken by Henrik Ibsen

== Awards ==
- 1976 – First prize for Hello and Goodbye at the Festival of Small-Theatre-Forms "KONTRAPUNKT" in Szczecin
- 1976 – First prize for adaptation and direction for The Castle at the XVIII Festival of North Polish Theatres in Toruń
- 1991 – ITI Award for Promotion of Polish Theatre Culture Abroad
- 1992 – Award from the Minister of Foreign Affairs for Outstanding Merit in the Promotion of Polish Culture and Art Abroad
- 1992 – Joseph Jefferson Award for Best Ensemble for Peepshow, TransformTheater Berlin/Facets Performance Studio
- 2000 – Golden Mask for Best Director and Silver Boat for best production for Akhnaten, Teatr Wielki, Łódź
- 2004 – Golden Mask for Best Opera Production for Life with An Idiot, Novosibirsk Opera and Ballet Theatre
