= Julia Kijowska =

Polish actress (born 1981)

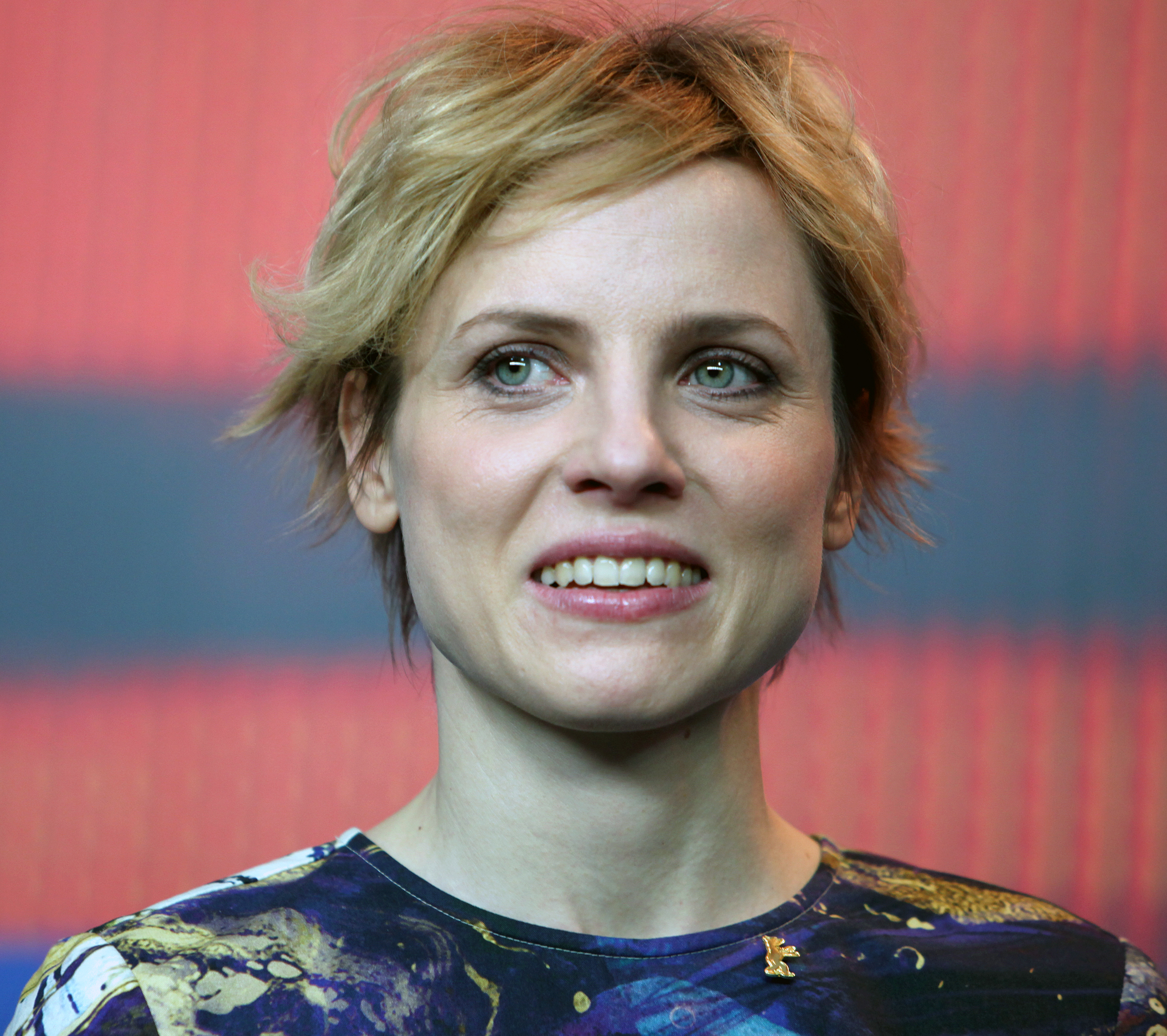
- Kijowska at the 2016 Berlin International Film Festival
- Born: 16 March 1981 (age 44); Warsaw, Poland
- Education: Aleksander Zelwerowicz National Academy of Dramatic Art
- Occupation: Actress
- Father: Janusz Kijowski

Julia Kijowska (born 16 March 1981) is a Polish actress. Her notable films include In Darkness (2011), The Mighty Angel (2014), and United States of Love (2016). The daughter of the director Janusz Kijowski, she studied acting at the Aleksander Zelwerowicz National Academy of Dramatic Art in Warsaw and began her career in theatre productions.

== Life and career ==
Julia Kijowska was born in March 1981 in Warsaw. A daughter of the Polish director Janusz Kijowski, she completed her training as an actress in 2005 at the Aleksander Zelwerowicz National Academy of Dramatic Art and began acting in theatre productions. From 2006 to 2012 she was affiliated with the Dramatic Theatre in Warsaw and from 2013 with Teatr Ateneum. Beginning in 2008, she appeared in Polish film productions, making her debut in a feature film with roles in 0_1_0 and Boisko bezdomnych. Her notable films include In Darkness (2011), The Mighty Angel (2014), and United States of Love (2016).

== Awards ==
In 2007, Julia Kijowska received the award "Feliks Warszawski" in the category: best leading female role for the role of Una in the play "Blackbird". Kijowska's work has been recognised with several awards, including the Best Actor award at the 2012 Thessaloniki International Film Festival for her role in Miłość and the 2014 Special Awards of the Polish Ministry of Culture and National Heritage. In 2018, she was given a special recognition by the jury of the Zbigniew Cybulski Award.

== Filmography ==
Film performances
Year	Title	Role	Notes
2008	0_1_0	Julia	
2008	Boisko Bezdomnych	Kaska	
2010	Wenecja	Klaudyna	
2010	Lincz	Investigator	
2008	Jutro mnie tu nie będzie	Marta Sobzcak	
2011	In Darkness	Chaja	Polish title: W ciemności
2012	Miłość	Maria Niedzielska	
2013	Gry	Ewa	
2013	Rogówka	Maria Madecka	
2014	Serce Serduszko	Kordula	
2014	The Mighty Angel	Ona	Polish title: Pod Mocnym Aniołem
2014	Matka	Anna	
2015	The Red Spider	Danka	Polish title: Czerwony pająk
2016	United States of Love	Agata	Polish title: Zjednoczone Stany Miłości
2016	Sługi boże	Ana Wittesch	
2016	Jordgubbslandet	Agnieszka	
2016	Via Carpatia	Julia	Acted as co-producer
2018	Nina	Nina	
2019	Żelazny Most	Magda	
2020	Fisheye	Anna Waterman	
