= Jan Kaczkowski =

Polish Catholic priest (1977–2016)

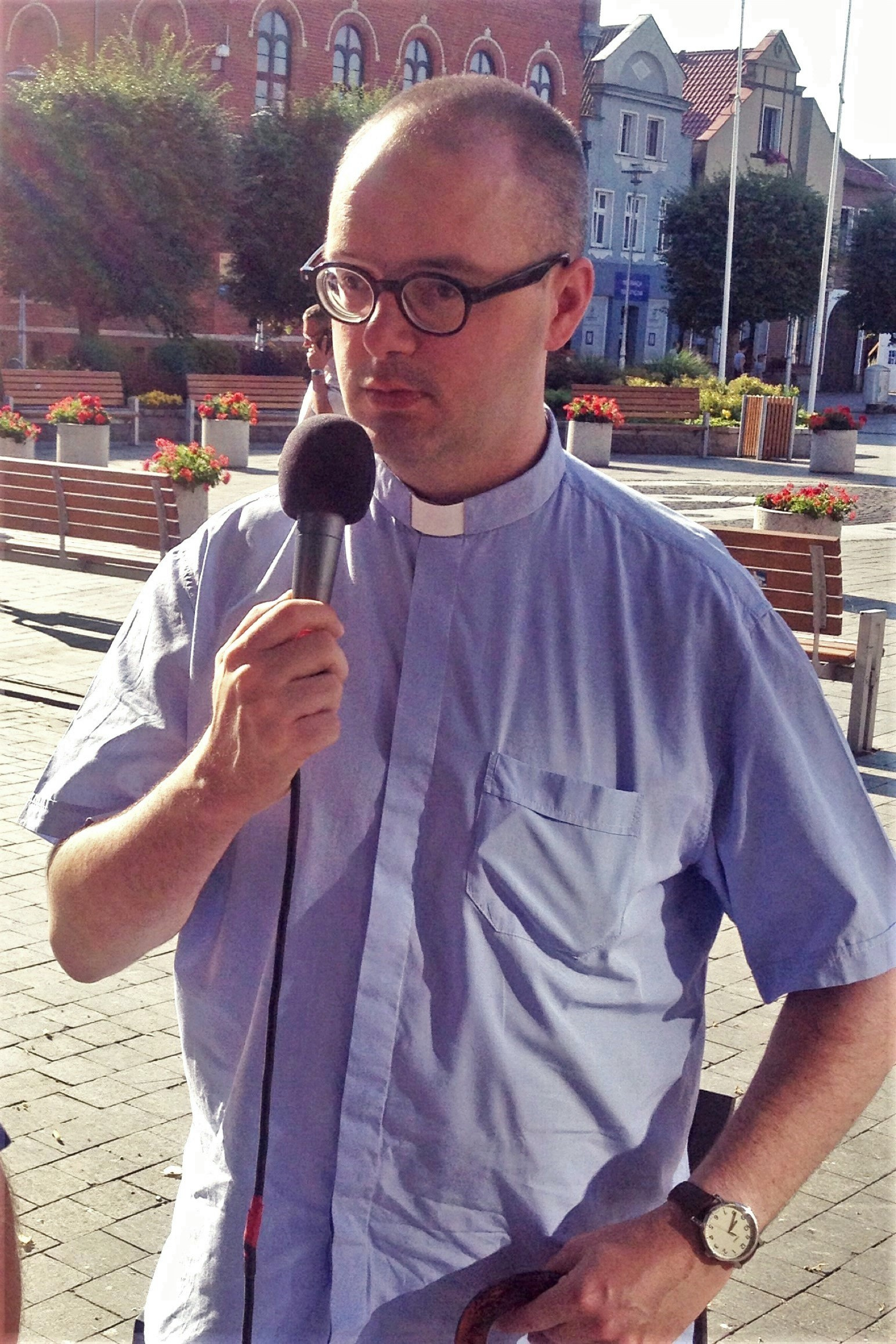
- Archdiocese: Archdiocese of Gdańsk

Orders
- Ordination: 15 June 2002

Personal details
- Born: 19 July 1977 Gdynia, Poland
- Died: 28 March 2016 (aged 38) Sopot, Poland
- Denomination: Roman Catholicism
- Education: Gdańsk Theological Seminary
- Alma mater: Cardinal Stefan Wyszyński University; Pontifical University of John Paul II

Jan Adam Kaczkowski (July 19, 1977 – March 28, 2016) was a Polish Roman Catholic priest, doctor of theological sciences, bioethicist, vlogger, and director of the Puck Hospice.

== Life ==
Jan Kaczkowski was born on July 19, 1977, in Gdynia, Poland. After graduating from high school, Kaczkowski was admitted to the Gdańsk Theological Seminary, where in 2002 he defended his master's thesis in theology. The same year he was ordained a priest. Kaczkowski continued his studies, and in 2007 obtained a doctorate in theology at the Cardinal Stefan Wyszyński University in Warsaw, and a year later he completed postgraduate studies in bioethics at the Pontifical University of John Paul II in Kraków.

From 2004, he engaged himself in the creation of a hospice in Puck. He coordinated the construction of the hospice from 2007 to 2009. He remained the director of the institution until his death. In addition to working at the hospice, he worked as a catechist at a high school from 2004 to 2011, as well as serving as a vicar.

Kaczkowski suffered from health problems from birth, having a severe eyesight deficit and left-sided paresis. In 2012, he was further diagnosed with glioblastoma, and he died from the condition on March 28, 2016.

== Awards and legacy ==
- On April 11, 2012, he was awarded the Order of Polonia Restituta by Polish president Bronisław Komorowski.
- He was awarded the title of honorary citizen of Puck.
- In 2022, a biographical film Johnny was released about his life. The movie had the second best Polish film result in the domestic box office in 2022.
