= Głosy =

1981 film written and directed by Janusz Kijowski

- Directed by: Janusz Kijowski
- Written by: Janusz Kijowski
- Starring: Ewa Dałkowska; Krzysztof Zaleski
- Cinematography: Krzysztof Wyszyński
- Edited by: Irena Choryńska
- Music by: Jerzy Matula
- Production company: Zespól Filmowy "X"
- Release dates: September 1981 (Gdańsk); 26 July 1982 (Poland)
- Running time: 98 minutes
- Country: Poland
- Language: Polish

Głosy is a 1981 Polish psychological film written and directed by Janusz Kijowski and released in 1982. The film was awarded for best sound and best leading actor (Krzysztof Zaleski) at the Polish Film Festival in Gdańsk in 1981.

== Cast ==
- Ewa Dałkowska as Ewa Domańska
- Krzysztof Zaleski as Marek Ruda
- Edmund Fetting as doctor Meller, psychiatrist
- Piotr Fronczewski as psychiatrist Andrzej Domański, former husband of Ewa
- Ewa Wiśniewska as dentist Zofia Werte, a friend of Ewa
- Teresa Sawicka as Iwona Ruda, Marek's wife
- Wiesław Michnikowski as priest Żółkiewski
- Stanisław Jaśkiewicz as dean of the chemistry faculty
- Zofia Mrozowska as Marek's mother-in-law
- Janusz Zakrzeński as Józef Bartkowski, Marek's boss
- Tomasz Lulek as Krzysiek, Marek's student
- Cezary Morawski as Misza
- Jerzy Matula as a patient of a psychiatric facility
- Olgierd Łukaszewicz as Broniarek

== Crew ==
- Directed by: Janusz Kijowski
- Written by: Janusz Kijowski
- Music by: Jerzy Matula
- Cinematography by: Krzysztof Wyszyński
- Edited by: Irena Choryńska
- Stage design by: Anna Jekiełek, Adam Kopczyński
- Sound: Norbert Zbigniew Mędlewski
