= Joanna Szczepkowska =

Polish actress and writer

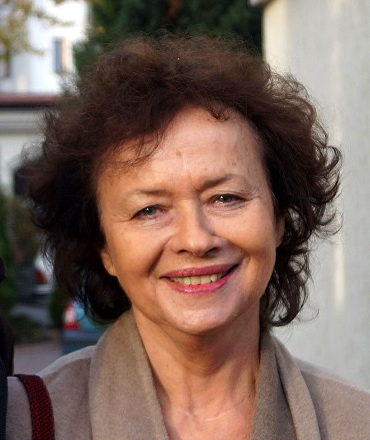
- Joanna Szczepkowska, 2018
- Born: 1 May 1953 (age 73); Warsaw, Poland
- Education: National Academy of Dramatic Art in Warsaw
- Occupations: Actress, writer
- Years active: 1975-present
- Awards: Knight's Cross of the Order of Polonia Restituta (2007)

Joanna Szczepkowska (Polish pronunciation: [jɔˈanna ʂt͡ʂɛpˈkɔfska]; born 1 May 1953) is a Polish film and theatre actress and writer. She has appeared in more than thirty films since 1975.

== Life and career ==
She made her debut on television in 1975 by appearing in episode 1 of the cult 1970s TV series Czterdziestolatek (The Forty-Year-Old). The same year, she graduated from the National Academy of Dramatic Art in Warsaw. She worked as a theatre actress for such institutions as Teatr Współczesny in Warsaw (1975–1981), the Polish Theatre (1981–1988), Teatr Powszechny (1988–1992, 2000–2004) and Teatr Dramatyczny (2006–2010).

Throughout her career she appeared in numerous films including Jan Batory's 1975 film Con amore, Janusz Zaorski's 1982 film The Mother of Kings, Andrzej Wajda's 1986 film A Chronicle of Amorous Accidents, Krzysztof Kieślowski's 1988 Dekalog: Three, Izabella Cywińska's TV film series Boża podszewka, Paweł Komorowski's 1998 film Syzyfowe prace, Rafał Wieczyński's 2009 biopic Popiełuszko. Wolność jest w nas and Juliusz Machulski's 2017 film Volta.

In 1997, she published a collection of poetry titled Miasta do wynajęcia.

In 2007, she was awarded the Knight's Cross of the Order of Polonia Restituta.

In 2010, she was elected President of the Union of Polish Stage Actors (ZASP), the first woman to hold this post.

She runs her own theatre named Teatr Na dole.

== 1989 interview ==
On 28 October 1989, during a live interview on the main state-run evening news programme Dziennik Telewizyjny (Television Journal), she made a historic statement in which she publicly announced the end of communism in Poland:

Proszę Państwa, 4 czerwca 1989 roku skończył się w Polsce komunizm. (Ladies and gentlemen, on the 4th of June, communism ended in Poland.)

This statement went down in history as a symbol of the political changes which took place in the country after the 1989 Polish legislative election, the first partially free elections in Poland after the World War II.

== Personal life ==
She is the daughter of actor Andrzej Szczepkowski, and Roma née Parandowska, and the granddaughter of Jan Parandowski.

== Selected filmography ==
Film
| Year | Title | Role | Notes |
|---|---|---|---|
| 1987 | The Mother of Kings | Marta Król | |
| 1986 | A Chronicle of Amorous Accidents | Cecylia | |
| 1998 | Syzyfowe prace | Borowicz's mother | |

TV
| Year | Title | Role | Notes |
|---|---|---|---|
| 1988 | Decalogue III | Janusz's wife | |

== See also ==
- Cinema of Poland
- List of Polish actors
