= Maria Pakulnis =

Polish actress (born 1956)

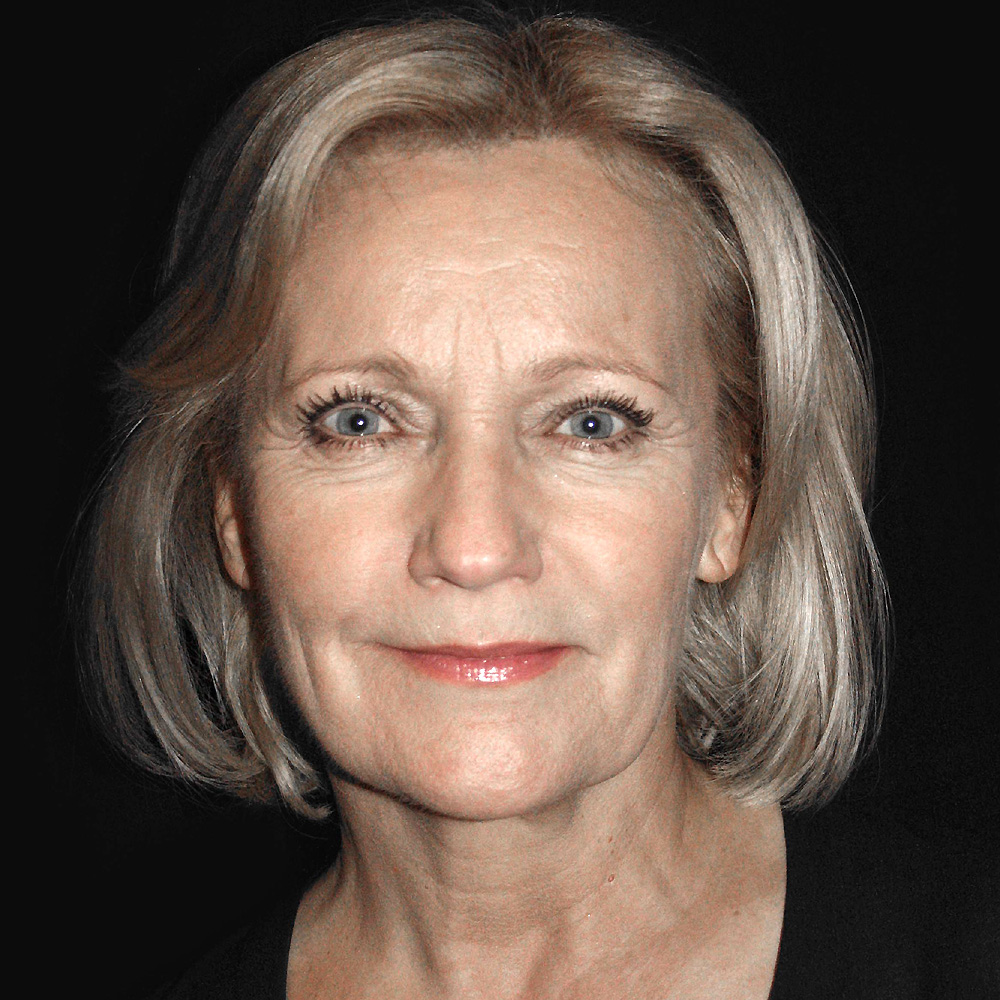
- Pakulnis in 2020
- Born: 2 July 1956 (age 70); Giżycko, Poland
- Occupation: Actress
- Years active: 1978–present
- Spouse: Krzysztof Zaleski (m. 1984)

Maria Pakulnis (born July 2, 1956) is a Polish actress. She received Polish Academy Award for Best Supporting Actress for her performance in the 2022 drama film Johnny.

== Life and career ==
Pakulnis was born in Giżycko, Poland to polish immigrants from Lithuania. In 1976 she graduated from medical college and in 1980 from the Aleksander Zelwerowicz National Academy of Dramatic Art in Warsaw. In 1984 she married director Krzysztof Zaleski, whey have son born in 1990.

Pakulnis performed on both stage and screen. She was regular performer on Warsaw stage productions since 1982 and the same year starred in the drama film The Issa Valley directed by Tadeusz Konwicki. In 1986 she received Best Supporting Actress Award at the Polish Film Festival for her roles in films Jezioro Bodeńskie and Weryfikacja. Her other notable film credits include No End (1985), Dekalog: Three (1989) and Farewell to Autumn (1990). In 2022 she received Polish Academy Award for Best Supporting Actress for her performance in the 2022 drama film Johnny.

On television, Pakulnis appeared in more than 50 made-for-television movies, miniseries and series, such as regular roles in First Love (2004–2007, 2009–2021), Tylko miłość (2007–2009), Sisters (2009–2010), Leśniczówka (2018–2023), The Elements of Sasza – Fire (2020), Osiecka (2020–2021), Rysa (2021), The Mother (2022) and Dewajtis (2023). She also made appearances on Na dobre i na złe, Niania, True Law and Father Matthew.

== Filmography ==
- Biały mazur (1979)
- The Issa Valley (1982)
- No End (1985)
- Jezioro Bodeńskie (1986)
- Zygfryd (1986)
- Weryfikacja (1986)
- Zabij mnie glino (1988)
- Schodami w górę, schodami w dół (1988)
- Obywatel Piszczyk (1988)
- On the Silver Globe (1988)
- Oszołomienie (1989)
- Dekalog: Three (1989)
- Konsul (1989)
- Farewell to Autumn (1990)
- Neha (1991)
- Pajęczarki (1993)
- Deborah (1995)
- The Last Mission (2000)
- Ubu Król (2003)
- Rozdroże Cafe (2005)
- Lekarz drzew (2005)
- Dublerzy (2006)
- Bezmiar sprawiedliwosci (2006)
- Spring 1941 (2008)
- Zloty srodek (2009)
- Porady na zdrady (2017)
- Planet Single 3 (2019)
- Adwokat (2019)
- Jak zostać gwiazdą (2020)
- Szczescia chodza parami (2022)
- Johnny (2022)
- Na twoim miejscu (2023)
- The Breach (2023)
- Skolowani (2023)
