= The Mother of Kings =

1987 Polish film

- Directed by: Janusz Zaorski
- Written by: Kazimierz Brandys; Janusz Zaorski
- Starring: Magda Teresa Wójcik
- Cinematography: Edward Klosinski
- Edited by: Józef Bartczak
- Release date: March 1987
- Running time: 127 minutes
- Country: Poland
- Language: Polish

The Mother of Kings (Polish: Matka Królów) is a 1982 Polish drama film, directed by Janusz Zaorski. It was immediately banned by the Polish Communist regime - having depicted that regime as baselessly hounding and persecuting a loyal and devoted party member. The film only received a proper release in 1987. It was entered into the 38th Berlin International Film Festival, where it won the Silver Bear for an outstanding single achievement.

== Plot ==
The early part of the film takes place in 1930's Poland. Lucja Krol, a working-class woman, loses her husband who was run over by a tram. Soon afterwards she gives birth to her fourth son, alone on the floor in her apartment. Lucja's neighbor Wiktor who is a Communist intellectual, tries to help the poverty-stricken Lucja and her children, but is arrested and imprisoned by Poland's pre-war right-wing regime. Then come the dark years of the German occupation. At the black market, Lucja narrowly avoids a Nazi roundup. Lucja sons turn to Communism and hold ardent meetings in their apartment, with their mother's blessing. Lucja goes on working hard, and without complaining. After the war, the Communists take power in Poland - but rather than being rewarded for his loyal service, the son Klemens is inexplicably arrested, and without any foundation the new regime accuses him of having been a collaborator. His brother Wiktor, who now holds a senior position in the Communist Party, tries to defend him - but then himself falls into disgrace. Klemens undergoes torture in order to extract a false "confession" but dies in prison, a Communist to the end. His mother Lucja is never told about what happened to him.

== Cast ==
- Magda Teresa Wójcik as Lucja Król
- Zbigniew Zapasiewicz as Wiktor Lewen
- Franciszek Pieczka as Cyga
- Bogusław Linda as Klemens Król
- Adam Ferency as Zenon Król
- Michal Juszczakiewicz as Stas Król
- Krzysztof Zaleski as Roman Król
- Joanna Szczepkowska as Marta Stecka / Stecka-Król
- Henryk Bista as Grzegorz Wiechra
- Zbigniew Bielski as Kogut
- Tadeusz Huk as Renard
- Jerzy Trela as Hiszpan
- Stanislaw Kwaskowski as Dentysta
