= Sword of God (film) =

2018 Polish film

Sword of God (also called The Mute) is a 2018 Polish film directed by Bartosz Konopka. Cinematography was done by Jacek Podgorski.

The movie tells the story of a bishop named Willibrord (Krzysztof Pieczyński) who is the only survivor of a party that evidently came to Christianize a population. He arrives by boat on an unnamed island where he is found, and nursed back to health, by another survivor of an earlier group, played by Karol Bernacki. They encounter a tribal society belonging to a different religion; Willibrord challenges their shaman to a "trial by fire" (walking across a bed of coals), which Willibrord survives, but the local priest does not. Willibrord is given permission by the chief to build a church, but may not enter the village. His partner, who doubts his intentions, sews his own mouth shut; some in the village see a prophet in him.

== Production ==
Bartosz Konopka wrote the screenplay with Przemysław Nowakowski and Anna Wydra. The latter, through Otter Films, is also the film's producer. The film is co-produced by Odra Film from Poland Earlybirds Films from Belgium.
