= Janusz Zaorski =

Polish film director (born 1947)

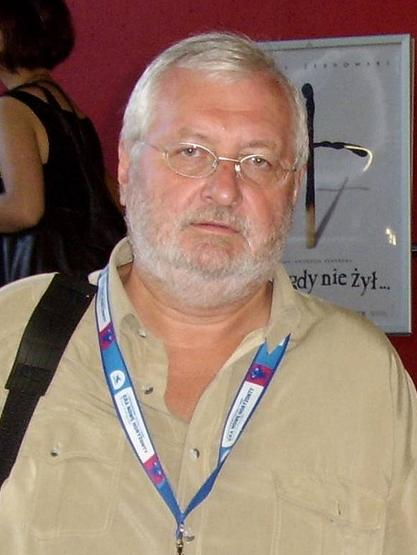
- Janusz Zaorski, 2007
- Born: 19 September 1947 (age 78); Warsaw, Poland
- Occupations: Film director, scenarist, actor
- Years active: 1967–present
- Parent: Tadeusz Zaorski

Janusz Zaorski (born 19 September 1947) is a Polish film director, scenarist and actor, representative of the cinema of moral anxiety (Polish: kino moralnego niepokoju), trend in Polish cinema. Zaorski has directed mainly psychological dramas, comedies and TV series.

Zaorski graduated National Film School in Łódź in 1969. He made his own individual film director debut in 1970. In 1987 Zaorski was selected as a chairman of the Polish Federation of Film Societies (Polska Federacja Dyskusyjnych Klubów Filmowych). He was also an art director of the Film Group "Dom" (since 1988), member of the Cinematography Committee (1987–1989), president of the Radio & Television Committee (1991–1992), president of The National Council of Radio Broadcasting and Television (Krajowa Rada Radiofonii i Telewizji; 1994–1995), member of the European Film Academy.

== Selected filmography ==
=== Director ===
- Maestro (1967)
- Spowiedź (1968)
- Na dobranoc (1970)
- Uciec jak najbliżej (1971)
- Awans (1974)
- Zezem (1976) – TV series
- Zdjęcia próbne (1976)
- Pokój z widokiem na morze (1977)
- Dziecinne pytania (1981)
- Matka Królów (1982)
- Baryton (1984)
- Jezioro Bodeńskie (1985)
- Zabawa w chowanego (1985)
- Piłkarski poker (1988)
- Panny i wdowy (1991)
- Szczęśliwego Nowego Jorku (1997)
- Haker (2002)
- Cudownie ocalony (2004)
- Królewska ruletka (2004)
- Lekarz drzew (2005)

=== Actor ===
- Palec boży (1972)
- Zdjęcia próbne (1976)
- Mniejsze niebo (1980)
- Piłkarski poker (1988)

=== Writer ===
- Na dobranoc (1970)
- Pokój z widokiem na morze (1977)
- Zezem (1976) – TV series
- Jezioro Bodeńskie (1985)
- Szczęśliwego Nowego Jorku (1997)
- Haker (2002)
- Lekarz drzew (2005)

== Awards ==
Janusz Zaorski awards
Festival
Year	Nominated work	Award	Result	Note
38th Berlin International Film Festival
1988	Matka Królów (1982)	FIPRESCI Prize - Honorable Mention	Won	
1988	Matka Królów (1982)	Silver Berlin Bear: Outstanding Single Achievement	Won	"For the mastery of visual language in the context of a tragic historic era."
1988	Matka Królów (1982)	Golden Berlin Bear	Nominated	
Locarno International Film Festival
1978	Pokój z widokiem na morze (1977)	Silver Leopard	Won	
1986	Jezioro Bodeńskie (1985)	Golden Leopard	Won	
Polish Film Festival
1975	Awans (1974)	Special Jury Prize	Won	
1985	Baryton (1984)	Silver Lion	Won	Tied with Jestem przeciw (1985) and Cztery pory roku (1985).
1987	Matka Królów (1982)	Golden Lion	Won	
1997	Szczęśliwego Nowego Jorku (1997)	Best Director	Won	
