= Cezary Morawski =

Polish actor

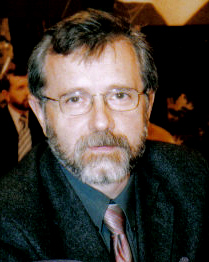
- Born: 5 June 1954 (age 72); Szczecin, Poland
- Education: The Aleksander Zelwerowicz National Academy of Dramatic Art in Warsaw
- Occupation: Actor
- Awards: Order of Polonia Restituta

Cezary Morawski (born 5 June 1954 in Szczecin) is a Polish film, theatre and television actor, as well as a voiceover provider for film dubbing and video games.

== Biography ==
He is the son of the Polish actor Tomasz Morawski. In 1977 he graduated from the Aleksander Zelwerowicz National Academy of Dramatic Art in Warsaw. He is linked with two theatres in Warsaw – the Contemporary Theatre and the Common Theatre (Powszechny in pol.). He is also a lecturer at his alma mater.

In 2000 he was awarded the Order of Polonia Restituta for his achievements in social activities and charity for the artistic community. For his role in the play My Soul (Moja Dusza in pol.) he was handed, by President Lech Walesa, the honorary title of the Ambassador of the Siberians awarded by the World Congress of Siberians. Morawski is also one of the heroes in the book "The Power of everyday life" – Siła codzienności.

He is married to a Polish actress.

== Filmography ==
- Głosy (1980) as Misza

== Bibliography ==
- Cezary Morawski at IMDb
- Cezary Morawski on Filmweb.pl (pol.)
- Cezary Morawski on filmpolski.pl (pol.)
- Cezary Morawski on stopklatka.pl (pol.)
- Cezary Morawski na zdjęciach in the Polish National Film Archives (pol.)
