= Dekalog: One =

1989 Film directed by Krzysztof Kieślowski

- Directed by: Krzysztof Kieślowski
- Written by: Krzysztof Kieślowski; Krzysztof Piesiewicz
- Produced by: Ryszard Chutkovski; Yoram Globus
- Starring: Henryk Baranowski; Wojciech Klata; Maja Komorowska
- Cinematography: Wieslaw Zdort
- Edited by: Ewa Smal
- Music by: Zbigniew Preisner
- Distributed by: Polish Television
- Release date: September 1989 (Venice)
- Running time: 53 minutes
- Country: Poland
- Language: Polish
- Budget: $10,000

Dekalog: One (Polish: Dekalog, jeden) is the first part of Dekalog, the drama series of films directed by Polish director Krzysztof Kieślowski for television, possibly connected to the first and second imperatives of the Ten Commandments: "I am the Lord your God; you shall have no other gods before me" and "Thou shalt not make unto thee any graven image."

A university professor (Henryk Baranowski) trains his young son in the use of reason and the scientific method, but is confronted with the unpredictability of fate. Reason is defied with tragic results.

The ten-part Dekalog series was exhibited in its entirety at the 46th Venice International Film Festival in September 1989, in the Special Events section. Dekalog: Seven premiered on Polish Television on 10 December 1989.

== Plot ==
Krzysztof lives alone with Paweł, his 12-year-old and highly intelligent son, and introduces him to the world of personal computers. They have several PCs in their flat and do many experiments with programming such as opening/closing the doors or turning on/off the tap water with help of the PC.

One cold winter morning Paweł asks his father to give him a physics problem to solve. Krzysztof does so and Paweł solves it very quickly on his computer. Later Paweł becomes depressed at the sight of a stray dead dog and begins to wonder about deeper things in life. When asked about the nature of death, his father gives him an explanation of death as the ending of all vital functions.

A TV crew comes to Paweł's school and takes several shots of Paweł and his schoolmates for their story on the poor quality of milk in public schools. Paweł creates a program that allows him to know what his mother is doing (she appears to be living on a different continent, since the program also calculates time zone differences), but the computer is unable to answer as to what she dreams. Irene, however, Paweł's aunt, answers easily: she dreams of Paweł. Paweł also believes that his father's computer must know his mother's dreams. Paweł talks to his aunt about what his father said about death; she elaborates on that and talks about the soul and religion. Irene and Krzysztof discuss Paweł's decision to take religious courses at the local church.

One day when arriving home, Krzysztof and Paweł notice that Krzysztof's computer turned itself on. Paweł and his father use the computer to calculate if it is possible for him to skate on the ice, to see whether it would hold him. After filling in the data into the computer, the PC says that the expected ice would hold many times Paweł's weight. Krzysztof even goes to the lake and corroborates that the ice is strong enough to hold him.

Paweł finds a pair of skates, meant to be a Christmas gift, under the couch, and wants to try them on the lake not far away from their home. His father gives his permission because the computer tells him the ice will be thick enough to withstand three times the boy's weight. The father puts his faith in the power of scientific computations. The next day, Krzysztof hears firemen's sirens going off and people rushing to the lake. Later the mother of a classmate of Paweł's comes distraught to Krzysztof; the English lesson where Paweł was supposed to be was cancelled due to the teacher's illness and due to the ice on the lake apparently having broken. Krzysztof remains calm at first and refuses to believe that the ice could have broken, since his calculations clearly indicated that this was not possible. After searching all around the neighborhood he gets confirmation from one of Paweł's friends that Paweł was skating at the time of the accident.

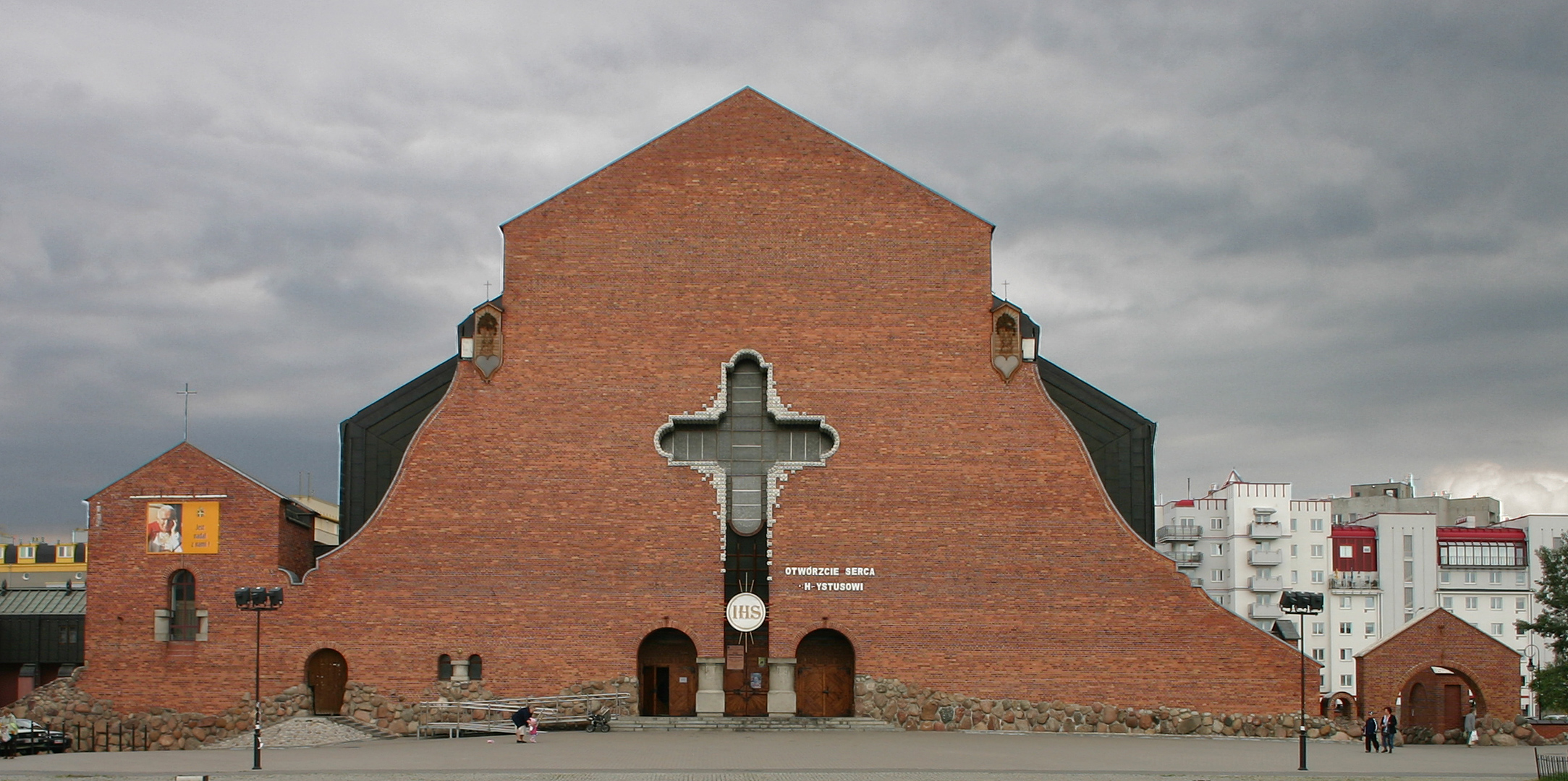
The Church Wniebowstąpienia Pańskiego (Ascension of the Lord) in Warsaw

Irene and Krzysztof are desperate when the rescue services recover corpses from the freezing water (Paweł is not specifically shown to be among them, but Krzysztof and Irene's reaction seems to indicate as such). Krzysztof returns home to find that his computer has turned itself on again, indicating that it is ready. Krzysztof later walks into a provisional church, destroying a small altar to the Black Madonna of Częstochowa, in the process knocking over a candle that drips wax onto the icon's face, making it appear to be crying. The film ends as Krzysztof, in tears, sinks to his knees and tries to cross himself with holy water on his forehead, but the water is frozen.

== Cast ==
- Henryk Baranowski - Krzysztof: an atheist, professor of linguistics at the university.
- Wojciech Klata - Paweł: Krzysztof's 12-year-old son.
- Maja Komorowska - Irena: Krzysztof's sister, she deeply believes in God and does not understand her brother much but they respect each other and have in common their love for little Paweł.
- Artur Barciś - man in the sheepskin
- Maria Gładkowska - English teacher
- Agnieszka Brustman – chess player
- Ewa Kania - Ewa Jezierska
- Aleksandra Kisielewska - woman
- Aleksandra Majsiuk - Ola
- Magda Sroga-Mikołajczyk - journalist

=== Extras ===
- Anna Smal-Romańska
- Maciej Sławiński,
- Piotr Wyrzykowski
- Bożena Wróbel
