= Juliusz Wyrzykowski =

Polish movie and stage actor

- Born: Juliusz Wyrzykowski; 6 June 1946; Warsaw, Poland
- Died: 18 November 2002 (aged 56); Warsaw, Poland
- Resting place: Powązki Cemetery
- Education: National Academy of Dramatic Art
- Occupation: Actor
- Years active: 1957–2002

Juliusz Wyrzykowski (6 June 1946 – 18 November 2002) was a Polish movie and stage actor.

== Biography ==
Juliusz Wyrzykowski was born on 6 June 1946 in Warsaw. He was the son of actors Marian Wyrzykowski and Elżbieta Barszczewska. In 1957 he made his debut in the movie King Maciuś I as the title character. In 1971 he graduated National Academy of Dramatic Art in Warsaw and for the whole professional life he was associated with Polish Theatre in Warsaw. He died on 18 November 2002 in Warsaw.

== Filmography ==
=== Movie ===
- 1957: King Maciuś I – Maciuś I
- 1976: Bezkresne łąki – Karol
- 1985: Głód – father of Joachim
- 1989: Stan strachu – actor
- 1992: Wszystko, co najważniejsze – music teacher

=== TV Theatre ===
- 1971: Szafir jak diament – physician
- 1972: Otworzyć serce – patient
- 1974: Wszystko dobre, co się dobrze kończy – page-boy
- 1975: Zawodowy gość – news vendor
- 1975: Pogrążyć się w mroku – mechanic
- 1975: Piknik – Bomba
- 1976: Wystarczy jeden telefon – Gabi
- 1981: The Wedding – devil
- 1990: Człowiek z budki suflera – waiter
- 1995: Paths of Glory – captain Tanon

=== TV-Serie ===
- 1986: Zmiennicy (episode 10: Krzyk ciszy) – Turkish writer
- 1991: Pogranicze w ogniu (episode 11) – expert
- 1994: Zespół adwokacki (episode 9) – judge regarding to Kudela vs Chmielnik
- 1994: Spółka rodzinna (episode 3) – Krzak
- 1996: Dom (episode 14: Ta mała wiolonczelistka) – a man in train

=== Documentary film ===
- 1983: Na odsiecz Wiedniowi – sekretary of Palavicini

=== Other works ===
- 1990: Na czysto
