= Warszawa. Année 5703 =

Warszawa. Année 5703 (English: Warsaw. Year 5703) is a 1992 French romantic drama film directed by Janusz Kijowski. It is about a couple in their 20s who flee the fall of the Warsaw Ghetto. The film stars Lambert Wilson, Hanna Schygulla and Julie Delpy.
