= Without Anesthesia =

- Directed by: Andrzej Wajda
- Written by: Agnieszka Holland; Andrzej Wajda
- Starring: Zbigniew Zapasiewicz; Ewa Dalkowska; Andrzej Seweryn; Krystyna Janda
- Cinematography: Edward Klosinski
- Edited by: Halina Prugar-Ketling
- Music by: Jerzy Derfel
- Release date: November 27, 1978
- Running time: 131 minutes
- Country: Poland
- Language: Polish

Without Anesthesia (alternative English title: Rough Treatment) is the English-language title for the Polish film Bez znieczulenia, released in 1978, directed by Andrzej Wajda. It was entered in the 1979 Cannes Film Festival.

According to the screenplay, Without Anesthesia takes place in the 1960s. Jerzy (Zbigniew Zapasiewicz), a well-known journalist and foreign correspondent who reports on wars, revolutions and guerrilla movements in the third world, is a man whose personal life and career are falling apart.

The main character is based on Ryszard Kapuściński, the prominent Polish journalist and author of the "reportage" school.

== Cast ==
- Zbigniew Zapasiewicz – Jerzy Michalowski
- Ewa Dalkowska – Ewa Michalowska
- Andrzej Seweryn – Jerzy Rosciszewski
- Krystyna Janda – Agata
- Emilia Krakowska – Wanda Jakowicz
- Roman Wilhelmi – Bronski
- Kazimierz Kaczor – Editor-in-chief
- Iga Mayr – Ewa's Mother
- Aleksandra Jasienska – Olenka
- Maria Salinger – Gabcia
- Stefania Iwinska – Józefa
- Halina Golanko – Halina Lukasik
- Jerzy Stuhr – Jerzy Porebowicz
- Magda Teresa Wójcik – Joanna Cichon
- Danuta Balicka-Satanowska – Judge

== See also ==
- Cinema of Poland
- List of Polish language films
