= Andrzej Szczepkowski =

Polish actor

- Andrzej Szczepkowski
- Born: 26 April 1923; Sucha Beskidzka, Poland
- Died: 31 January 1997 (aged 73); Warsaw, Poland
- Occupation: Actor
- Years active: 1957–1997

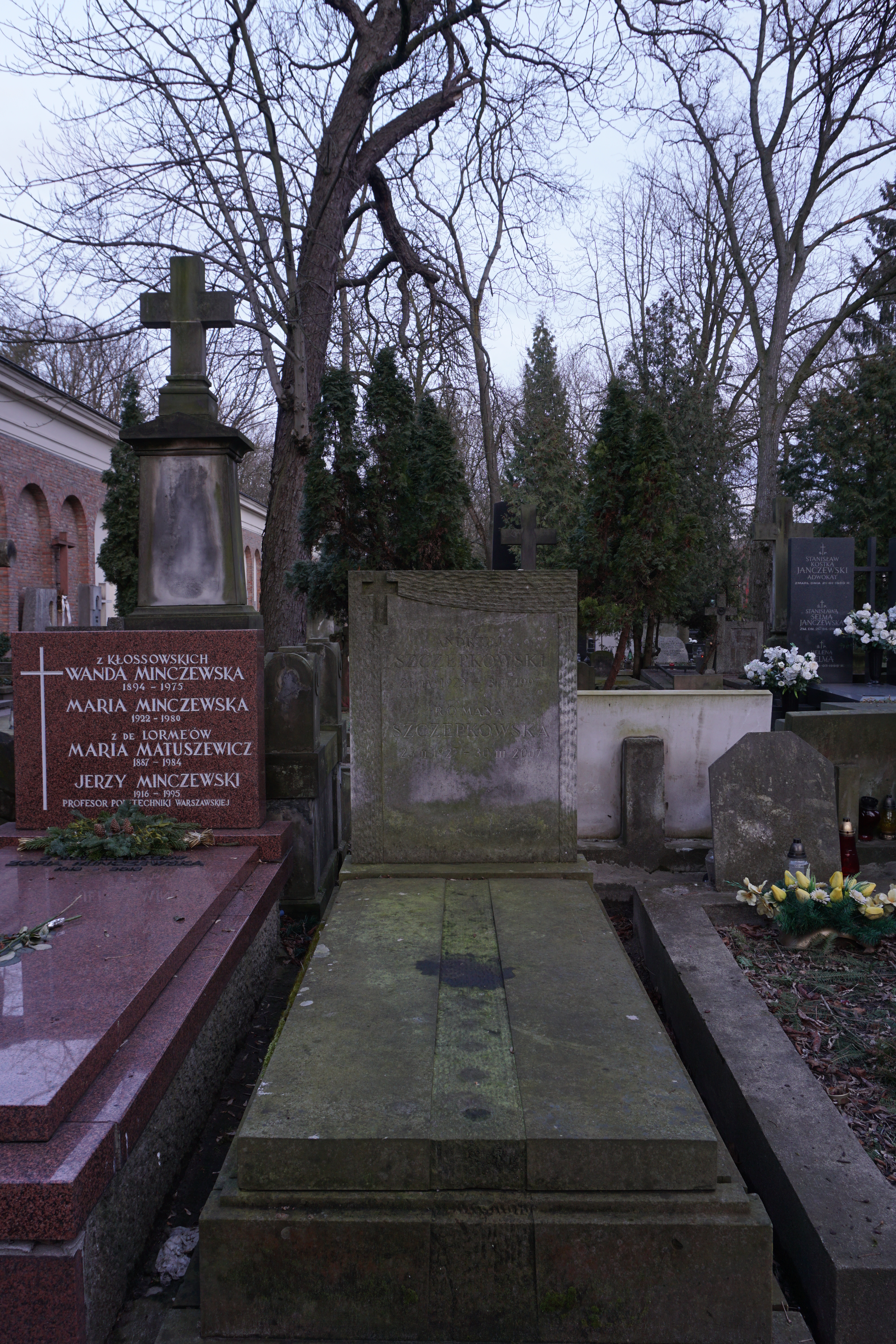
Grave of Andrzej Szczepkowski at the Powązki Cemetery in Warsaw

Andrzej Tadeusz Szczepkowski (26 April 1923 – 31 January 1997) was a Polish actor. He appeared in more than 30 films and television shows between 1957 and 1997.

He is the father of actress Joanna Szczepkowska. In 1966, he was awarded the Commander's Cross of the Order of Polonia Restituta.

Szczepkowski is buried at the Powązki Cemetery in Warsaw.

== Partial filmography ==
- Kapelusz pana Anatola (1957) - Gang Member
- Deszczowy lipiec (1958) - Wacek
- Kalosze szczęścia (1958) - Giddy Actor
- Żołnierz królowej Madagaskaru (1958) - Wladyslaw Macki
- Pan Anatol szuka miliona (1959) - Bandit Chief
- Historia żółtej ciżemki (1961) - bandit 'Czarny Rafal'
- The Two Who Stole the Moon - Narrator (voice)
- Wielka, większa i największa (1963) - Ika's Father
- Mansarda (1963) - St. Witkiewicz
- Zacne grzechy (1963) - Przeor Ignacy
- Panienka z okienka (1964) - Jan Heweliusz
- Pingwin (1965) - Architect Paweł Baczek, Adaś's Father
- Pieklo i niebo (1966) - Franciszek
- Colonel Wolodyjowski (1969) - Bishop Lanckoronski
- Epilog norymberski (1971)
- The Wedding (1973) - Nose
- Niebieskie jak Morze Czarne (1973) - Director Puc
- Nights and Days (1975) - Wacław Holszański
- Obrazki z zycia (1976) - Advocate
- Sprawa Gorgonowej (1977) - Woźniakowski
- Pasja (1978) - Wodzicki
- Sto koni do stu brzegów (1979)
- Sekret Enigmy (1979) - Col. Gustave Bertrand
- Jezioro Bodenskie (1986) - Thomson
- The Young Magician (1987) - Headmaster
- The Tribulations of Balthazar Kober (1988) - Le cardinal / Kardinal Nenni
- Rajski ptak (1988) - Profesor
- Dotknięci (1989) - Priest Karol
- Life for Life: Maximilian Kolbe (1991) - Górecki
- Argument About Basia (1995) - Antoni Walicki
- Towar (2006)
