= Mateusz Kijowski =

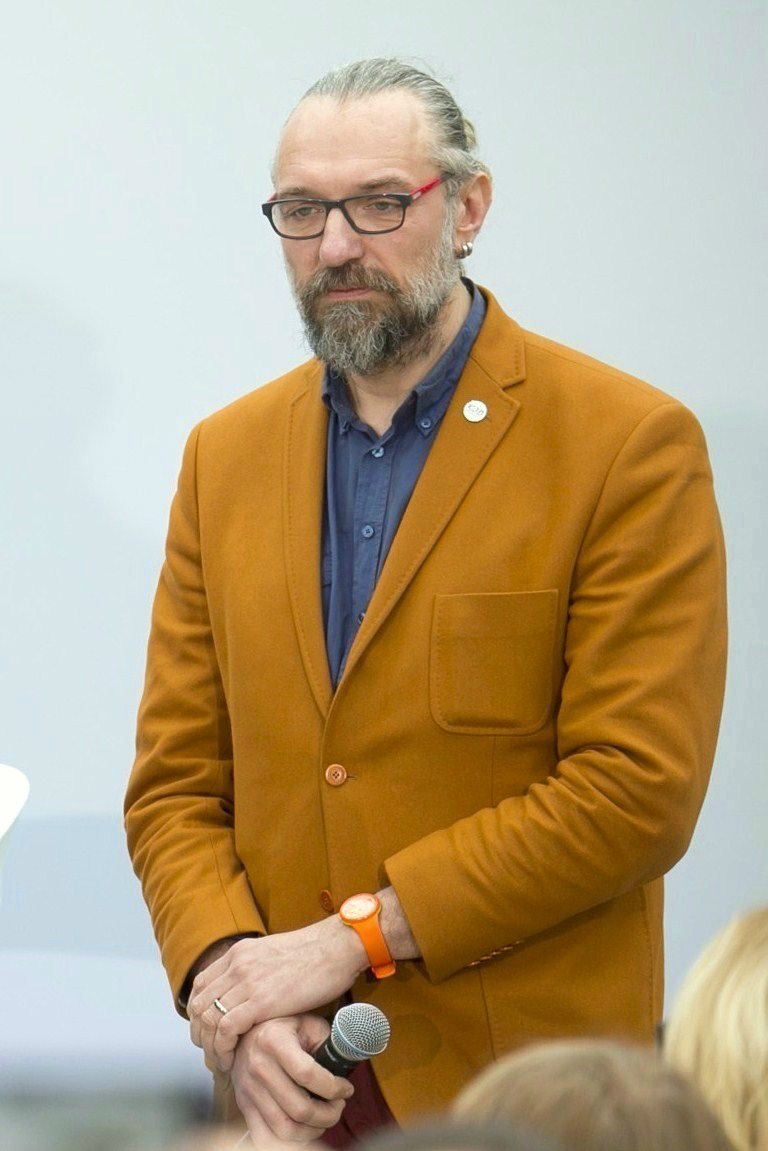
- Born: December 12, 1968 (age 57); Warsaw
- Known for: Committee for the Defense of Democracy

Mateusz Kijowski (born 12 December 1968) is an IT specialist, journalist, social activist, and blogger.

== Life and activism ==
Born in Warsaw, Poland, Kijowski studied mathematics at the University of Warsaw. He transferred to Faculty of Family Sciences (Polish: Instytut Studiów nad Rodziną) at the Cardinal Stefan Wyszyński University in Warsaw (former Warsaw Theological Academy). After one year he transferred yet again, this time, to study Journalism. He dropped out from university and started working at a clothing company, designing outdoor recreation gear. In 1991, he started working in the IT Department of the Polish daily Gazeta Wyborcza. At the end of 1993 he was hired by Computer Education Center (Polish: Centrum Edukacji Komputerowej), where he was training network administrators. In year 2000 he graduated from College of Management (Polish: Wyższa Szkoła Zarządzania) at the Polish Open University with a degree in business information management. He wrote his thesis on stochastic volume oscillators.

He started his activist efforts in a tourism organization at his parish. He was active in the father’s rights movement, he was one of organizers of the campaign “stopstopnop” polemicizing with opponents of mandatory vaccinations for newborn children. He was the co-founder of an organization, Stop Rape (Polish: Stop gwałtom).

At the onset of the Polish constitutional crisis, 2015 he started a Facebook group Committee for the Defense of Democracy (Polish: Komitet Obrony Demokracji, also known as KOD), within three days after 20 November 2015 there were over thirty thousand members. On 2 December 2015, in Warsaw, the first founding meeting of the Association Committee for the Defense of Democracy (KOD) took place. A new statute was approved and a temporary management group was formed with Kijowski in it. During the process of forming the Association, several threats toward Kijowski surfaced and the police started protecting him.

On 3 December 2015 he organised a picket in support of the Constitutional Tribunal’s actions to ensure the rule of law in Poland. Subsequent protests took place on 12 December in Warsaw and on 19 December in more than 20 Polish cities and several European capitals. On 23 December he presented the outline of a compromise “exit strategy” at a press conference in Warsaw.

In December 2015 he was awarded the "Freedom Prize" by Towarzystwo Dziennikarskie in recognition of his civic activity, in particular for the swift organization of peaceful protests in defence of democracy and civil rights in Poland.

Mateusz Kijowski is son of Jerzy Kijowski, he has four children and was married twice.

== Controversies ==
Since the foundation of KOD Kijowski was being accused of having fallen behind with child support payments prior to starting the organization. On 4 January 2017 it was revealed that Kijowski had a potential conflict of interest, as while serving as the leader of KOD, between March and August 2016, his company "MTM" billed the organization monthly for IT services. Following this revelation the KOD Board initiated an external financial audit, with many KOD members demanding for Kijowski to step down.

In June 2018, the trial of former KOD leaders - Mateusz Kijowski and treasurer Piotr Chabora - began in the District Court in Pruszków. They were accused of misappropriation of PLN 121,000 from public collections of the CODE on the basis of fictitious invoices for IT services of Mateusz Kijowski.
