= Marian Wyrzykowski =

Polish theatre actor

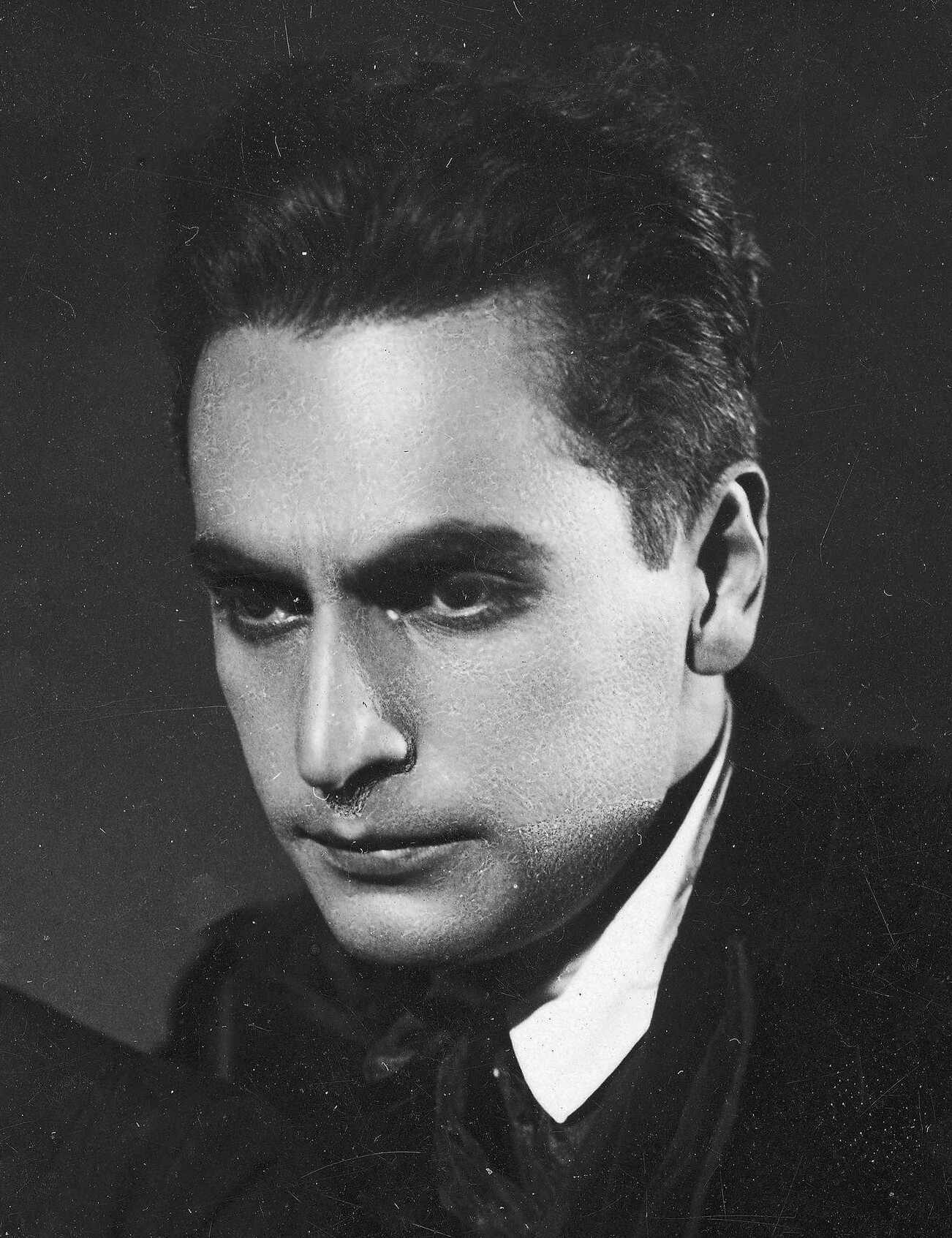
- The grave of Marian Wyrzykowski at the Powązki Cemetery in Warsaw
- Born: April 5, 1904; Chotomów, Poland
- Died: April 23, 1970 (aged 66); Warsaw, Poland
- Occupation: Actor
- Years active: 1947-1953
- Spouse(s): Elżbieta Barszczewska; Halina Kossobudzka
- Children: Juliusz Wyrzykowski

Marian Wyrzykowski (1904-1970) was a Polish theater actor.
