= Jerzy Juliusz Kijowski =

Polish physicist

Jerzy Juliusz Kijowski (born 4 May 1943 in Lublin) is a polish physicist, professor of physical sciences who specializes in physics, mathematics, classical and quantum field theory, and theory of gravity.

== Life and works ==
Graduated from Faculty of Physics of University of Warsaw In 1965. Then, at the same university he was granted a PhD in 1969 and habilitation 1973. On 17 September 1982 he was awarded the title of Professor of Physical Sciences. He is a theoretical physicist, professionally associated with the Centre for Theoretical Physics in Warsaw. He is also a professor of the Faculty of Mathematics and Natural Sciences Cardinal Stefan Wyszynski University in Warsaw and a visiting professor at universities in Cologne, Leipzig, Turin, Milan, Rome (Sapienza University of Rome), Marseille, Tours, Louvain-la-Neuve and polytechnics in Aachen (RWTH, Rheinisch-Westfälische Technische Hochschule Aachen) and Claushal (Technische Universität Clausthal). From 1980–1985 he was a deputy director of the CFT PAN, in 1991–1992, he was the director of this center and, in 1996–1999, he held the position of the Head of the Department of Mathematical Methods in Physics, University of Warsaw.

Scientific achievements of Professor Kijowski include the introduction of operator 'transition time' in Quantum mechanics, new interpretation of uncertainty principle for the time and energy, providing a new, completely original variational principle for Einstein equations and the discovery of the affine, variational principle for General Relativity Theory, as well as providing new, original positivity proof for gravitational energy.

He was awarded several scientific awards, including: Award of the Polish Mathematical Society for a young mathematician (1969), the Zaremba Prize in applied mathematics (1972), the Award of Division III of the Polish Academy of Sciences (1980), and the "Master" award of the Foundation for Polish Science (1999–2003).

In the years 1976–1977 he was awarded the Alexander-von-Humboldt Research Grant by Humboldt Foundation (Germany).

He is a member of the editorial boards for Reports on Mathematical Physics, Acta Physica Polonica, and the co-founder and member of the editorial board of the Journal of Geometry and Physics.

== Books ==
- 2015: Geometria różniczkowa jako narzędzie nauk przyrodniczych. Warsaw University of Technology. ISBN 978-83-6199313-1
