= The Double Life of Veronique =

1991 film by Krzysztof Kieślowski

- Theatrical release poster
- French: La double vie de Véronique
- Directed by: Krzysztof Kieślowski
- Written by: Krzysztof Kieślowski; Krzysztof Piesiewicz
- Produced by: Leonardo De La Fuente
- Starring: Irène Jacob; Philippe Volter; Sandrine Dumas; Aleksander Bardini; Louis Ducreux; Claude Duneton; Halina Gryglaszewska; Kalina Jędrusik
- Cinematography: Sławomir Idziak
- Edited by: Jacques Witta
- Music by: Zbigniew Preisner
- Production companies: Sidéral Productions; Studio Tor; Le Studio Canal+; Norsk Film
- Distributed by: Sidéral Films (France)
- Release dates: 15 May 1991 (France); 20 September 1991 (Norway); 6 October 1991 (Poland)
- Running time: 98 minutes
- Countries: France; Poland; Norway
- Languages: French; Polish
- Box office: $2 million

The Double Life of Veronique (French: La double vie de Véronique, Polish: Podwójne życie Weroniki) is a 1991 drama film directed by Krzysztof Kieślowski, and starring Irène Jacob and Philippe Volter. Written by Kieślowski and Krzysztof Piesiewicz, the film explores the themes of identity, love, and human intuition through the characters of Weronika, a Polish choir soprano, and her double, Véronique, a French music teacher. Despite not knowing each other, the two women share a mysterious and emotional bond that transcends language and geography.

The Double Life of Veronique was Kieślowski's first film produced partly outside his native Poland. It won the Prize of the Ecumenical Jury and the FIPRESCI Prize at the 1991 Cannes Film Festival, as well as the Best Actress award for Jacob. Although selected as the Polish entry for the Best Foreign Language Film at the 64th Academy Awards, it was not accepted as a nominee.

== Plot ==
In 1968, a Polish girl looks at the winter stars, while in France, another girl sees the first leaf of spring. In 1990, Weronika, a young Polish woman, sings in an outdoor concert with her choir when a rainstorm interrupts the performance. That night, she has sex with her boyfriend, Antek, and leaves the next day for Kraków to visit her sick aunt. She tells her father that she has a strange feeling of not being alone.

In Kraków, Weronika joins a local choir and auditions for a solo part. She is selected, and the opportunity makes her happy. While walking through the Main Square, she notices a French tourist who looks identical to her, taking photographs before boarding a bus. During the concert where she is to sing the solo, Weronika collapses onstage and dies from cardiac arrest.

That same day in Clermont-Ferrand, France, Véronique feels sudden sadness after having sex with her boyfriend. She later tells her music teacher that she is quitting the choir. At school, she attends a marionette performance with her students and leads them in a musical piece by the 18th-century composer Van den Budenmayer—the same music Weronika sang before her death. That night, Véronique sees a puppeteer at a traffic light signaling to her not to light the wrong end of her cigarette.

Later, she receives a phone call with no voice, only choir music. She visits her father the next day and tells him that she feels she has lost someone, though she does not know who. Soon, Véronique receives a package containing a shoelace. She later identifies the puppeteer as Alexandre Fabbri, a children's book author. She reads several of his books before receiving another package from her father, which contains a cassette tape. The tape includes various sounds: a typewriter, a train station, footsteps, and a fragment of Van den Budenmayer's music.

The envelope's postage stamp leads her to Gare Saint-Lazare in Paris. At a café in the station, Véronique finds Alexandre, who tells her that he sent the packages as an experiment to see if she would come. She is upset and leaves to check into a nearby hotel. Alexandre follows her and apologizes. They later have sex.

The next morning, Véronique tells Alexandre that she has always felt like she was in two places at once and that something has been influencing her life. She shows him photos from her recent trip to Poland. Alexandre comments on her appearance in one of the photos, but she tells him it is not her. However, when she examines the image more closely, Véronique realises the other women is identical to her and was looking at her on the bus. She becomes emotional and weeps. Alexandre consoles her which leads them to having sex again.

Later, Véronique visits Alexandre and sees him working on two marionettes that resemble her. He explains that he needs a second puppet as a backup in case one is damaged. He demonstrates how to operate the marionette while the duplicate remains on the table. Alexandre reads from his new book, which is about two women born on the same day in different places who share a mysterious connection.

Later, Véronique goes to her father's house. She stops at the gate and touches an old tree trunk. Inside the house, her father seems to sense her presence.

== Cast ==
- Irène Jacob as Weronika and Véronique (Note: Irène Jacob's voice was overdubbed by Anna Gornostaj for the Polish dialogue.)
- Halina Gryglaszewska as the aunt
- Kalina Jędrusik as the gaudy woman
- Aleksander Bardini as the orchestra conductor
- Władysław Kowalski as Weronika's father
- Jerzy Gudejko as Antek
- Jan Sterniński as the lawyer
- Philippe Volter as Alexandre Fabbri
- Sandrine Dumas as Catherine
- Louis Ducreux as the professor
- Claude Duneton as Véronique's father
- Lorraine Evanoff as Claude
- Guillaume de Tonquédec as Serge
- Gilles Gaston-Dreyfus as Jean-Pierre
- Alain Frérot as the postman
- Youssef Hamid as the railroader
- Thierry de Carbonnières as the teacher
- Chantal Neuwirth as the receptionist
- Nausicaa Rampony as Nicole
- Boguslawa Schubert as the woman in the hat
- Jacques Potin as the man in the gray coat

== Production ==
=== Filming style ===
The film incorporates a strong metaphysical element, yet the supernatural aspect of the story remains unexplained. Similar to Three Colours: Blue, Preisner's musical score plays a significant role in the plot and is credited to the fictional Van den Budenmayer. The cinematography is highly stylized, utilizing color and camera filters to create an ethereal atmosphere. Sławomir Idziak, the cinematographer, had previously experimented with these techniques in an episode of Dekalog, while Kieślowski expanded on the use of color for a wider range of effects in his Three Colours trilogy. Kieślowski had previously explored the concept of different life paths for the same individual in his Polish film, Przypadek (Blind Chance). The central choice faced by Weronika/Véronique is based on a brief subplot in the ninth episode of Dekalog.

=== Filming locations ===
The film was shot at locations including Clermont-Ferrand, Kraków and Paris.

=== Alternative ending ===
In November 2006, a Criterion Collection region 1 DVD was released in the United States and Canada, which includes an alternative ending that Kieślowski changed in the edit at the request of Harvey Weinstein of Miramax for the American release. Kieślowski added four brief shots to the end of the film, which show Véronique's father emerging from the house and Véronique running across the yard to embrace him. The final image of the father and daughter embracing is shot from inside the house through a window.

=== Music ===
Zbigniew Preisner composed the score; however, in the film, the music is attributed to a fictitious 18th-century Dutch composer named Van den Budenmayer, who was created by Preisner and Kieślowski for use in screenplays.

Music credited to this imaginary composer also appears in Kieślowski's Dekalog (1988) and Three Colours: Blue (1993). In the latter, a theme from Van den Budenmayer's musique funebres is quoted in the Song for the Unification of Europe, and the E minor soprano solo is foreshadowed in Weronika's final performance.

=== Puppetry ===
The puppet acts were performed by American puppeteer and sculptor Bruce Schwartz. Unlike most puppeteers who usually hide their hands in gloves or use strings or sticks, Schwartz shows his hands while performing.

== Reception ==
=== Critical response ===
The Double Life of Veronique received mostly positive reviews. In her review in Not Coming to a Theater Near You, Jenny Jediny wrote, "In many ways, The Double Life of Veronique is a small miracle of cinema; ... Kieslowski's strong, if largely post-mortem reputation among the art house audience has elevated a film that makes little to no sense on paper, while its emotional tone strikes a singular—perhaps perfect—key."

In his review in The Washington Post, Hal Hinson called the film "a mesmerizing poetic work composed in an eerie minor key." Noting that the effect on the viewer is subtle but very real, Hinson concluded, "The film takes us completely into its world, and in doing so, it leaves us with the impression that our own world, once we return to it, is far richer and portentous than we had imagined." Hinson was particularly impressed with Jacob's performance:

This is an actress with an uncanny openness and vulnerability to the camera. She's beautiful, but in a completely unconventional way, and she has such changeable features that our interest is never exhausted. What's remarkable about her performance is how quiet it is; as an actress, she seems to work almost off the decibel scale. And yet she is remarkably alive on screen, remarkably present. She's a rare combination—a sexy yet soulful actress.

In her review in The New York Times, Caryn James wrote, "Veronique is poetic in the truest sense, relying on images that can't be turned into prosaic statements without losing something of their essence. The film suggests mysterious connections of personality and emotion, but it was never meant to yield any neat, summary idea about the two women's lives."

In his review in the Chicago Sun-Times, Roger Ebert wrote, "The movie has a hypnotic effect. We are drawn into the character, not kept at arm's length with a plot." Ebert singled out Sławomir Idziak's innovative use of color and cinematography:

This is one of the most beautiful films I've seen. The cinematographer, Slawomir Idziak, finds a glow in Irene Jacob's pre-Raphaelite beauty. He uses a rich palette, including insistent reds and greens that don't "stand" for anything but have the effect of underlining the other colors. The other color, blending with both, is golden yellow, and then there are the skin tones. Jacob, who was 24 when the film was made, has a flawless complexion that the camera lingers near to. Her face is a template waiting for experience to be added.

In 2009, Ebert added The Double Life of Veronique to his Great Movies list. Krzysztof Kieślowski's Dekalog and The Three Colours Trilogy are also on the list.

In his review for Empire magazine, David Parkinson called it "a film of great fragility and beauty, with the delicacy of the puppet theatre." He thought the film was "divinely photographed" by Slawomir Idziak, and praised Irène Jacob's performance as "simply sublime and thoroughly merited the Best Actress prize at Cannes." Parkinson viewed the film as "compelling, challenging and irresistibly beautiful" and a "metaphysical masterpiece."

Elbert Ventura of AllMovie rated the film four out of five stars, calling it Kieślowski's "most ravishing film" and writing, "With its oblique story line, cryptic rhyming patterns, and focus on mood and tone, this elusive movie is more poem than narrative." In a five-star review of the DVD release of The Double Life of Veronique, Ivana Redwine of About.com described the film as "[c]aptivating" and "mesmerizing", while praising Jacob's performance as "superb". At BBC, Matthew Leyland gave the film three stars out of five and wrote, "It's a ravishingly pretty piece, but it may tax viewers searching for answers that remain out of reach." Peter Bradshaw of The Guardian gave the film five stars out of five.

On the review aggregator website Rotten Tomatoes, the film holds an approval rating of 86% based on 36 reviews, with an average rating of 7.7/10.

=== Box office performance ===
The film was the 50th highest-grossing film of the year with a total of 592,241 admissions in France. In North America the film opened on one screen grossing $8,572 its opening weekend. In total the film grossed $1,999,955 at the North American box office playing at a total of 22 theaters in its widest release which is a respectable result for a foreign art film.

== Home media ==
A digitally restored version of the film was released on DVD and Blu-ray by The Criterion Collection. The release includes audio commentary by Annette Insdorf, author of Double Lives, Second Chances: The Cinema of Krzysztof Kieślowski; three short documentary films by Kieślowski: Factory (1970), Hospital (1976), and Railway Station (1980); The Musicians (1958), a short film by Kieślowski's teacher Kazimierz Karabasz; Kieślowski's Dialogue (1991), a documentary featuring a candid interview with Kieślowski and rare behind-the-scenes footage from the set of The Double Life of Véronique; 1966-1988: Kieślowski, Polish Filmmaker, a 2005 documentary tracing the filmmaker's work in Poland, from his days as a student through The Double Life of Veronique; a 2005 interview with actress Irène Jacob; and new video interviews with cinematographer Slawomir Idziak and composer Zbigniew Preisner. It also includes a booklet featuring essays by Jonathan Romney, Slavoj Zizek, and Peter Cowie, and a selection from Kieślowski on Kieślowski.

=== Awards and nominations ===
- 1991 Cannes Film Festival Prize of the Ecumenical Jury (Krzysztof Kieślowski) Won
- 1991 Cannes Film Festival FIPRESCI Prize (Krzysztof Kieślowski) Won
- 1991 Cannes Film Festival Award for Best Actress (Irène Jacob) Won
- 1991 Cannes Film Festival nomination for the Golden Palm (Krzysztof Kieślowski)
- 1991 Los Angeles Film Critics Award for Best Music (Zbigniew Preisner) Won
- 1991 Warsaw International Film Festival Audience Award (Krzysztof Kieślowski) Won
- 1991 French Syndicate of Cinema Critics Award for Best Foreign Film Won
- 1992 César Awards Nomination for Best Actress (Irène Jacob)
- 1992 César Awards nomination for Best Music Written for a Film (Zbigniew Preisner)
- 1992 Golden Globe Awards nomination for Best Foreign Language Film
- 1992 Guldbagge Awards nomination for Best Foreign Film
- 1992 Independent Spirit Awards nomination for Best Foreign Film
- 1992 National Society of Film Critics Award for Best Foreign Language Film Won

In July 2021, the film was shown in the Cannes Classics section at the 2021 Cannes Film Festival.

== See also ==
- List of submissions to the 64th Academy Awards for Best Foreign Language Film
- List of Polish submissions for the Academy Award for Best Foreign Language Film
- Doppelgänger

== Bibliography ==
- Insdorf, Annette (1999). Double Lives, Second Chances: The Cinema of Krzysztof Kieślowski. New York: Hyperion. ISBN 0-7868-6562-8.
- Kieślowski, Krzysztof (1998). Stok, Danusia (ed.). Kieślowski on Kieślowski. London: Faber and Faber. ISBN 0-571-17328-4.
