= Nothing about us without us =

Political slogan originating in Central Europe

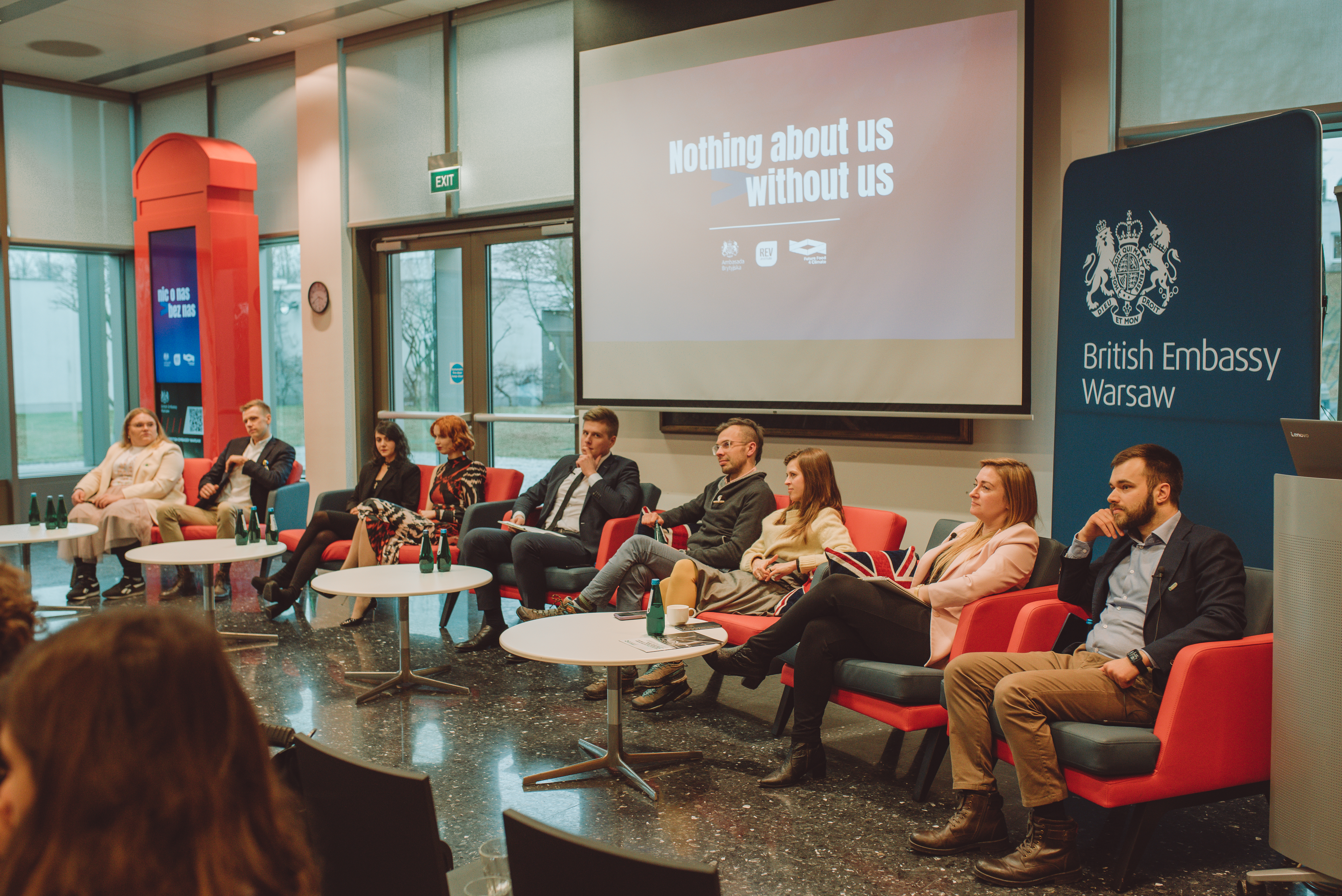
"Nothing about us without us" event at the British embassy in Warsaw, organised in 2023 by the Green Rev Institute

"Nothing about us without us" (Latin: Nihil de nobis, sine nobis) is a slogan used to communicate the idea that no policy should be decided by any representative without the full and direct participation of members of the group(s) affected by that policy. In its modern form, this often involves national, ethnic, disability-based, or other groups that are often marginalized from political, social, and economic opportunities.

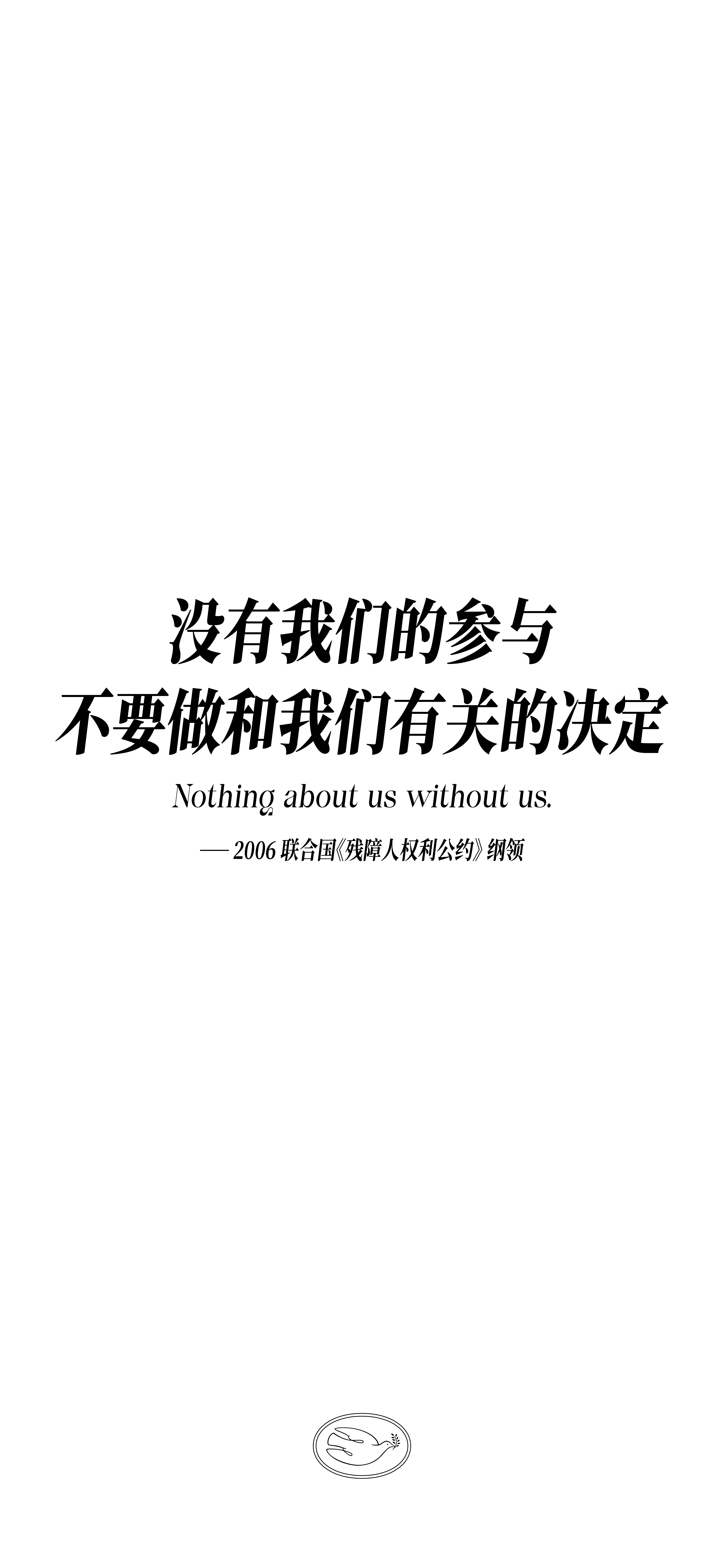
Chinese version of the slogan, literally 'Do not make any decisions involving us without our participation'

== History ==
The saying has its origins in Central European political traditions. It was the political motto that helped establish—and, loosely translated into Latin, provided the name for—Poland's 1505 constitutional legislation, Nihil novi, which first transferred governing authority from the monarch to the parliament. It subsequently became a byword for democratic norms. It is also a long-standing principle of Hungarian law and foreign policy, and was a cornerstone of the foreign policy of interwar Poland.

The phrase was used in Czechoslovakia as "About us, without us" (Czech: O nás, bez nás) to lament the Munich Agreement of 1938, which annexed the Sudetenland to Nazi Germany without the participation of Czechoslovakia.

More recently, the phrase "Nothing about Ukraine without Ukraine" has come into use in the context of the Russia-Ukraine War, stating the idea that no negotiations about Ukraine's status should take place without Ukraine's participation. Joe Biden and Olaf Scholz have both used the phrase in relation to the Ukraine war.

The phrase formed part of the title of Krzysztof Kieślowski's 1972 documentary Workers '71: Nothing About Us Without Us (Polish: Robotnicy '71: Nic o nas bez nas).

The term in its English form came into use during the 1990s when it was adopted in disability-activism circles. James Charlton relates that he first heard the term used in talks by South African disability activists Michael Masutha and William Rowland, who had in turn heard the phrase used by an unnamed Eastern European activist at an earlier international disability-rights conference. In 1998 Charlton used the saying as title for a book on disability rights. Disability-rights activist David Werner used the same title for another book, also published in 1998. In 2004 the United Nations used the phrase as the theme of International Day of Persons with Disabilities, and it is also associated with the Convention on the Rights of Persons with Disabilities.

Use of this slogan has expanded beyond the disability-rights community to other interest groups and movements. In 2021 the World Health Organization published an eponymous guide recommending that children and adolescents be involved in the decision-making process for health-related policies that affect young people.

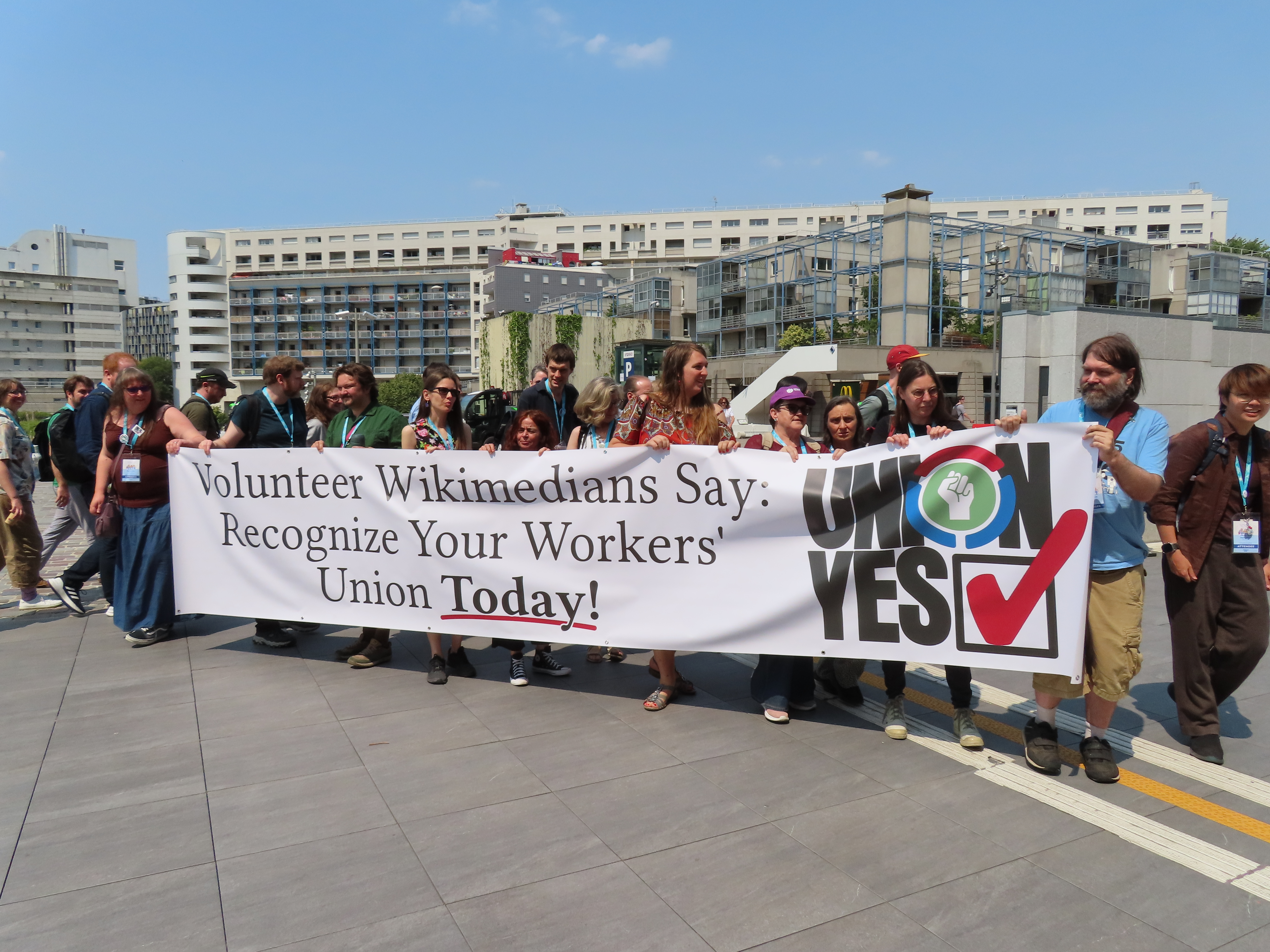
Supporters of Wiki Workers United, who believe in the principle of "nothing about us without us"

== See also ==
- Autonomy
- Disability studies
- Epistemic injustice
- Human rights
- Independent living
- Neurodiversity
- No taxation without representation
- The personal is political
- Self-determination
- Self-determination theory
