= Concert of Requests =

- Directed by: Krzysztof Kieślowski
- Written by: Krzysztof Kieślowski
- Starring: Ewa Konarska; Jerzy Fedorowicz
- Cinematography: Lechoslaw Trzesowski
- Release date: 1967
- Running time: 16 minutes
- Language: Polish

Concert of Requests Polish: Koncert życzeń is a 1967 short film by Polish director Krzysztof Kieślowski and starring Jerzy Fedorowicz, produced while Kieślowski was a student at the Łódź Film School. The film is included as an extra feature on the American DVD release of Kieślowski's No End and the Region 2 Artificial Eye (UK) release of The Scar.

The film follows a group of young people on a trip in the forest near Przewoz, Poland. They drink, smoke, listen to rock and roll music and drop litter before leaving in a bus. A young man and woman who had been camping leave on a motorcycle. The motorcycle passes the bus on the road, accidentally dropping their tent and the woman's identification card, and the bus stops to pick it up. The motorcyclists drive back to the stopped bus and ask for the tent. The bus driver agrees to return the tent only if the woman comes with them. She agrees, and the man retrieves the identification from the tent. Having taken the card, the man returns the tent and the woman leaves again with him on the motorcycle.
