= 7th European Film Awards =

1994 film awards ceremony in Germany

- Date: 27 November 1994
- Site: Spiegeltent, Berlin, Germany
- Hosted by: none
- Organized by: European Film Academy

Highlights
- Best Picture: Lamerica

The 7th European Film Awards were presented on 27 November 1994 in Berlin, Germany. The winners were selected by the members of the European Film Academy.

== Awards ==
=== Best Film ===
English title	Original title	Director(s)	Country
Lamerica		Gianni Amelio	Italy
In the Name of the Father	—N/a	Jim Sheridan	Ireland, United Kingdom
Three Colours: Blue, Three Colours: White, Three Colors: Red	Trois couleurs: Bleu, Trois couleurs: Blanc, Trois couleurs: Rouge	Krzysztof Kieślowski	France, Poland, Switzerland
Kosh ba kosh	Кош ба кош	Bakhtyar Khudojnazarov	Russia
Son of the Shark	Le Fils du requin	Agnès Merlet	France
Woyzeck	Woyzeck	János Szász	Hungary

=== Best Documentary ===
English title	Original title	Director(s)	Country
Angels of Sarajevo	Anđeli u Sarajevu	Saga-Group Sarajevo	Bosnia and Herzegovina

=== Lifetime Achievement Award ===
Recipient	Occupation
(France) Robert Bresson	film director
