= Curriculum vitae (disambiguation) =

A curriculum vitae is a summary of a person's career, qualifications and education.

Curriculum vitae may also refer to:

- Curriculum Vitae (album), a 2007 compilation album by Mo' Hits Records
- Curriculum Vitae (film), a 1975 polish film
- "Curriculum Vitae", a song in the 2005 studio album Robyn

== See also ==
- List of phrases containing the word vitae
