= Requiem for My Friend (Preisner) =

Album by Zbigniew Preisner

Requiem for My Friend is a major and the first non-film musical work composed by Zbigniew Preisner. The composition was meant to honour the composer's late friend, the director Krzysztof Kieślowski, with whom he collaborated while working on a number of films, including the famous Three Colours trilogy. The album was released in 1998, although some parts of the work must have been ready upon Kieślowski's passing in 1996, as Preisner asserted in an interview that "the Requiem had accompanied Krzysztof in his last journey".

"Lacrimosa", performed by Elżbieta Towarnicka, appeared in Terrence Malick's 2011 film The Tree of Life.

== Structure ==
=== Część I Requiem (Part one: "Requiem") ===
1. "Officium" – 03:46
2. "Kyrie eleison" – 06:12
3. "Dies irae" – 04:51
4. "Offertorium" – 3:19
5. "Sanctus" – 2:51
6. "Agnus Dei" – 1:49
7. "Lux aeterna" – 1:56
8. "Lacrimosa" – 3:24
9. "Epitaphium" – 03:03

=== Część II Życie (Part two: "Life") ===
==== Początek (Beginning) ====
1. "Spotkanie" ("Encounter") – 05:18
2. "Odkrywanie świata" ("Discovering of the world") – 02:50
3. "Miłość" ("Love") – 2:24

==== Przeznaczenie (Destiny) ====
1. "Kai Kairós — Jest Czas" ("There is time") – 09:43

==== Apokalipsa (Apocalypse) ====
1. "Ascende huc — Wstąp tutaj" – 02:18
2. "Veni et Vidi — Przyszedłem i ujrzałem" – 02:45
3. "Qui erat et qui est — Który był, który jest" – 04:26
4. "Lacrimosa — Czas płaczu" – 04:03

==== Postscriptum ====
1. "Modlitwa" ("Prayer") – 03:16
