= The Office (film) =

- Directed by: Krzysztof Kieślowski
- Written by: Krzysztof Kieślowski
- Cinematography: Lechoslaw Trzesowski
- Edited by: Janina Grosicka
- Release date: 1966
- Running time: 5 minutes
- Language: Polish

The Office (Polish: Urząd) is a 1966 short film by Polish director Krzysztof Kieślowski, produced while he was a student at the Łódź Film School. The film is included as an extra on the Region 1 and 2 releases of Kieślowski's feature film No End.

The film's runtime of 5 minutes consists entirely of interactions at a government office service window, with a clerk handling various requests by people seeking state aid. The film portrays the intense bureaucracy that existed in Polish government services at the time, with the people being turned away for various procedural violations. One request is denied because the applicant brought too many identifying documents, they were told that they needed an official nullification of one of the redundant papers. Another man encounters difficulty because a document was stamped with a square, rather than a round seal.

Chaitanya Tamhane took notations and hints from the film's composition of offices while making Court.
