= Tramway =

Tramway may refer to:

- Tramway (industrial), a lightly laid railway for uses such as logging or mining
- A tram transport system (public transport vehicles running on rails)
  - The tramway tracks which trams run on (also a section of reserved track for trams)
- Aerial tramway
- Tramway, North Carolina, locality in the United States
- Tramway (arts centre), for visual and performing arts in Glasgow, Scotland
- Tramway (film), a short film by Polish director Krzysztof Kieślowski
