= List of Tajikistani European Film Award winners and nominees =

This is a list of Tajikistani European Film Award winners and nominees. This list details the performances of Tajikistani actors, actresses, and films that have either been submitted or nominated for, or have won, a European Film Award.

== Main categories ==
Year	Award	Recipient	Status	Note
1994	Best Film	Kosh ba kosh	Nominated	Russian-German-Swiss-Japanese-Tajikistani coproduction

== See also ==
- List of Tajik submissions for the Academy Award for Best International Feature Film
