= No End (film) =

- Theatrical release poster
- Directed by: Krzysztof Kieślowski
- Written by: Krzysztof Kieślowski; Krzysztof Piesiewicz
- Produced by: Ryszard Chutkowski
- Starring: Grażyna Szapołowska; Maria Pakulnis; Aleksander Bardini
- Cinematography: Jacek Petrycki
- Edited by: Krystyna Rutkowska
- Music by: Zbigniew Preisner
- Release date: 17 June 1985
- Running time: 109 minutes
- Country: Poland
- Language: Polish

No End (Polish: Bez końca) is a 1985 film directed by Krzysztof Kieślowski and starring Grażyna Szapołowska, Maria Pakulnis, and Aleksander Bardini. The film is about the state of martial law in Poland after the banning of the trade union Solidarity in 1981. Kieślowski worked with several regular collaborators for the first time on No End.

== Plot ==
The ghost of Antek Zyro, an attorney, breaks the fourth wall, explaining he suffered a heart attack and died four days earlier. He leaves behind his wife, Urszula (nicknamed "Ula"), and his son Jacek. A month later, Ula receives a phone call from Joanna Stach, the wife of her husband's last client, Darek Stach. She requests the legal documents relating to her husband's case. Ula is at first unwilling to help, but then allows Joanna to peruse them. Ula sends Joanna to Mieczyslaw Labrador, an older lawyer Antek once clerked for.

Later that afternoon, Ula rummages through her husband's files, discovering nude photographs of herself with her face scissored out. She meets with Tomek, a friend of Antek's who explains Antek was anonymously sent the photos, which Ula posed for in her youth while needing money. Inside Antek's files, they find a small handwritten note, in which Darek requested Antek's legal representation after he was arrested for organizing for the Solidarity movement. Labrador meets with Darek in his prison cell, and they discuss the reasons behind his imprisonment. Labrador agrees to take Darek's case, hoping to present him as an activist who believes the Polish government needed political reform. However, Darek states he will start a hunger strike. At a Christmas party, Ula meets with Marta Duraj, who knew Antek fifteen years earlier, when they were law students.

At a hotel bar, Tomek confesses his love to Ula, but rushes out when his car is towed. Ula eyes a young Englishman, who mistakes her for a prostitute, and offers her $50 for sex. The man's hands remind her of Antek's, so she agrees. Back at Joanna's apartment, she and Ula learn about a new trade union, with Derek's fellow dissidents involved. Struggling to cope with Antek's death, Ula meets with a hypnotist, who hypnotizes her so she will forget her husband. However, during the session, Ula sees the ghost of her husband. Back at her apartment, Ula comforts Jacek, who had a dream about the night he caught saw his parents having sex.

Labrador visits Darek in prison and arranges to have members of the union testify in his defense. From Labrador's perspective, the union can defend Darek, stating that he is no threat to the Polish government, and Darek will have his prison sentence reduced. However, Darek vows to remain imprisoned, so he can continue his hunger strike. Labrador sends his apprentice lawyer to advise Darek of his legal options, and convinces Darek to end his hunger strike. Meanwhile, Ula revisits her psychiatrist and attends a candlelight burning at her husband's gravesite. Ula drops Jacek off at her mother-in-law's residence.

When the verdict is read, the judge suspends Darek's jail sentence. After the court adjourns, Labrador announces his retirement. Ula returns to her apartment, turns on the gas oven, and sits in front of it with tape over her mouth. She dies, and is reunited with her husband. Both dressed in black, they walk side by side on a lawn.

== Cast ==
- Grażyna Szapołowska as Urszula Zyro
- Maria Pakulnis as Joanna Stach
- Aleksander Bardini as Lawyer Mieczyslaw Labrador
- Artur Barciś as Darek Stach
- Danny Webb as The Englishman
- Jerzy Radziwilowicz as Antek Zyro
- Michal Bajor as Miecio (aplikant)
- Marek Kondrat as Tomek, Antek's friend
- Tadeusz Bradecki as Hipnotyzator
- Krzysztof Krzeminski as Jacek Zyro
- Marzena Trybała as Marta Duraj
- Adam Ferency as Rumcajs (nom de guerre after Rumcajs)
- Elzbieta Kilarska as Antoni's Mother
- Jerzy Kamas as Judge Biedroń
- Hanna Dunowska as Justyna
- Jan Tesarz as Joanna's Father
- Andrzej Szalawski as Lawyer

== Production ==
The film was Kieślowski's first writing collaboration with the screenwriter Krzysztof Piesiewicz, who co-wrote the screenplays for all of Kieślowski's subsequent films, and the earliest of his films with music by Zbigniew Preisner, who provided the musical score for most of Kieślowski's subsequent films. As in his later scores, Preisner's music is explicitly referenced by the characters in the film itself, in this case with the main character's son playing the theme on a piano at home.

== Reception ==
No End received positive critical reviews. In his review in The A.V. Club, Noel Murray felt that the film deserved to be "counted among his acknowledged classics." Murray gave it an A+ rating.

In an interview, Kieślowski later said of the film:

"…it was terribly received in Poland. I’ve never had such unpleasantness over any other film as I had over this one. It was received terribly by the authorities; it was received terribly by the opposition, and it was received terribly by the Church. Meaning, by the three powers that be in Poland. We really got a thrashing over it. Only one element didn't give us a thrashing, and that was the audience… never in my life have I received as many letters or phone calls about a film from people I didn't know as I did after No End. And all of them, in fact—I didn’t get a single bad letter or call—said that I’d spoken the truth about martial law."

— Krzysztof Kieślowski, in Stok, Danusia (1993). Kieslowski on Kieslowski. London: Faber & Faber. pp. 136–37., quoted in

In his review in Cinemania, Dan Jardine wrote, "No End is Kieslowski’s dry run for Blue, both are wrenching and beautifully-lensed studies of one woman’s struggle to deal with the death of loved ones in a larger politically-charged context. Where they differ: While similarly bleak and sorrowful, Blue finds a tortured peace, a painful hope, where No End is a giant sinkhole of despair."

In his review in the Chicago Reader, Jonathan Rosenbaum called the film "terse, suggestive, and pungent, with juicy performances by Bardini and Szapolowska."

On Rotten Tomatoes, the film has an approval rating of 90% based on 10 reviews.
