= The Fright of Real Tears =

The Fright of Real Tears: Krzysztof Kieślowski Between Theory and Post-Theory
- Author: Slavoj Žižek
- Language: English
- Subject: Krzysztof Kieślowski
- Publisher: British Film Institute
- Publication date: 2001
- Media type: Print
- Pages: 240
- ISBN: 978-0851707549

The Fright of Real Tears: Krzysztof Kieślowski Between Theory and Post-Theory is a 2001 book by the Slovenian philosopher Slavoj Žižek which uses free associative film interpretation to tangentially examine the films of Polish director Krzysztof Kieślowski while avoiding the debate between cognitive film theory and psychoanalytic film theory. It was published by the British Film Institute in 2001.

== Theory versus Post-Theory ==
In the book's introduction, "The Strange Case of the Missing Lacanians", Žižek explicitly positions himself in opposition to the rational and empirical approach to studying cinema which is argued for by David Bordwell and Noël Carroll in their anthology Post-Theory. At the heart of The Fright of Real Tears is the debate between linear reasoned film theorising based on evidence, endorsed by Bordwell and Carroll, and free-associative film interpretation (sometimes referred to simply as "Theory") that references doctrines from psychoanalysis and Marxism endorsed by Žižek. The "missing Lacanians" referred to in the introduction's title are the (according to Žižek, non-existent) Lacanian film theorists Bordwell criticizes for introducing the concept of "the gaze" into film studies. Žižek argues that Bordwell has misunderstood the Lacanian concept of the gaze - a misunderstanding he partly blames on a lamentable (in Žižek's eyes) appropriation of Lacan by cultural studies. Žižek notes that Lacan's concept of the gaze is easily misunderstood as belonging to the subject, whereas Lacan actually believed that the gaze was on the side of the object (TFRT, p. 34).

Žižek contentiously characterizes Post-Theory as a movement in film studies, which Bordwell denies, and argues that it demonstrates intellectual immodesty. Although he notes that those he calls "Post-Theorists" insist on the importance of empirical research in their work, Žižek believes that such a position implicitly exempts the investigating "Post-Theorist" from consideration. For Žižek, this is an illegitimate short-circuit. Citing Bordwell's work on the idea of a trans-cultural universal which directs and guides the spectator's attention, Žižek writes that "the very notion of a trans-cultural universal means different things in different cultures" (p. 17). Žižek's statement is not self-defeating and does not itself imply the existence of trans-cultural universals, he argues, because all cultures do not share the same notion of "universality".

Bordwell has responded in detail to criticisms regarding trans-cultural universals in the book, Figures Traced in Light. Bordwell responds to Žižek's other criticisms in the online essay, "Slavoj Žižek: Say Anything".

== Žižek's Theory of Genre ==
In Chapter One, "Universality and Its Exception", Žižek draws on the linguistics research of Steven Pinker and the metaphysics of G. W. F. Hegel to argue for the structural necessity of what he calls "the exception" to universality. Pinker claims that our linguistic capacity derives from the interaction between two agencies: firstly, our ability to memorize strict rules and, secondly, our ability to then remember some odd exceptions to those rules. The example Žižek cites is the way in which children must learn the exceptions to verb patterns (saying 'bled' instead of 'bleeded', for example) in order to develop linguistic competence. The rule, then, does not function without its exception.

Žižek claims that the structural necessity of the exception also applies to film genre. The issue of genre has always been a problematic one for film theorists (see, for instance, the debate over whether film noir is an aesthetic style or a genre). For Žižek, we locate the highest example of any genre in its exception, which Žižek defines as the work which articulates the conventions of the genre in an unconventional, non-formulaic way. An example here might be Martin Scorsese's film GoodFellas, which is often praised as being the ultimate gangster film, yet is hardly a typical example of the genre.

== Suture and Interface ==
In Chapter Two, "Back To The Suture", Žižek laments the demise of the concept of "suture" in Lacanian film theory, writing that "the time of suture seems to have irrevocably passed: in the present-day cultural studies version of Theory, the term barely occurs; however, rather than accepting this disappearance as a fact, one is tempted to read it as an indication of the decline of cinema studies" (TFRT, p. 31).

Žižek describes the "elementary logic of suture" as consisting of three steps:

- "Firstly, the spectator is confronted with a shot, finds pleasure in it in an immediate, imaginary way, and is absorbed by it" (TFRT, p. 32).
- "Then, this full immersion is undermined by the awareness of the frame as such: what I see is only a part, and I do not master what I see. I am in a passive position, the show is run by the Absent One (or, rather, Other) who manipulates images behind my back" (ibid).
- "What then follows is a complementary shot which renders the place from which the Absent One is looking, allocating this place to its fictional owner, one of the protagonists" (ibid).

The function of suture is to engage the viewer with the narrative events onscreen; the viewer is subjectively sutured into the narrative by the filmmaker(s), in order to keep him or her invested. Žižek then notes that there are some films which intentionally fail to produce the effect of suture; for instance, the films of Jean-Luc Godard pose a challenge to viewers used to more conventional narrative editing. Even the most successful use of suture does not result in the complete immersion of the viewer within the narrative, as Žižek says: "suture is the exact opposite of the illusory, self-enclosed totality that successfully erases the decentred traces of its production process: suture means that, precisely, such self-enclosure is a priori impossible" (p. 58).

Žižek argues that it is not only avant-garde cinema in which suture sometimes fails. He claims that suture hides the fact that what Lacan calls "the big Other" does not exist. In Lacanian psychoanalysis, the big Other is the regulation of the domain of symbolic mandates. For instance, an individual may tell other people that they are a poet, but they are not truly a poet (and certainly not in the eyes of the big Other) until they have their poetry published by a legitimate company (and not, say, a vanity publisher). In his other work, Žižek frequently characterizes the big Other as a symbolic, inter-subjective fiction which we buy into in order for society to function. However, this fictional status of the big Other means that it does not actually exist and is therefore capable of being radically re-articulated (say, for instance, in an act of revolution).

Žižek believes that although all of our thoughts and actions stand in relation to the big Other, we can occasionally glimpse the big Other's fictional status. Whereas suture serves to hide the fictional status of the big Other, avant-garde films in which suture does not function reveal the big Other to be a delicate fiction, vulnerable to violent disintegration. In between these two extremes are art film directors such as Kieślowski, who do not violently get rid of suture (and therefore conventional narrative meaning) in their films but, rather, allow the fictional status of the big Other to shine through in sublime moments. Žižek cites several examples of this technique (which he calls "interface"), two of which can be described here:

- In Orson Welles' 1941 classic Citizen Kane, in the scene in which Kane makes his big political speech, Kane speaks before a giant poster of himself. Žižek compares this to large concert events in which, because the audience is so large, most people watch the performance on giant television screens. Žižek notes that it is wrong to claim that this makes the idea of a live performance a ridiculous one simply because the audience could view the same images in the privacy of their own home. Instead, he claims that what is important is the fact that the performer takes into account the existence of the giant screen and integrates it into their performance. In Citizen Kane, the moment when Kane swallows in close-up during his speech, with the gigantic static image of himself looking serious erected behind him, is a sublime moment. The gap between the small Kane at the lectern and the large, manufactured image of Kane behind him allows the purely fictional nature of the big Other to shine through.
- In Kieślowski's A Short Film About Love, when Magda and Tomek speak to each other through a glass intercom in the local post office, the reflection of the characters' faces in the glass effectively creates the same effect as just described in Citizen Kane.

== The Fictional Nature of Reality and the Art of Kieślowski ==
The "fright of real tears" referred to in the title of Žižek's book originates in Kieślowski's justification for moving from the documentary film form to making fictional feature films instead: "I'm frightened of real tears. In fact, I don't even know whether I've got the right to photograph them. At such times I feel like somebody who's found himself in a realm which is, in fact, out of bounds. That's the main reason why I escaped from documentaries" (Kieślowski, quoted in TFRT, p. 72).

Žižek freely associates between the prohibition on real tears in Kieślowski to the Old Testament ban on images in order to remove degrading over-visibility from ethical significance. In contrast to the popular idea that we can only get to know the real person lurking beneath their adopted social persona once they 'drop the act', Žižek asserts that we can only get to know the truth of an individual's desire when we see them playing a fictional role. The example Žižek uses is that of a computer nerd who, as part of an interactive online game, adopts the persona of a sadistic murderer. It is not the case, claims Žižek, that this choice of persona hides a meek character beneath the fiction but, rather, that "in the guise of a fiction, the truth about [the geek] is articulated" (TFRT, p. 75).

The fictional cinema of Kieślowski is then contrasted with a more general tendency in the European art film to 'show it all'. For instance, there is a growing list of mainstream films which contain scenes of unsimulated sex which, as a consequence, contain hardcore imagery more usually associated with pornographic films. However, Žižek also contrasts Kieślowski's position with the tendency of modern media to produce a discourse in which everything is openly and obscenely declared, such as confessions by public figures like the former U.S. President Bill Clinton. What this trend unintentionally produces, claims Žižek, is a situation in which discourse becomes impotent and words no longer have any power or effect. For a Marxist such as Žižek, this has important implications for political power struggles.

Žižek therefore celebrates Kieślowski as a great artist for maintaining an aesthetic approach which insists on the fictional nature of truth and reality.
