= Workers '71: Nothing About Us Without Us =

Polish 70's Documentary

Workers '71: Nothing About Us Without Us (Polish: Robotnicy '71: Nic o nas bez nas) is a 1972 TV documentary co-directed by Krzysztof Kieślowski, Tomasz Zygadło, Wojciech Wiszniewski, Paweł Kędzierski, and Tadeusz Walendowski. It was an attempt to portray the state of mind of the working class after the 1970 mass strikes in Poland by showing Gdansk Shipyard workers on the factory floor and their relationship with management. Kieślowski considered it his most political film.

The film is organized into segments: "Morning", "The Division of Labor", "Mass Gathering", "Hands", "Heads", etc. It presents miners, steelworkers, and textile workers expressing their concerns about salaries, quotas, and abuses of the system to their union representatives, and follows an industrial congress electing delegates to a future convention of the Polish United Workers' Party. It uses observational documentary techniques, and forgoes narration besides the segment titles. With that approach they managed to show an activist falsifying scores after the elections for Workers’ Council as well as the workers revolting against electoral deception.

The film was produced by the WFD. The production was originally ordered by officials in the new Edward Gierek political administration to demonstrate ”workers’ concern for the future of the country” and ”public support for the party’s activity.” In the end it was heavily censored because of the openly critical political language of the workers and only shown on TV in an ideologically proper re-edit under an alternative title "Gospodarze" without credits, against the will of the filmmakers. Two reels of unused and especially risky audio were confiscated by the police while the film was being edited and Kieślowski was accused of trying to smuggle them out of Poland to sell to Radio Free Europe. Kieślowski credits the censorship of the film and the ordeal of the edit as the reason he switched to fiction filmmaking.

The title was later referenced for the documentary Workers '80 by Andrzej Chodakowski and Andrzej Zajączkowski about workers organizing in the Gdansk Shipyard Strike.
