= Valley of Shadows (2017 film) =

- Norwegian: Skyggenes dal
- Directed by: Jonas Matzow Gulbrandsen
- Screenplay by: Jonas Matzow Gulbrandsen; Clement Tuffreau
- Produced by: Alan R. Milligan
- Starring: Adam Ekeli; Katherine Fagerland; John Olav Nilsen; Lennard Salamon
- Cinematography: Marius Matzow Gulbrandsen
- Edited by: Mariusz Kus
- Music by: Zbigniew Preisner
- Release date: September 2017 (TIFF)
- Country: Norway
- Language: Norwegian

Valley of Shadows (Norwegian: Skyggenes dal) is a 2017 Norwegian mystery drama film directed by Jonas Matzow Gulbrandsen and lensed by Marius Matzow Gulbrandsen. The music from Zbigniew Preisner has been nominated to the World soundtrack Public Choice Awards.

== Plot ==
Aslak is a young boy living with his mother, Astrid, in a hilly sheep farming country adjacent to forested national parkland.

Aslak and his older friend Lasse venture into a farm building and discover the grisly remains of several sheep. From a hidden spot, they overhear Lasse’s father say to another man that "he is killing just for fun" will hunt the killer to death and claim it was a dog attack. Lasse plants the notion in Aslak’s mind that the killer is a werewolf.

That evening, Astrid receives a visit from police seeking her eldest son, a destructive addict who had been ejected from the family home many months before. He is now a person of interest concerning violent crimes committed. Panicked, she leaves on an unexplained errand; Aslak, alone in the house all evening, seeks comfort with Rapp, his beloved dog.

Lasse and Aslak find more eviscerated sheep carcasses in the fields. Later, conflating the matter of the missing brother with that of the savaged sheep, Aslak muses that his brother may be the werewolf. He enters his missing brother’s room. Astrid, who has kept the room as it was before the lost son left, finds him there and reprimands him for intruding. Stung, Aslak asks permission to spend the night at Lasse’s home. Astrid reluctantly agrees, although concerned about the difference in their ages.

After lights out, the boys discuss older brothers and the possible location of the "monster that kills for fun". Lasse expresses his belief that it lives in the nearby forest. In the morning, they go there; Lasse lifts Aslak over the fence and into the woods. After a brief foray, Aslak is spooked by the sight of a long-dead sheep and flees back to the open field.

Lasse's father has brought sheep into an outbuilding for their protection for the night. Lasse shows Aslak bundles of poisoned meat in the barn: bait to be distributed in the forest. The three watch as the bonfire consumes the bodies of the sheep.

Back home, at breakfast, Aslak watches as the police pull in once again, and his mother goes outside to meet them. As children’s radio programming plays in the background, Aslak sees his mother collapse and runs to hide. From his position, he hears Astrid scream in anguish.

At the police station, Aslak draws a picture, watched over by a policewoman. Bloody images of dead sheep hang on the wall of an adjacent office, visible through the door frame close by. Astrid laments her decision to evict her elder son and blames the police for failing to prevent his crime spree and death: "Just another dead junkie. But he was my son!"

Aslak again explores his brother's room, appropriating a kerosene lighter. Then, accompanied by Rapp, he explores a derelict caravan. Rapp, alarmed by something in the forest, runs off in pursuit. Aslak races after him but is unable to catch up. He returns home without Rapp.

Astrid assures Aslak that if Rapp has not returned by morning, she will help search for him. However, Rapp has still not returned in the morning, and Astrid is unrousable; Aslak sets off to explore with a small backpack and a jam sandwich. In the forest, Aslak encounters more sheep remains but forges onward. Through the hours, there is fog, rain, a moose from which Aslak flees and, falling, injures his leg. As night falls, Aslak is completely lost. Screaming foxes make fearsome sounds in the darkness as Aslak crouches under the bole of a tree against an embankment down which rills run. Rain falls, and Aslak is exhausted and afflicted with exposure. The sandwich falls from his hand, rinsed by the rain as he sinks into unconsciousness.

In the cold, damp morning, weak and exhausted by hunger, Aslak continues to search for Rapp. He sees a strange sight and hears a creaking, cracking sound of inexplicably moving branches. Traversing a rise, Aslak sees a large tree moving weightily downstream, catching on and damaging trees growing on the banks.

He finds a rowboat. Aslak climbs in and is carried downstream through increasingly uncanny environs with scudding mists and gloom. The boat fetches up against a bank. Aslak sees a dark, motionless hooded figure watching his arrival through trees across an inlet. He wearily approaches a derelict, unlit house.

The resident appears as a mythical being through Aslak's delirium of exposure and exhaustion, seemingly winking in and out of existence. Aslak enquires whether he is the monster. Not directly denying this, the man ruminates that what men do not understand, they fear. He offers comfort while Aslak sleeps again. The man carries Aslak back to the boat, lays him in it, and pushes it from the bank to drift away.

The boat finds the bank once more. Hearing barking, Aslak runs, calling Rapp. He is found by a Red Cross search party with dogs and taken to his mother.

Home again, refreshed by sleep, Astrid fondly greets Aslak. Lasse arrives with Rapp, found in a barn. Aslak and Rapp play together in the field, but Aslak continues to worry about the forest and the monster.

Later, Aslak watches as Lasse’s father repairs the hole in the fence leading into the forest and as the poisoned bait is distributed. Aslak, no longer afraid of the woods or the monster— possibly his brother, a werewolf— returns under cover of darkness to gather up the poisoned bait and reopen the fence.

At full moon, a wolf howls in the night.

Aslak and Astrid dress for the elder son's funeral in the morning. Astrid regrets that there had been no time for Aslak to get to know his brother.

The final shot shows Aslak, still dressed in black, motionless on his brother’s bed.

== See also ==
- List of Norwegian films of the 2010s
