= Three Colours trilogy =

1993 French psychological drama films

Three Colours
- French: Trois Couleurs
- Directed by: Krzysztof Kieślowski
- Written by: Krzysztof Kieślowski; Krzysztof Piesiewicz
- Produced by: Marin Karmitz
- Starring: Juliette Binoche; Benoît Régent (Blue); Zbigniew Zamachowski; Julie Delpy (White); Irène Jacob; Jean-Louis Trintignant (Red)
- Cinematography: Slawomir Idziak (Blue); Edward Kłosiński (White); Piotr Sobociński (Red)
- Edited by: Jacques Witta
- Music by: Zbigniew Preisner
- Production companies: mk2 Productions SA; France 3 Cinema; CAB Productions; TOR Production; Canal+
- Distributed by: mk2 Diffusion (France); Rialto Film (Switzerland)
- Release dates: 8 September 1993 (Blue); 26 January 1994 (White); 14 September 1994 (Red)
- Running time: 288 minutes; 94 minutes (Blue); 88 minutes (White); 99 minutes (Red)
- Countries: France; Poland; Switzerland
- Languages: French; Polish (White)
- Box office: $6.1 million

The Three Colours trilogy (French: Trois couleurs, Polish: Trzy kolory) is the collective title of three psychological drama films directed by Krzysztof Kieślowski, co-written by Kieślowski and Krzysztof Piesiewicz (with story consultants Agnieszka Holland and Sławomir Idziak), produced by Marin Karmitz and composed by Zbigniew Preisner. The trilogy consists of Three Colours: Blue (1993), Three Colours: White (1994), and Three Colours: Red (1994). The trilogy, while not sharing a specific storyline, thematically examines the French Revolutionary ideals, and is interconnected, particularly in Red, with cameo appearances of characters from Blue and White.

Represented by the Flag of France, the trilogy is an international co-production between France, Poland, and Switzerland in the French language, with the exception of White in Polish and French. All three films garnered widespread acclaim from reviews, with Red receiving nominations for Best Director, Best Original Screenplay, and Best Cinematography at the 67th Academy Awards.

== Themes ==
Blue, white, and red are the colours of the French flag in hoist-to-fly order, and the story of each film is loosely based on one of the three political ideals in the motto of the French Republic: liberty, equality, fraternity. As with the treatment of the Ten Commandments in Dekalog, the illustration of these principles is often ambiguous and ironic. As Kieślowski noted in an interview with an Oxford University student newspaper: "The words [liberté, egalité, fraternité] are French because the money [to fund the films] is French. If the money had been of a different nationality, we would have titled the films differently, or they might have had a different cultural connotation. But the films would probably have been the same".

The trilogy has also been interpreted by film critic Roger Ebert as, respectively, an anti-tragedy, an anti-comedy, and an anti-romance.

== Connections and patterns ==
A symbol common to the three films is that of an underlying link or thing that keeps the protagonist linked to their past. In the case of Blue, it is the lamp of blue beads, and a symbol seen throughout the film in the TV of people falling (doing either sky diving or bungee jumping); the director is careful to show falls with no cords at the beginning of the film, but as the story develops the image of cords becomes more and more apparent as a symbol of a link to the past. In the case of White the item that links Karol to his past is a 2 Fr. coin and a plaster bust of Marianne that he steals from an antique store in Paris. In the case of Red, the judge never closes or locks his doors and his fountain pen, which stops working at a crucial point in the story.

Another recurring image related to the spirit of the film is that of elderly people recycling bottles: In Blue, an old woman in Paris is recycling bottles and Julie does not notice her (in the spirit of liberty); in White, an old man also in Paris is trying to recycle a bottle but cannot reach the container and Karol looks at him with a sinister grin on his face (in the spirit of equality); and in Red, an old woman cannot reach the hole of the container and Valentine helps her (in the spirit of fraternity).

In Blue, while Julie is searching for her husband's mistress in the central courthouse, she accidentally steps into an active court trial and is immediately turned around by security. While Julie is peeking into the courtroom, Karol from White can be heard pleading to the judge in a scene that begins his chapter of the trilogy.

Each film's ending shot is of a character crying. In Blue, Julie de Courcy cries looking into space. In White, Karol cries as he looks at his wife. In Red, the judge Kern cries as he looks through his broken window out at the camera.

Many main characters from Blue and White, including Julie and Karol, appear at the ending of Red as survivors of a ferry accident.

== Principal cast ==
Three Colours: Blue

- Juliette Binoche - Julie
- Benoît Régent - Olivier
- Florence Pernel - Sandrine

Three Colours: White

- Zbigniew Zamachowski - Karol
- Julie Delpy - Dominique
- Janusz Gajos - Mikolaj

Three Colours: Red

- Irène Jacob - Valentine
- Jean-Louis Trintignant - Joseph
- Jean-Pierre Lorit - Auguste

== Soundtrack ==
Three Colors (soundtracks)

Soundtrack album by Zbigniew Preisner
- Released: 1993 - 1994
- Genres: Soundtrack, Classical
- Length: 40:35; 35:46; 41:57
- Labels: Virgin; Capitol Records

Music for all three parts of the trilogy was composed by Zbigniew Preisner and performed by Silesian Philharmonic choir along with Sinfonia Varsovia.

== Reception ==
Film	Rotten Tomatoes	Metacritic
Blue	96% (56 reviews)	87 (11 reviews)
White	91% (54 reviews)	91 (11 reviews)
Red	100% (60 reviews)	100 (11 reviews)

The trilogy as a whole topped The San Diego Union-Tribune's list of the best films of 1994, ranked third on San Jose Mercury News writer Glenn Lovell's year-end list, ten on a list by Michael Mills of The Palm Beach Post, and was also on unranked top-tens list by Tulsa World's Dennis King and The Atlanta Journal-Constitution critics Eleanor Ringel and Steve Murray. Roger Ebert ranked the trilogy as a whole at No. 5 on his list of the "Best films of 1990s" and included it in his "Great Movies" list. Empire magazine ranked it #11 and #14 on their "The 33 Greatest Movie Trilogies" and "The 100 Best Films of World Cinema" lists respectively.
