= Three Colours: White =

1994 French film by Krzysztof Kieślowski

- Theatrical release poster
- Directed by: Krzysztof Kieślowski
- Written by: Krzysztof Kieślowski; Krzysztof Piesiewicz
- Produced by: Marin Karmitz
- Starring: Zbigniew Zamachowski; Julie Delpy; Janusz Gajos; Jerzy Stuhr
- Cinematography: Edward Kłosiński
- Edited by: Urszula Lesiak
- Music by: Zbigniew Preisner
- Production companies: mk2 Productions SA; France 3 Cinéma; CAB Productions SA; TOR Production; Canal+
- Distributed by: mk2 Diffusion (France); Rialto Film (Switzerland)
- Release dates: 26 January 1994 (France); 4 February 1994 (Switzerland); 25 February 1994 (Warsaw)
- Running time: 92 minutes
- Countries: France; Poland; Switzerland
- Languages: Polish; French
- Box office: $1.4 million

Three Colours: White (French: Trois couleurs: Blanc, Polish: Trzy kolory: Biały) is a 1994 arthouse psychological comedy-drama film co-written, produced and directed by Krzysztof Kieślowski. White is the second in the Three Colours trilogy, themed on the French Revolutionary ideals, following Blue and preceding Red. The film, like its precedent and succedent, received widespread critical acclaim and was selected as the Polish entry for the Best Foreign Language Film at the 67th Academy Awards.

White is about equality, with the film depicting Karol Karol, a shy man who, after being left by his wife in humiliating circumstances in Paris, loses his money, his residency, and his friends. As a deeply ashamed beggar in Paris, Karol begins his effort to restore equality to his life through revenge.

== Plot ==
At a Paris divorce court, Polish barber Karol Karol is pleading with the judge. (Note: The same court hearing that Julie briefly stumbled upon in Blue while looking to meet the mistress of her late husband.) Karol, through an interpreter, is made to understand that his wife Dominique does not love him as he was unable to consummate the marriage. The divorce is granted, and Dominique hands Karol a suitcase with his possessions before driving off. Karol loses access to his bank account, his passport, and ownership of a salon he and Dominique owned jointly. Karol breaks into the salon to sleep, but is discovered by Dominique the next morning. The two initiate sex, but he again suffers impotence. Dominique declares that she no longer loves him. She then sets the salon drapes on fire and frames him for arson, forcing Karol to flee and become a beggar.

While performing songs using a comb in a Paris Métro station, Karol meets fellow Pole Mikołaj. While Karol has lost his wife and his property, Mikołaj is married and successful; he offers Karol a job—he must kill someone who wants to die but does not have enough courage to do it himself. Karol declines and proceeds to show Dominique to Mikołaj from outside her window, but he sees the shadow of her with another man. Karol runs and calls her from a telephone booth at the station, only for Dominique to make him listen to her having sex, causing him to break down. Mikołaj helps Karol return to Poland hidden in the suitcase, which is later stolen by employees at the airport. After discovering how poor he is, the airport employees beat him up and leave him in a Polish countryside dump. Karol reaches Warsaw and finds his brother Jurek.

Karol soon returns to work at Jurek's hair salon and later takes on another job as a bodyguard in a cash exchange office. Using his position as a bodyguard, Karol spies on his bosses and discovers their scheme to purchase pieces of land that they know will be targeted by major companies for development and resell for large profits. Karol beats them to it and informs his former bosses that if they kill him, all his estate will go to the church, forcing them to purchase the land from him instead. Karol then tracks down Mikołaj and asks for the job he offered to him previously. Mikołaj meets Karol in a Warsaw Metro tunnel for the execution of the "suicide". Mikołaj turns out to be the intended victim and asks Karol to kill him. Karol first shoots a blank into Mikołaj's chest and asks if he really wants to go through with it, as the next bullet is real. Mikołaj changes his mind and thanks Karol for helping him feel alive again. He pays Karol the money anyway, saying that he earned it.

Karol later goes into business with Mikołaj. Karol becomes ambitious, earning a fortune while improving his French and brooding over Dominique's abandonment. One night, after waking up from a dream about Dominique, Karol calls her, but she hangs up. He devises a scheme to exact revenge on her. He gives Dominique the majority of his fortune in his will, then, with the help of Mikołaj and Jurek as well as his financial influences, fakes his own death and prepares to frame her for it. He arranges to move to Hong Kong afterwards. On the day of his "burial", Karol sees Dominique mourning from afar. He later surprises her in her hotel room, apparently reconciling with her before they have sex, this time successfully. In the morning, Karol leaves before Dominique wakes up. She is then awakened by the local police, who arrest her on the suspicion that she murdered Karol to obtain his money.

Karol later visits a prison complex and sees Dominique through her cell window with binoculars. She uses sign language to tell Karol that she wants to marry him again after her release from prison, which brings him to tears.

== Cast ==
- Zbigniew Zamachowski as Karol Karol
- Julie Delpy as Dominique Vidal
- Janusz Gajos as Mikołaj
- Jerzy Stuhr as Jurek
- Aleksander Bardini as the lawyer
- Grzegorz Warchoł as the elegant man
- Cezary Harasimowicz as the inspector
- Jerzy Nowak as the old farmer
- Jerzy Trela as Monsieur Bronek
- Teresa Budzisz-Krzyżanowska as Madame Jadwiga
- Juliette Binoche as Julie de Courcy (cameo)

== Production ==
The final scene of Dominique standing behind bars of her prison cell was shot months after the rest of the film, and was intended to soften Dominique's image; Kieślowski has said that he was dissatisfied with the ending shot previously and wanted her to seem less of a monster. Filming lasted from 9 November 1992 to 1 February 1993.

== Analysis ==
The film has been interpreted as an anti-comedy by Roger Ebert, in parallel with Blue being an anti-tragedy and Red being an anti-romance.

== Reception ==
Three Colours: White was met with critical acclaim; it holds an 91% rating on Rotten Tomatoes, with an average rating of 7.8/10, based on 54 reviews. The consensus reads: "Taking a lighter tone than the other films of the Three Colours trilogy, White is a witty, bittersweet comedy with heavier themes on its mind than one might at first realise". On Metacritic, it was assigned a score of 91 out of 100, based on 11 critic reviews, indicating "universal acclaim".

== Year-end lists ==
- 4th – Todd Anthony, Miami New Times
- 5th – Desson Howe, The Washington Post
- Honorable mention – Jeff Simon, The Buffalo News

== Awards and recognition ==
Award / Film Festival	Category	Recipient(s)	Result	Ref
Berlin International Film Festival	Golden Bear	Three Colours: White	Nominated	
Berlin International Film Festival	Silver Bear for Best Director	Krzysztof Kieślowski	Won	
Chicago Film Critics Association	Best Foreign Language Film	Three Colours: White	Nominated	
European Film Awards	Best Film	Three Colours: White (also for Three Colours: Blue and Three Colours: Red)	Nominated	
Turkish Film Critics Association	Best Foreign Film	Three Colours: White	9th place	

== See also ==
- List of submissions to the 67th Academy Awards for Best Foreign Language Film
- List of Polish submissions for the Academy Award for Best Foreign Language Film
