= Florence Pernel =

French actress (born 1962)

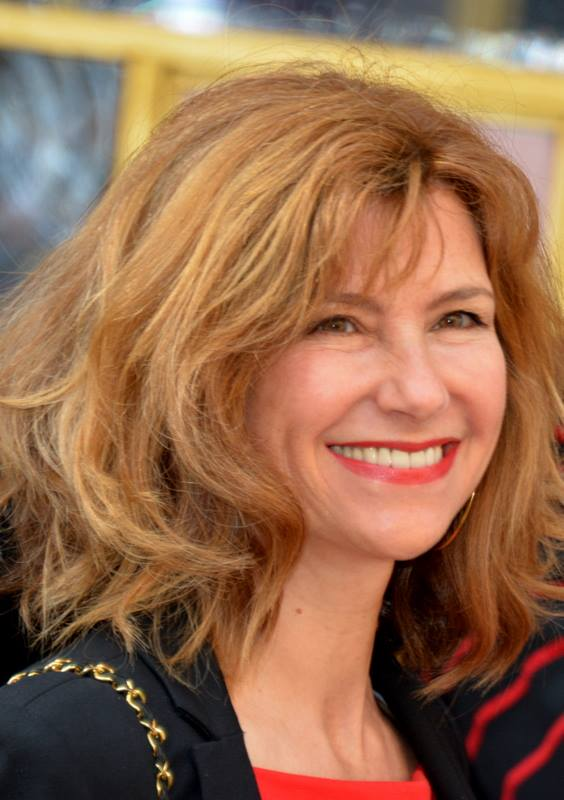
- Pernel in 2014
- Born: 30 May 1962 (age 64); Paris, France
- Occupations: Actress, film director, screenwriter
- Spouse: Patrick Rotman

Florence Pernel (born 30 May 1962) is a French actress.

== Early life ==
Pernel was born on 30 May 1962 in Paris.

She began her acting career at the age of 10 with the TV serial Plein soleil and two years later she made her film debut with Just Jaeckin-directed Girls. She was nominated for César Award in the category Most Promising Actress for her performance in Que les gros salaires lèvent le doigt !, directed by Denys Granier-Deferre. At age 16 she visited a theater class from Didier Betourne that allowed her a scholarship from the Foundation of Marcel Bleu-Blanchet. From 1991 to 1992 she studied at Studio Pygmalion with Professor Pascal Luneau and from 1993 to 1997, she again took acting classes at Didier Betourne.

== Career ==
=== Film ===
Pernel had her breakthrough as an adult when she played the character of Sandrine in the 1993 drama film Three Colors: Blue (French: Trois couleurs:bleu) directed by Krzysztof Kieslowski. She acted alongside Juliette Binoche and Benoît Régent in the film, and her role earned her a César award nomination in the "Best female debut" category.

In 2000 she played the role of Helene-Anne in the Spanish-language political drama Yoyes directed by Helena Taberna. Pernel played the role of Nicolas Sarkozy's second wife, Cécilia, in the 2011 biopic The Conquest, directed by Xavier Durringer. Her co-stars were Denis Podalydès, who played Sarkozy, and Bernard Le Coq. The film was screened at the 2011 Cannes Film Festival.

=== TV ===
Pernel has also acted in several TV movies. In 2009 she played the lead role of Caroline Delaume in the six-part French television series Mes amis, mes amours, mes emmerdes.

== Personal life ==
Pernel is married to historian Patrick Rotman. The couple has two children.
