= Curriculum Vitae (film) =

1975 Polish film

- Directed by: Krzysztof Kieślowski
- Written by: Janusz Fastyn; Krzysztof Kieslowski
- Cinematography: Jacek Petrycki; Tadeusz Rusinek
- Edited by: Lidia Zonn
- Release date: 1975
- Running time: 45 minutes
- Country: Poland
- Language: Polish

Curriculum Vitae (Polish: Życiorys) is a 1975 Polish film written and directed by Krzysztof Kieślowski.

== Plot ==
A communist party control committee interrogates a worker and party activist who is to be excluded from the party.
