= Three Colours: Red =

1994 film by Krzysztof Kieślowski

- Theatrical release poster
- French: Trois couleurs: Rouge
- Directed by: Krzysztof Kieślowski
- Written by: Krzysztof Piesiewicz; Krzysztof Kieślowski
- Produced by: Marin Karmitz
- Starring: Irène Jacob; Jean-Louis Trintignant; Jean-Pierre Lorit; Frédérique Feder
- Cinematography: Piotr Sobociński
- Edited by: Jacques Witta
- Music by: Zbigniew Preisner
- Production companies: mk2 Productions SA; France 3 Cinéma; CAB Productions SA; TOR Production; Canal+; Télévision Suisse Romande
- Distributed by: mk2 Diffusion (France); Rialto Film (Switzerland)
- Release dates: 12 May 1994 (Cannes); 27 May 1994 (Poland); 31 August 1994 (Switzerland); 14 September 1994 (France)
- Running time: 99 minutes
- Countries: France; Poland; Switzerland
- Language: French
- Box office: $4 million

Three Colours: Red (French: Trois couleurs: Rouge, Polish: Trzy kolory: Czerwony) is a 1994 romantic psychological drama mystery art film co-written, produced and directed by Polish filmmaker Krzysztof Kieślowski. It is the final installment of the Three Colours trilogy, which examines the French Revolutionary ideals; it is preceded by Blue and then by White.

Kieślowski had announced that this would be his final film, planning to retire claiming to be through with filmmaking; he would die suddenly less than two years later. Red is about fraternity, which it examines by showing characters whose lives gradually become closely interconnected, with bonds forming between two characters who appear to have little in common.

Red was released to universal critical acclaim and was nominated for three Academy Awards, including Best Director for Kieślowski. It was also selected as the Swiss entry for the Best Foreign Language Film at the 67th Academy Awards, but was disqualified for not being a majority-Swiss production; its precedent however, submitted by Poland, was accepted although it did not secure a nomination. Since then it has been widely regarded as one of the best films of all time, as well as one of the greatest French-language films ever made.

== Plot ==
Valentine Dussaut is a student at the University of Geneva who works part-time as a model. She often contacts her possessive boyfriend Michel, who is currently in England. During a photo shoot for a chewing gum advertising campaign, the photographer instructs Valentine to look sad as she poses against a red background.

While walking home one night, Auguste Bruner, Valentine's neighbour and a law student, drops his textbooks, one falling open to a particular chapter of the Criminal Code. While driving home that same night, Valentine accidentally runs over Rita, a pregnant Malinois dog. She tracks down the dog's owner, a reclusive retired judge named Joseph Kern. When he shows no concern, Valentine takes Rita to a veterinarian and decides to keep her. She selects her favourite photo at the studio, rebuffing the photographer's sexual advances. Valentine later receives a sum of money from an anonymous sender at her apartment.

The next day, when Valentine takes Rita for a walk, the dog runs off and leads her back to Joseph's house. Joseph confirms that he sent the money for the veterinary expenses and tells Valentine to keep the dog. Inside his house, she catches him eavesdropping on a male neighbour's phone conversation with his male lover. She urges Joseph to respect his neighbour's privacy; he challenges her to reveal the eavesdropping to the neighbour. Valentine goes next door to do so, but leaves without denouncing Joseph after discovering the neighbor leads a straight life with a wife and seeing that the neighbour's daughter is listening on the phone extension.

Joseph tells Valentine that their actions will not affect the outcome of these people's lives. This reminds Valentine of her teenage brother, who discovered that he is not his father's biological son. Joseph plays Valentine a phone conversation between Auguste and his girlfriend Karin. From his window, Joseph and Valentine observe another male neighbour, whom Joseph suspects is a heroin dealer, which upsets Valentine. When Joseph correctly deduces that Valentine's brother is a heroin addict, she declares that she pities Joseph and leaves.

That night, Joseph writes letters to his neighbours and the police confessing his spying activities, resulting in a class-action lawsuit. Meanwhile, Auguste passes his exam to become a judge, crediting his success to the dropped textbook. Auguste's first case as a judge is Joseph's trial. At court, Joseph sees Karin meeting another man. Joseph later reveals to Valentine that he turned himself in to see if she would come back. Valentine discusses her upcoming trip to England to visit Michel; Joseph suggests that she take the ferry. Joseph recounts a case where he wrongly acquitted a sailor. When Valentine asks about Joseph's love life, he evades the question and discusses a recent dream in which Valentine was happy.

Unable to reach Karin by phone, Auguste climbs up to her flat and catches her having sex with another man. He takes his anger out on his dog by leaving it tied to a lamppost. Joseph calls Karin's personalised weather service to inquire about the weather for the English Channel next week, which she predicts will be clear. Karin plans to sail there soon with her new boyfriend, who owns a yacht.

The day before Valentine leaves for England, she invites Joseph to her fashion show. Afterwards, Joseph elaborates on his dream with Valentine, in which she was 50 years old and happy with an unidentified man. He then recounts events earlier in his life that parallel those in Auguste's (a dropped law book falling open at a critical passage and finding his lover having sex with another man) and that the woman he loved died in an accident after he followed her across the English Channel. His last case as a judge involved his ex-girlfriend's lover. Before parting ways, Joseph and Valentine plan to meet again in three weeks, when he will give her one of Rita's puppies.

Valentine boards the ferry to England. Auguste also boards the ferry, reunited with his dog. The next morning, Joseph learns that a storm has hit the English Channel, causing both the ferry and the yacht with Karin and her boyfriend to sink. Watching the television coverage of the incident, it is revealed that only seven survivors were rescued: a barman, Julie and Olivier (from Blue), Karol and Dominique (from White), Auguste (without his dog), and Valentine. Upon seeing the news, Joseph is relieved. The freeze frame of Valentine's face on the news coverage mirrors that of the chewing gum photograph.

== Cast ==
- Irène Jacob as Valentine Dussaut
- Jean-Louis Trintignant as Joseph Kern
- Frédérique Feder as Karin
- Jean-Pierre Lorit as Auguste Bruner
- Samuel Le Bihan as the photographer
- Marion Stalens as the veterinarian
- Teco Celio as the barman
- Bernard Escalon as the record dealer
- Jean Schlegel as the neighbour
- Roland Carey as the drug dealer
- Marc Autheman as Michel (voice)
- Juliette Binoche as Julie Vignon
- Julie Delpy as Dominique Vidal
- Benoît Régent as Olivier Benôit
- Zbigniew Zamachowski as Karol Karol

== Production ==
Kieslowski said that Red was the most difficult film of the trilogy to write: "I've got everything I need to put across what I want to say, which is really quite complicated. Therefore, if the idea I've got in mind doesn't come across, it meant that either film is too primitive a medium to support such a construction or that all of us put together haven't got enough talent for it." The main theme of the score, "Bolero", was written before any filming took place. According to the filmmakers, it was meant to symbolize events that occur repeatedly in people's lives. Principal photography took place from 1 March 1993 to 29 April 1993.

== Symbolism ==
Colors: As in the previous two films, a single color dominates: numerous objects in the film are bright red, including the advertising banner featuring Valentine's facial profile and the cherries on the slot machine and her yogurt cup. Red is associated with several human emotions.

Levels: Characters are often juxtaposed on different physical levels. The scenes between Valentine and Joseph at his house never show the characters on the same level: Valentine either stands above him or sits below him. When Karin searches for Auguste, he hides on a walkway below her. During the climactic scene in the theater, Valentine stands on the stage, towering over Joseph who is in the pit below.

Communication: Telephone communication is important throughout. Valentine and Michel speak only via phone and often miss each other's calls. Auguste and Karin frequently call each other. The judge calls Karin for weather information. When Joseph reveals his eavesdropping, his neighbors throw rocks through his windows, and at the end of the film Joseph watches Valentine and Auguste on the news while watching the outside world through broken glass. Also, when Valentine is bowling, the camera moves down the line to where there sits a broken glass next to a packet of Marlboro Red cigarettes, which is the brand that Auguste smokes.

Voyeurism: Joseph eavesdrops on his neighbours phone calls. Auguste climbs Karin's apartment building and looks on as she has sex with another man. Valentine sees a picture of her brother injecting heroin in the newspaper, echoing similar scenes from early '90s Switzerland such as Platzspitz (or Needle Park as it was then known) in Zurich.

The recycling bin: A recurring scene of an elderly person trying to put a bottle in a recycling bin appears in all three films, but with different outcomes. In Blue, Julie does not see her. In White, Karol ignores her. In Red, Valentine finally pushes the bottle into the bin. This action has been described as 'act of kindness that is the climax of the entire trilogy and the gesture that saves the world.

The number seven: Referenced throughout the trilogy - Rita has seven puppies, there are seven survivors of the ferry disaster, there are seven baby mice in Blue.

Biblical and religious references: Biblical references relating to the Gospel of Matthew are also evident. The old man can be pictured as an Old Testament archetype, a God-like figure. Exploring biblical ideas in Red, the question of the judge being a 'God' figure is probably the one that has been explored most often. This view sees him like an Old Testament God, having control over the wind and seas and predicting people's future. This film also depicts topics of the Philosophy of Law and the manner in which man acts in society, the relationship between the law, ethics and socially acceptable behavior and how not all of them coincide, particularly in the reflections by Judge Kern and some symbols related to Auguste.

Valentines name takes after St. Valentine, closely associated with love. Joseph drinks pear brandy in the film, referencing St. Augustine's theft of pears, and further linking him to the character of Auguste.

Miscellaneous connections: Joseph and Auguste both abandon their dogs. Rita is eventually returned to Joseph by Valentine, Auguste's dog is last seen boarding the ferry with Auguste and presumed missing in the ferry accident. This draws another parallel between the two, suggesting that Auguste has begun to harden and become bitter like the older Joseph.

== Reception ==
=== Critical response ===
At the time of Red's release, film critic Geoff Andrew responded positively in Time Out London: "While Kieślowski dips into various interconnecting lives, the central drama is the electrifying encounter between Valentine—caring, troubled—and the judge, whose tendency to play God fails to match, initially, the girl's compassion. It's a film about destiny and chance, solitude and communication, cynicism and faith, doubt and desire; about lives affected by forces beyond rationalization. The assured direction avoids woolly mysticism by using material resources—actors, color, movement, composition, sound—to illuminate abstract concepts. Stunningly beautiful, powerfully scored and immaculately performed, the film is virtually flawless, and one of the very greatest cinematic achievements of the last few decades. A masterpiece".

Film critic James Berardinelli of Reelviews also lauded the film, giving it four out of four stars. He described it as a "subtle" masterpiece, also praising the film's "satisfying exploration of such complex and diverse themes as destiny and platonic love". The film went on to become his 18th greatest film of all time. The trade magazine Variety was also enthusiastic about the film, highlighting the lead performances from Jacob and Trintignant. The British Film magazine Empire described the film as a "superb example of French arthouse which is also very watchable".

The film was included in the San Francisco Chronicle's "Hot 100 Films from the Past" in 1997. It holds a 100% approval rating on Rotten Tomatoes, based on 60 reviews, with an average rating of 9.1/10. Rotten Tomatoes' critical consensus reads: "A complex, stirring, and beautifully realized portrait of interconnected lives, Red is the captivating conclusion to a remarkable trilogy". On Metacritic, it was assigned a score of 100 out of 100, based on 11 critic reviews, meaning "universal acclaim".

Roger Ebert interpreted the film as an anti-romance, in parallel with Blue being an anti-tragedy and White being an anti-comedy.

=== Year-end lists ===
- 1st – Desson Howe, The Washington Post
- 1st – Kevin Thomas, Los Angeles Times
- 2nd - Roger Ebert, Chicago Sun-Times Ebert included the entire Three Colors Trilogy in his list; later, when he wrote about it a separate essay for "Great Movies" section, he noted that Red is "the best film among equals".
- 2nd – Kenneth Turan, Los Angeles Times
- 4th – James Berardinelli, ReelViews
- 8th – Janet Maslin, The New York Times
- 8th – Robert Denerstein, Rocky Mountain News
- 9th – Scott Schuldt, The Oklahoman
- Top 10 (listed alphabetically, not ranked) – Matt Zoller Seitz, Dallas Observer
- Top 10 (not ranked) – Howie Movshovitz, The Denver Post

=== Awards and recognition ===
- Nominated for three Academy Awards:
  - Best Director – Krzysztof Kieślowski
  - Best Original Screenplay – Krzysztof Kieślowski and Krzysztof Piesiewicz
  - Best Cinematography – Piotr Sobociński
- 1996 BAFTA Awards:
  - Best Director - Krzysztof Kieślowski (Nominated)
  - Best Original Screenplay - Krzysztof Kieślowski and Krzysztof Piesiewicz (Nominated)
  - Best Film Not in English Language - Martin Karmitz and Krzysztof Kieślowski (Nominated)
- Cannes Film Festival, Palme d'Or (nominated)
- National Board of Review, Best Foreign Language Film
- New York Film Critics Circle Awards, Best Foreign Language Film
- Bodil Awards, Best European Film
- National Society of Film Critics Awards, Best Foreign Language Film
- Los Angeles Film Critics Association Awards, Best Foreign Film
- French Syndicate of Cinema Critics Awards, Best French Film
- Zbigniew Preisner won the César Award for Best Music
- César Award nominations:
  - Best Film
  - Best Actor – Jean-Louis Trintignant
  - Best Actress – Irène Jacob
  - Best Director – Krzysztof Kieślowski
  - Best Original Screenplay or Adaptation – Krzysztof Kieślowski and Krzysztof Piesiewicz
- Red was selected by The New York Times as one of "The Best 1,000 Movies Ever Made".
- In 2007, the film was ranked at No. 33 by The Guardian's readers poll on the list of "40 greatest foreign films of all time".

== See also ==
- List of films with a 100% rating on Rotten Tomatoes, a film review aggregator website
- List of submissions to the 67th Academy Awards for Best Foreign Language Film
- List of Swiss submissions for the Academy Award for Best Foreign Language Film
