= Aleksander Bardini =

Polish actor

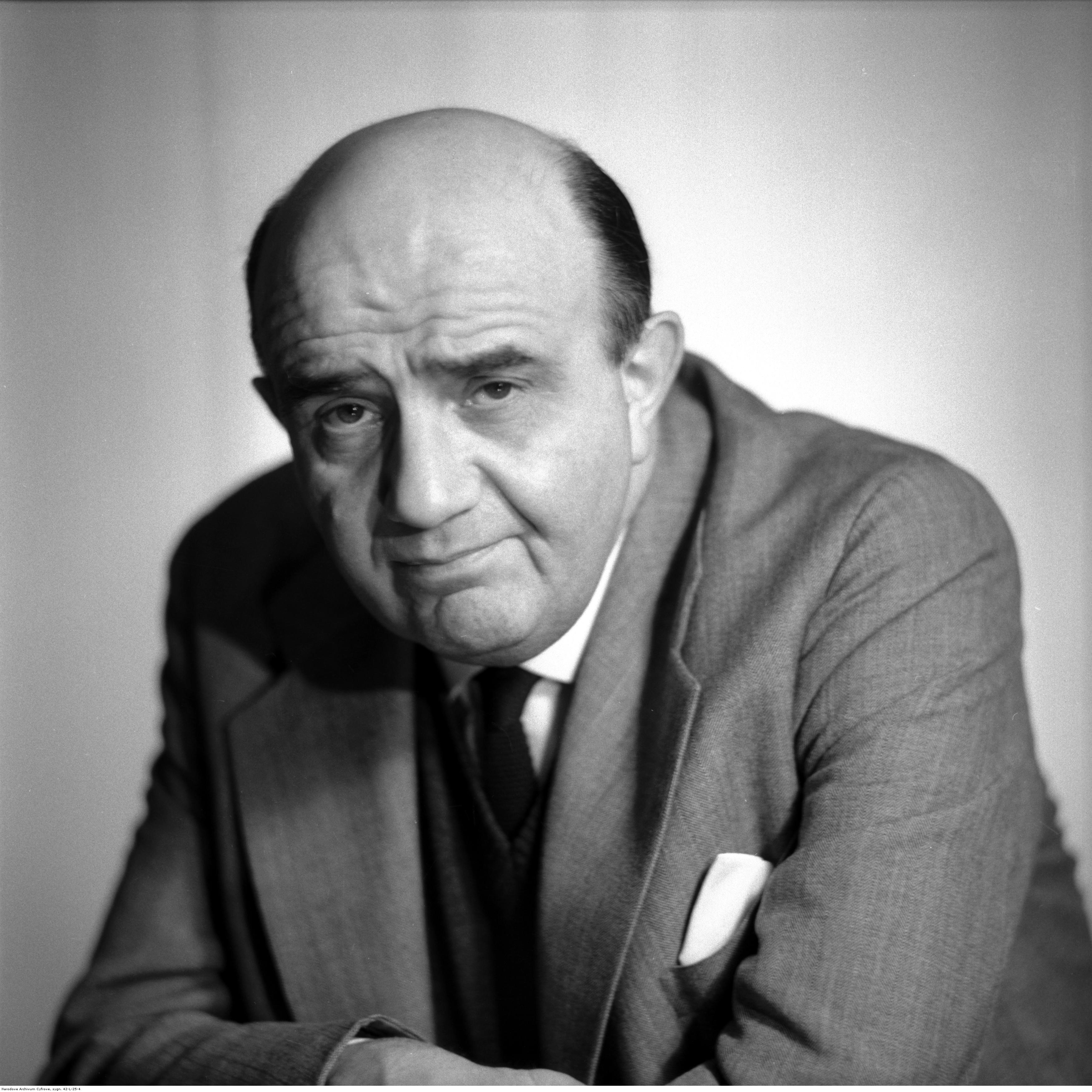
- Born: 17 November 1913; Łódź, Poland
- Died: 30 July 1995 (aged 81); Warsaw, Poland
- Occupation: Actor
- Years active: 1937–1994

Aleksander Bardini (17 November 1913 – 30 July 1995) was a Polish theatre and opera director, actor, notable professor at the State Theatre School in Warsaw. He appeared in 30 films between 1937 and 1994.

== Selected filmography ==
- Long Is the Road (1948)
- Landscape After the Battle (1970)
- Spiral (1978)
- No End (1985)
- The Last Manuscript (1987)
- Dekalog (1988)
- Korczak (1990)
- The Double Life of Véronique (1991)
- Prince of Shadows (1991)
- The Valley of Stone (1992)
- Three Colours: White (1994)
