= Andrzej Zajączkowski =

Polish sociologist, anthropologist, and Africanist (1922-1994)

Andrzej Zajączkowski (27 May 1922 in Lublin – 16 December 1994 in Warsaw) was a Polish sociologist, cultural anthropologist, and Africanist. In 1978 he was made professor of the Polish Academy of Sciences and the University of Warsaw; he became the director of the Center for Studies on Non-European Countries (Polish Academy of Sciences) in 1981. He specialized in historical sociology and the sociology of developing countries. He lectured at universities in Ghana and Uganda.

== Works ==
His most notable works include

- Główne elementy kultury szlacheckiej w Polsce. Ideologia a struktury społeczne (1961)
- Niepodległość Konga a kolonializm belgijski (1968)
- Muntu dzisiaj. Studium afrykanistyczne (1970)
- Szlachta polska. Kultura i struktura (1993).
