= Zbigniew Preisner =

Polish film score composer

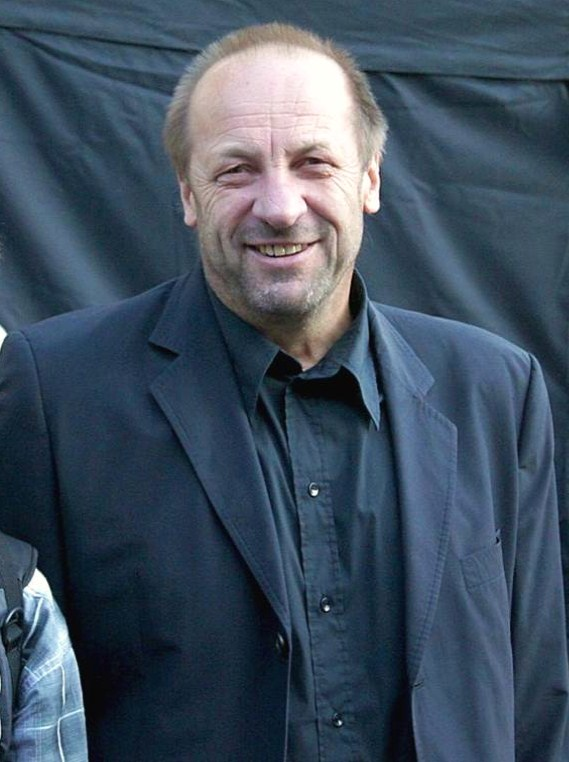
- Preisner in 2011
- Born: Zbigniew Antoni Kowalski; 20 May 1955 (age 71); Bielsko-Biała, Poland
- Occupation: composer
- Years active: 1981 – present
- Website: preisner.com

Zbigniew Preisner (Polish: [ˈzbiɡɲɛf ˈprajsnɛr]; born 20 May 1955 as Zbigniew Antoni Kowalski) is a Polish film score composer, best known for his work with film director Krzysztof Kieślowski. He is the recipient of the Gold Medal for Merit to Culture – Gloria Artis as well as the Knight's Cross of the Order of Polonia Restituta. He is a member of the French Film Academy.

== Life ==
Zbigniew Preisner was born in Bielsko-Biała, southern Poland, and studied history and philosophy at the Jagiellonian University in Kraków. Never having received formal music lessons, he taught himself music by listening and transcribing parts from records. His compositional style represents a distinctively sparse form of tonal neo-Romanticism. Paganini and Jean Sibelius are acknowledged influences.

== Career ==
Preisner is best known for the music composed for the films directed by fellow Pole Krzysztof Kieślowski. His Song for the Unification of Europe, based on the Greek text of 1 Corinthians 13, is attributed to a character in Kieślowski's Three Colours: Blue and plays a dominating role in the story. His music for Three Colours: Red includes a setting of Polish and French versions of a poem by Wisława Szymborska, a Polish Nobel Prize-winning poet.

After working with Kieślowski on Three Colours: Blue, Preisner was hired by the producer Francis Ford Coppola to write the score for The Secret Garden, directed by Polish director Agnieszka Holland. Although Preisner is most closely associated with Kieślowski, he has collaborated with several other directors, winning a César in 1996 for his work on Jean Becker's Élisa. He has won a number of other awards, including another César in 1994 for Three Colours: Red, and the Silver Bear from the 47th Berlin International Film Festival 1997 for The Island on Bird Street. He was nominated for Golden Globe awards for his scores for Three Colours: Blue (1993) and At Play in the Fields of the Lord (1991).

In 1998, Requiem for My Friend, Preisner's first large scale work not written for film, premiered. It was originally intended as a narrative work to be written by Krzysztof Piesiewicz and directed by Kieślowski, but it became a memorial to Kieślowski after the director's death. The Lacrimosa from this Requiem appears in Terrence Malick's The Tree of Life. The Dies Irae from this Requiem appears in the film La Grande Bellezza, directed by Paolo Sorrentino and in the second season of the television series The Crown.

Preisner composed the theme music for the People's Century, a monumental 26-part documentary made jointly in 1994 by the BBC television network in United Kingdom and the PBS television network in the United States. He has also worked with director Thomas Vinterberg on the 2003 film It's All About Love. He provided orchestration for David Gilmour's 2006 album On An Island as well as additional orchestrations for the show at Gdańsk shipyards at which he also conducted the Baltic Philharmonic Orchestra, this was documented on the album Live in Gdańsk (2008). Silence, Night and Dreams is Zbigniew Preisner's new recording project, a large-scale work for orchestra, choir and soloists, based on texts from the Book of Job. The premier recording, was released in 2007 with the lead singer of Madredeus, Teresa Salgueiro and boy soprano Thomas Cully from Libera.

== Van den Budenmayer ==
Van den Budenmayer is a fictitious 18th-century Dutch composer created by Preisner and director Krzysztof Kieślowski for attributions in screenplays. Preisner said Van den Budenmayer is a pseudonym he and Kieślowski invented "because we both loved the Netherlands". Music "by" the Dutch composer plays a role in three Kieślowski films. The first is Dekalog (1988). The second is Three Colours: Blue (1993) in which a theme from his musique funebres is quoted in the Song for the Unification of Europe. Its E minor soprano solo prefigured in the earlier film The Double Life of Veronique (1991), where circumstances in the story prevent the solo from finishing. The third is Three Colours: Red (1994).

== Works ==
=== Orchestral works ===
- Requiem for my friend (1998)
- Life (1998)
- Silence, Night and Dreams (2007)
- On an Island (2006) (a David Gilmour album for which Preisner composed orchestrations for many tracks)
- Live in Gdańsk (September 22, 2008) (a David Gilmour live album)
- Diaries Of Hope (2013)
- Rattle That Lock (2015) (another David Gilmour album for which Preisner provided orchestrations)

=== Music for solo instruments ===
- 10 Easy Pieces for Piano (2000)
  Performed by Leszek Możdżer
- 10 Pieces for Orchestra (2015)
  Performed by The Symphonic Orchestra of the Calisia Philharmonic

=== Theatre ===
- Das Begräbnis (The Funeral) (2010)
  a play by Thomas Vinterberg and Mogens Rukov

=== Film scores ===
- Prognoza pogody (1981)
- Bez konca (1985)
- Lubie nietoperze (1986)
- Przez dotyk (1986)
- The Lullabye (1987)
- Ucieczka (1987)
- To Kill a Priest (1988)
- A Short Film About Killing (1988)
- A Short Film About Love (1988)
- Kocham kino (1988)
- Dekalog (1988-9)
- Ostatni dzwonek (1989)
- Europa Europa (1990)
- Eminent Domain (1991)
- The Double Life of Véronique (1991)
- At Play in the Fields of the Lord (1991)
- Zwolnieni z zycia (1992)
- Olivier, Olivier (1992)
- Damage (1992)
- Three Colours: Blue (1993)
- The Secret Garden (1993)
- On the Edge of the Horizon (1993)
- Desire in Motion (Mouvements du désir) (1994)
- Kouarteto se 4 kiniseis (1994)
- Three Colours: White (1994)
- When a Man Loves a Woman (1994)
- Three Colours: Red (1994)
- Feast of July (1995)
- Élisa (1995)
- Foolish Heart (1996)
- FairyTale: A True Story (1997)
- The Island on Bird Street (1997)
- The Last September (1999)
- Dreaming of Joseph Lees (1999)
- Aberdeen (2000)
- Weiser (2001)
- Between Strangers (2002)
- It's All About Love (2003)
- Strange Gardens (2003)
- Kolysanka (2003)
- SuperTex (2003)
- The Beautiful Country (2004)
- Sportsman of the Century (2006)
- Anonyma - Eine Frau in Berlin (2008)
- Aglaja (2012)
- Lost and Love (2015)
- Lies We Tell (2017)
- Valley of Shadows (2017)
- Man of God (2021)
