= Tramway (film) =

- Directed by: Krzysztof Kieślowski
- Written by: Krzysztof Kieślowski
- Cinematography: Zdzisław Kaczmarek
- Release date: 1966
- Running time: 5 minutes

Tramway (Polish: Tramwaj) is a 1966 short silent film by Polish director Krzysztof Kieślowski, produced while he was a student at the Łódź Film School. The film is included as an extra feature on the American and Artificial Eye Region 2 DVD releases of Kieslowski's A Short Film About Love.

The film shows a boy who sees a girl on a tram as it is leaving. He runs after the tram and finds himself on board alone with the girl. They exchange glances, then she falls asleep against the window. The boy gets off the tram and looks at her through the window, then decides to run after the tram again.

== Cast ==
- Jerzy Braszka - boy
- Maria Janiec - girl
