= Krzysztof Kieślowski =

Polish film director and screenwriter (1941–1996)

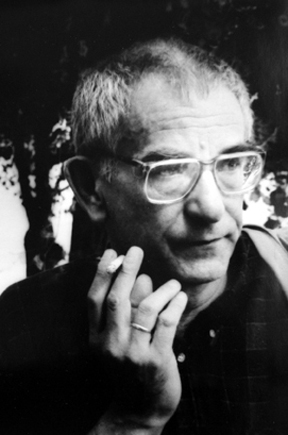
- Kieślowski in 1994
- Born: 27 June 1941; Warsaw, German-occupied Poland
- Died: 14 March 1996 (aged 54); Warsaw, Poland
- Education: Łódź Film School
- Occupations: Film director, screenwriter
- Spouse: Maria Cautillo (m. 1967)
- Children: 1

Krzysztof Kieślowski (Polish: [ˈkʂɨʂtɔf kʲɛɕˈlɔfskʲi], 27 June 1941 – 14 March 1996) was a Polish film director and screenwriter. He is known internationally for Dekalog (1989), The Double Life of Veronique (1991), and the Three Colours trilogy (1993–1994).

Kieślowski received numerous awards during his career, including the Cannes Film Festival Jury Prize (1988), FIPRESCI Prize (1988, 1991), and Prize of the Ecumenical Jury (1991), the Venice Film Festival FIPRESCI Prize (1989), Golden Lion (1993), and OCIC Award (1993), and the Berlin International Film Festival Silver Bear (1994). In 1995, he received Academy Award nominations for Best Director and Best Original Screenplay. In 2002, Kieślowski was listed at number two on the British Film Institute's Sight & Sound list of the top ten film directors of modern times. In 2007, Total Film magazine ranked him at No. 47 on its "100 Greatest Film Directors Ever" list.

== Early life ==
Kieślowski was born in Warsaw, Poland, the son of Barbara (née Szonert) and Roman Kieślowski. He grew up in several small towns, moving wherever his engineer father, a tuberculosis patient, could find treatment. He was raised Roman Catholic and retained what he called a "personal and private" relationship with God. At sixteen, he attended a firefighters' training school but dropped out after three months. Without any career goals, he then entered the College for Theatre Technicians in Warsaw in 1957 because it was run by a relative. He wanted to become a theatre director, but lacked the required bachelor's degree for the theatre department, so he chose to study film as an intermediate step.

== Career ==
Leaving college and working as a theatrical tailor, Kieślowski applied to the Łódź Film School, which has Roman Polanski and Andrzej Wajda among its alumni. He was rejected twice. To avoid compulsory military service during this time, he briefly became an art student, and also went on a drastic diet to make himself medically unfit for service. After several months of avoiding the draft, he was accepted to the school's directing department in 1964, on his third attempt. He attended Łódź Film School until 1968 and, despite state censorship and interdiction on foreign travel, was able to travel around Poland for his documentary research and filming. Kieślowski lost his interest in theatre and decided to make documentary films.

=== 1966–1980: Early work ===
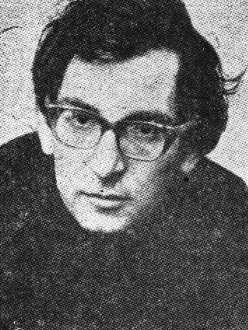
Kieślowski in 1972

Kieślowski's early documentaries focused on the everyday lives of city dwellers, workers, and soldiers. Though he was not an overtly political filmmaker, he soon found that attempting to depict Polish life accurately brought him into conflict with the authorities. His television film Workers '71: Nothing About Us Without Us, which showed workers discussing the reasons for the mass strikes of 1970, was only shown in a drastically censored form. After Workers '71, he turned his eye on the authorities themselves in Curriculum Vitae, a film that combined documentary footage of Politburo meetings with a fictional story about a man under scrutiny by the officials. Though Kieślowski believed the film's message was anti-authoritarian, he was criticized by his colleagues for cooperating with the government in its production. Kieślowski later said that he abandoned documentary filmmaking due to two experiences: the censorship of Workers '71, which caused him to doubt whether truth could be told literally under an authoritarian regime, and an incident during the filming of Station (1981) in which some of his footage was nearly used as evidence in a criminal case. He decided that fiction not only allowed more artistic freedom but could portray everyday life more truthfully.

=== 1975–1988: Polish film career ===
His first non-documentary feature, Personnel (1975), was made for television and won him first prize at the Mannheim Film Festival. Both Personnel and his next feature, The Scar (Blizna), were works of social realism with large casts: Personnel was about technicians working on a stage production, based on his early college experience, and The Scar showed the upheaval of a small town by a poorly planned industrial project. These films were shot in a documentary style with many nonprofessional actors; like his earlier films, they portrayed everyday life under the weight of an oppressive system, but without overt commentary. Camera Buff (Amator, 1979) (which won the grand prize at the 11th Moscow International Film Festival) and Blind Chance (Przypadek, 1981) continued along similar lines, but focused more on the ethical choices faced by a single character rather than a community. During this period, Kieślowski was considered part of a loose movement with other Polish directors of the time, including Janusz Kijowski, Andrzej Wajda, and Agnieszka Holland, called the Cinema of moral anxiety. His links with these directors, Holland in particular, caused concern within the Polish government, and each of his early films was subjected to censorship and enforced re-shooting/re-editing, if not banned outright. For example, Blind Chance was not released domestically until 1987, almost six years after it had been completed.

No End (Bez końca, 1984) was perhaps his most clearly political film, depicting political trials in Poland during martial law, from the unusual point of view of a lawyer's ghost and his widow. At the time it was harshly criticized by both the government, dissidents, and the church. Starting with No End, Kieślowski closely collaborated with two people, the composer Zbigniew Preisner and the trial lawyer Krzysztof Piesiewicz, whom Kieślowski met while researching political trials under martial law for a planned documentary on the subject. Piesiewicz co-wrote the screenplays for all of Kieślowski's subsequent films. Preisner is best known for collaborating with Kieślowski on the scores for the Three Colors trilogy.

Preisner provided the musical score for No End and most subsequent of Kieślowski's films and often plays a prominent part. Many of Preisner's pieces are referred to and discussed by the films' characters as being the work of the (fictional) Dutch composer "Van den Budenmayer".

Dekalog (1988), a series of ten short films set in a Warsaw tower block, each nominally based on one of the Ten Commandments, was created for Polish television with funding from West Germany; it is now one of the most critically acclaimed film cycles of all time. Co-written by Kieślowski and Piesiewicz, the ten one-hour-long episodes had originally been intended for ten different directors, but Kieślowski found himself unable to relinquish control over the project and directed all episodes himself. Episodes five and six were released internationally in a longer form as A Short Film About Killing and A Short Film About Love respectively. Kieślowski had also planned to shoot a full-length version of Episode 9 under the title A Short Film About Jealousy, but exhaustion eventually prevented him from making what would have been his thirteenth film in less than a year.

=== 1990–1994: Commercial success abroad ===
Kieślowski's last four films, his most commercially successful, were foreign co-productions, made mainly with money from France and in particular from Romanian-born producer Marin Karmitz. These focused on moral and metaphysical issues along lines similar to Dekalog and Blind Chance but on a more abstract level, with smaller casts, more internal stories, and less interest in communities. Poland appeared in these films mostly through the eyes of European outsiders.

The first of these was The Double Life of Veronique (La double vie de Veronique, 1990), which starred Irène Jacob. The commercial success of this film gave Kieślowski the funding for his ambitious final films (1993–94), the trilogy Three Colours (Blue, White, Red), which explores the virtues symbolized by the French flag. The three films garnered prestigious international awards, including the Golden Lion for Best Film at the Venice Film Festival and the Silver Bear for Best Director at the Berlin Film Festival, in addition to three Academy Award nominations.

Kieślowski announced his retirement from filmmaking after the premiere of his last film Red at the 1994 Cannes Film Festival.

=== Posthumous work ===
At the time of his death, Kieślowski was working with his longterm collaborator Piesiewicz on a second trilogy: Heaven, Hell and Purgatory. After his death, the scripts were adapted and produced by three different directors: Heaven by Tom Tykwer in 2002, Hell ("L'Enfer") by Danis Tanović in 2005 and Purgatory by Stanislaw Mucha in 2007.

=== Casting ===
Kieślowski often used the same actors in key roles in his films, including:

- Artur Barciś in No End, Dekalog, A Short Film About Love, and A Short Film About Killing
- Aleksander Bardini in No End, Dekalog, The Double Life of Veronique, and Three Colours: White
- Tadeusz Bradecki in Camera Buff and No End
- Irène Jacob in The Double Life of Veronique and Three Colours: Red
- Bogusław Linda in Blind Chance and Dekalog
- Maria Pakulnis in No End and Dekalog
- Jerzy Stuhr in The Scar, Camera Buff, Blind Chance, Dekalog, and Three Colours: White
- Grażyna Szapołowska in No End, Dekalog, and A Short Film About Love
- Zbigniew Zamachowski in Dekalog, and Three Colours: White
- Janusz Gajos in Dekalog, and Three Colours: White

== Personal life ==
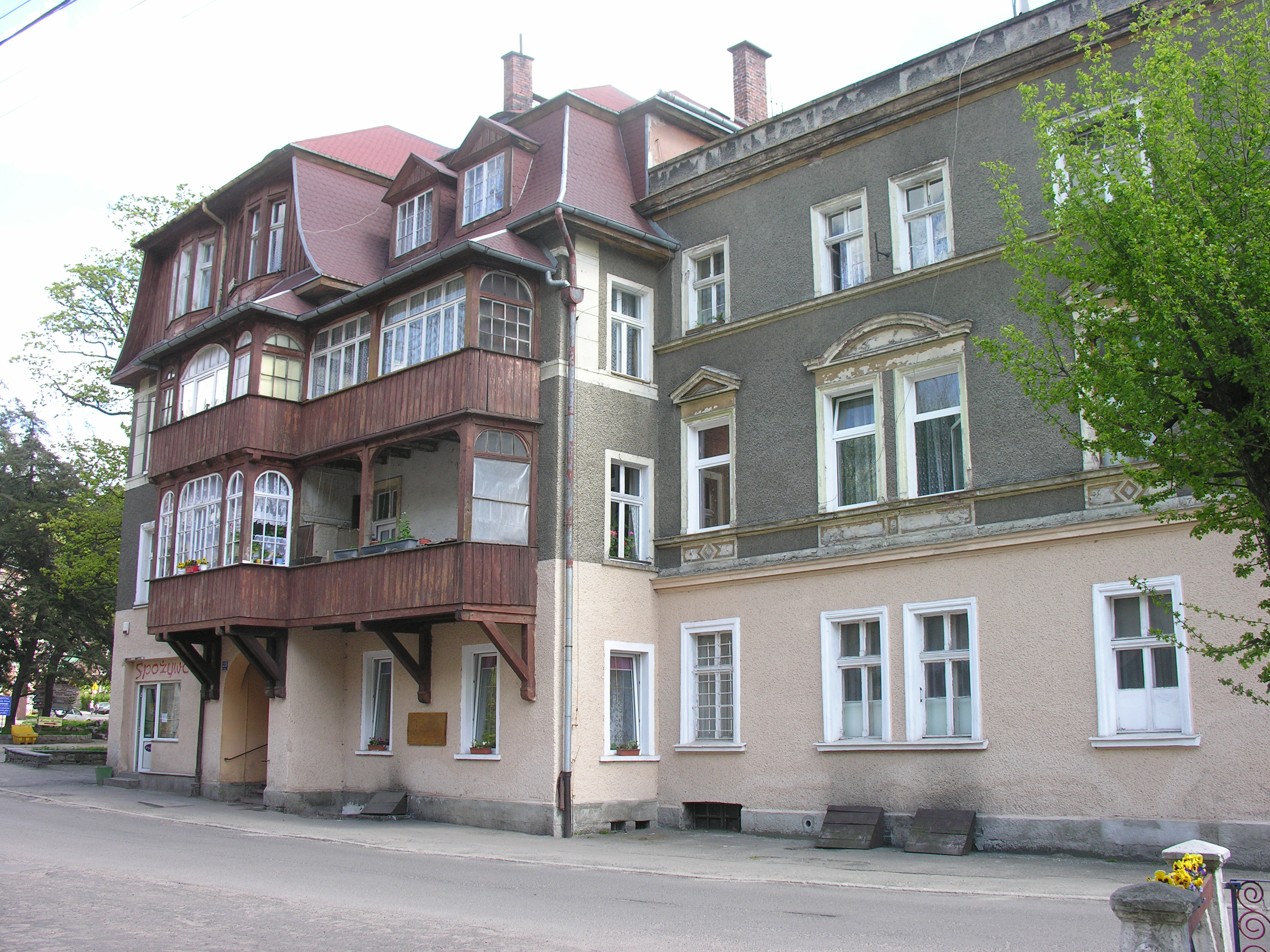
The house at 23 Główna Street in Sokołowsko where Kieślowski lived

Kieślowski married his lifelong love, Maria (Marysia) Cautillo, on 21 January 1967 during his final year in film school. They had a daughter, and remained married until his death.

He characterized himself as having "one good characteristic, I am a pessimist. I always imagine the worst. To me, the future is a black hole." He has been described as "conveying the sadness of a world-weary sage", "a brooding intellectual and habitual pessimist". When visiting the United States, he was amazed at "the pursuit of empty talk combined with a very high degree of self-satisfaction". Film director and Kieślowski's friend, Agnieszka Holland, revealed that he used to experience depressive states.

He described himself as an agnostic; however, he considered the Old Testament and the Biblical Decalogue as a moral compass in difficult times.

== Death ==
On 14 March 1996, less than two years after he had retired, Kieślowski died at age 54 during open-heart surgery following a heart attack. He was interred in Powązki Cemetery in Warsaw. His grave has a sculpture of the thumb and forefingers of two hands forming an oblong space; the classic view as if through a film camera. The small sculpture is in black marble on a pedestal slightly over a metre tall. The slab with Kieślowski's name and dates lies below.

Kieślowski's longtime friend and collaborator, composer Zbigniew Preisner, wrote Requiem for My Friend (Requiem dla mojego przyjaciela) in Kieślowski's honour after his death.

== Legacy ==
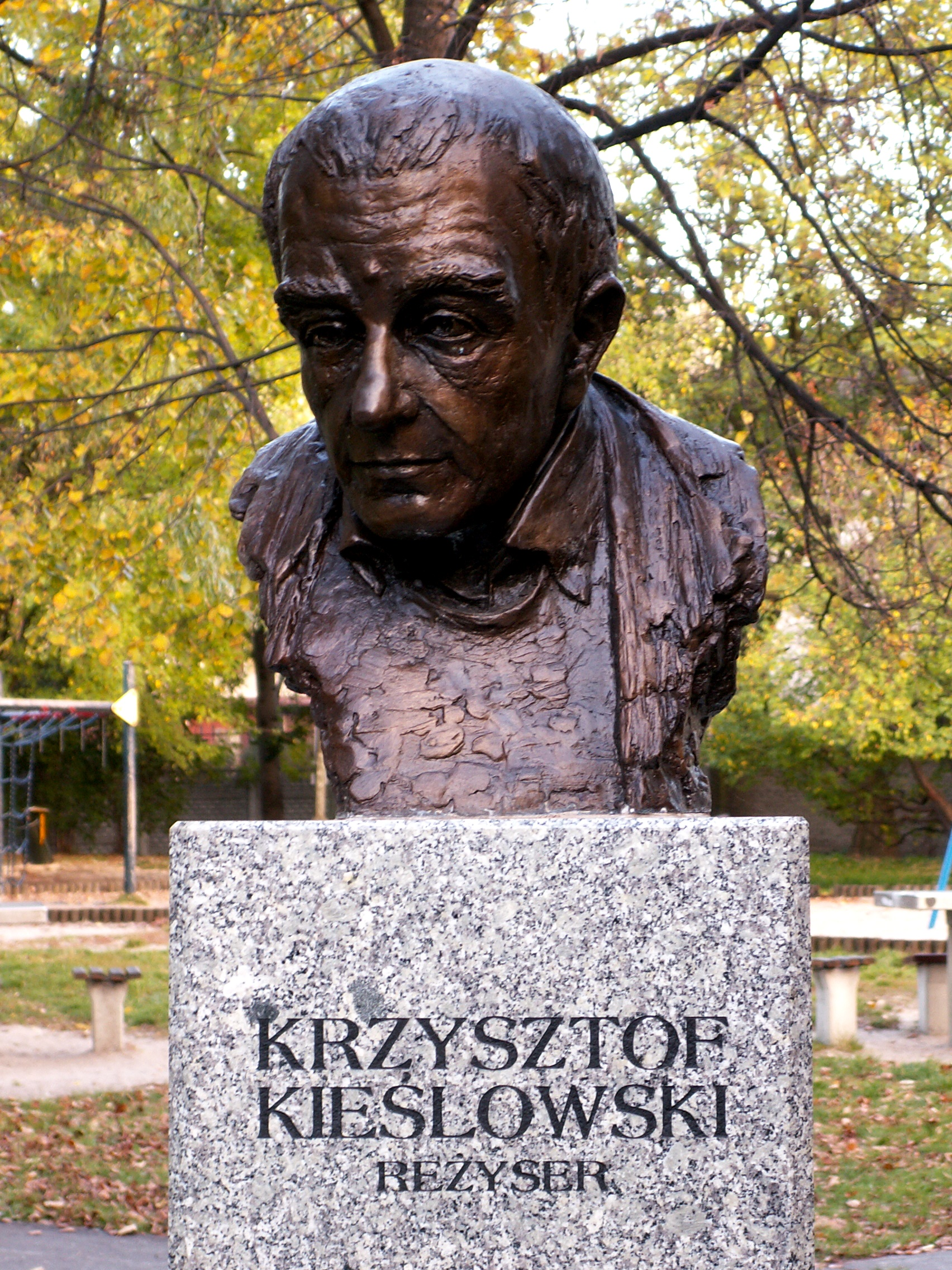
Bust of Kieślowski, Celebrity Alley, Kielce, Poland

Kieślowski remains one of Europe's most influential directors, his works included in the study of film classes at universities throughout the world. The 1993 book Kieślowski on Kieślowski describes his life and work in his own words, based on interviews by Danusia Stok. He is the subject of a biographical film, Krzysztof Kieślowski: I'm So-So (1995), directed by Krzysztof Wierzbicki.

After Kieślowski's death, Harvey Weinstein, then head of Miramax Films, which distributed the last four Kieślowski films in the US, wrote a eulogy for him in Premiere magazine.

Though he had claimed to be retiring after Three Colours, at the time of his death, Kieślowski was working on a new trilogy co-written with Piesiewicz, consisting of Heaven, Hell, and Purgatory and inspired by Dante's The Divine Comedy. As was originally intended for Dekalog, the scripts were ostensibly intended to be given to other directors for filming, but Kieślowski's untimely death means it is unknown whether he might have broken his self-imposed retirement to direct the trilogy himself. The only completed screenplay, Heaven, was filmed by Tom Tykwer and premiered in 2002 at the Berlin International Film Festival. The other two scripts existed only as thirty-page treatments at the time of Kieślowski's death; Piesiewicz has since completed these screenplays, with Hell, directed by Bosnian director Danis Tanović and starring Emmanuelle Béart, released in 2005. Purgatory, about a photographer killed in the Bosnian war, remains unproduced. The 2007 film Nadzieja (Hope), directed by Ibo Kurdo and Stanislaw Mucha, also scripted by Piesiewicz, has been incorrectly identified as the third part of the trilogy, but is in fact, an unrelated project.

Jerzy Stuhr, who starred in several Kieślowski films and co-wrote Camera Buff, filmed his own adaptation of an unfilmed Kieślowski script as The Big Animal (Duże zwierzę) in 2000.

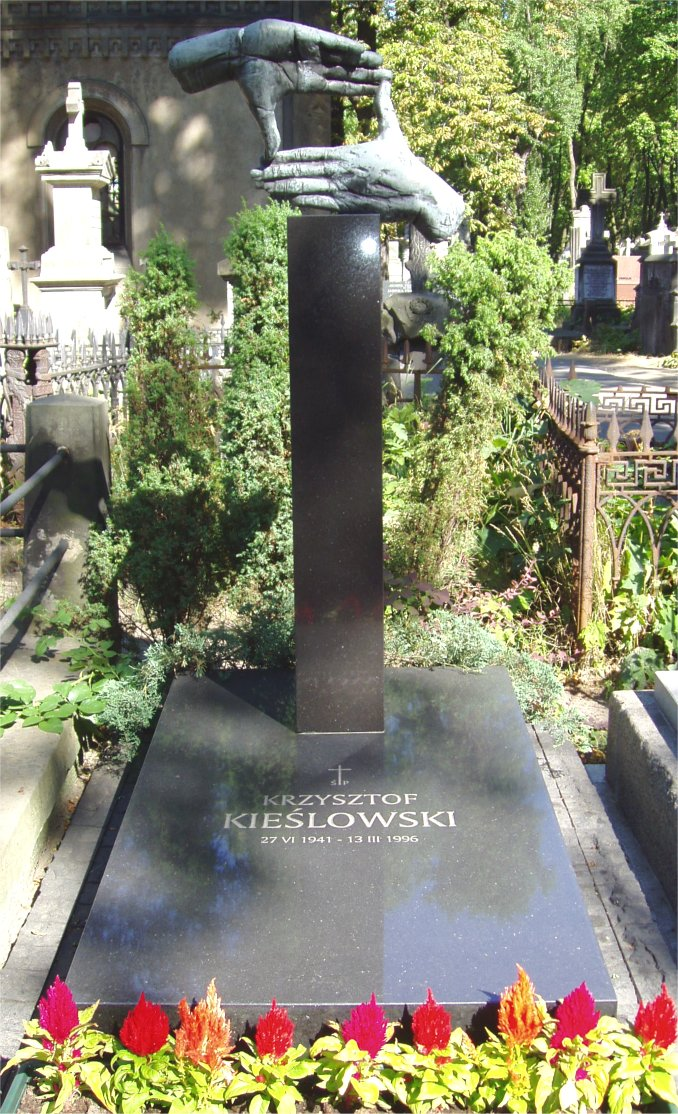
Kieślowski's grave

In an interview given at Oxford University in 1995, Kieślowski said:

It comes from a deep-rooted conviction that if there is anything worthwhile doing for the sake of culture, then it is touching on subject matters and situations which link people, and not those that divide people. There are too many things in the world which divide people, such as religion, politics, history, and nationalism. ... Feelings are what link people together, because the word 'love' has the same meaning for everybody. Or 'fear', or 'suffering'. We all fear the same way and the same things. And we all love in the same way. That's why I tell about these things, because in all other things I immediately find division.

In the foreword to Dekalog: The Ten Commandments, American filmmaker Stanley Kubrick wrote:

I am always reluctant to single out some particular feature of the work of a major filmmaker because it tends inevitably to simplify and reduce the work. But in this book of screenplays by Krzysztof Kieślowski and his co-author, Krzysztof Piesiewicz, it should not be out of place to observe that they have the very rare ability to dramatize their ideas rather than just talking about them. By making their points through the dramatic action of the story they gain the added power of allowing the audience to discover what's really going on rather than being told. They do this with such dazzling skill, you never see the ideas coming and don't realize until much later how profoundly they have reached your heart.

Stanley Kubrick

January 1991

In 2012, Cyrus Frisch voted for A Short Film About Killing as one of "the best-damned films" with the comment: "In Poland, this film was instrumental in the abolition of the death penalty." Since 1952, Sight & Sound magazine conducts a poll every ten years of the world's finest film directors to determine the Ten Greatest Films of All Time, which has become the most recognised poll of its kind in the world.

Since 2011, the Polish Contemporary Art Foundation In Situ has been organizing The Sokołowsko Film Festival: Hommage à Kieślowski. It is an annual film festival in Sokołowsko, where Kieślowski spent a part of his youth, and commemorates the director's work with screenings of his films, as well as films of younger generations of filmmakers both from Poland and Europe, accompanied by creative workshops, panel discussions, performances, exhibitions and concerts.

On 27 June 2021, Google celebrated his 80th birthday with a Google Doodle.

== Filmography ==
In total, Kieślowski wrote and directed 48 films, out of which 11 are feature films, 19 are documentaries, 12 are TV films, and 6 are shorts.

=== Documentaries and short subjects ===
- The Face (Twarz, 1966), as actor
- The Office (Urząd, 1966)
- Tramway (Tramwaj, 1966)
- Concert of Requests (Koncert życzeń, 1967)
- The Photograph (Zdjęcie, 1968)
- From the City of Łódź (Z miasta Łodzi, 1968)
- I Was a Soldier (Byłem żołnierzem, 1970)
- Factory (Fabryka, 1971)
- Workers '71: Nothing About Us Without Us (Robotnicy '71: Nic o nas bez nas, 1971)
- Before the Rally (Przed rajdem, 1971)
- Between Wrocław and Zielona Góra (Między Wrocławiem a Zieloną Górą, 1972)
- The Principles of Safety and Hygiene in a Copper Mine (Podstawy BHP w kopalni miedzi, 1972)
- Gospodarze (1972)
- Refrain (Refren, 1972)
- The Bricklayer (Murarz, 1973)
- First Love (Pierwsza miłość, 1974)
- X-Ray (Przeswietlenie, 1974)
- Pedestrian Subway (Przejście podziemne, 1974)
- Curriculum Vitae (Życiorys, 1975)
- Hospital (Szpital, 1976)
- Slate (Klaps, 1976)
- From a Night Porter's Point of View (Z punktu widzenia nocnego portiera, 1977)
- I Don't Know (Nie wiem, 1977)
- Seven Women of Different Ages (Siedem kobiet w roznym wieku, 1978)
- Railway Station (Dworzec, 1980)
- Talking Heads (Gadające glowy, 1980)
- Seven Days a Week (Siedem dni tygodniu, 1988)

=== Feature films and TV drama ===
Feature films and TV drama
Year	English Title	Original Title	Type
1975	Personnel	Personel	TV drama
1976	The Scar	Blizna	Film
1976	The Calm	Spokój	Film
1979	The Card Index	Kartoteka	TV drama
1979	Camera Buff	Amator	Film
1981	Blind Chance	Przypadek	Film
1981	Short Working Day	Krótki dzień pracy	Film
1985	No End	Bez końca	Film
1988	A Short Film About Killing	Krótki film o zabijaniu	Film
1988	A Short Film About Love	Krótki film o miłości	Film
1989	Dekalog	—N/a	TV drama
1991	The Double Life of Véronique	Podwójne życie Weroniki, La Double vie de Véronique	Film
1993	Three Colours: Blue	Trois couleurs: Bleu, Trzy kolory: Niebieski	Film
1994	Three Colours: White	Trois couleurs: Blanc, Trzy kolory: Biały	Film
1994	Three Colours: Red	Trois couleurs: Rouge, Trzy kolory: Czerwony	Film

== Awards and nominations ==
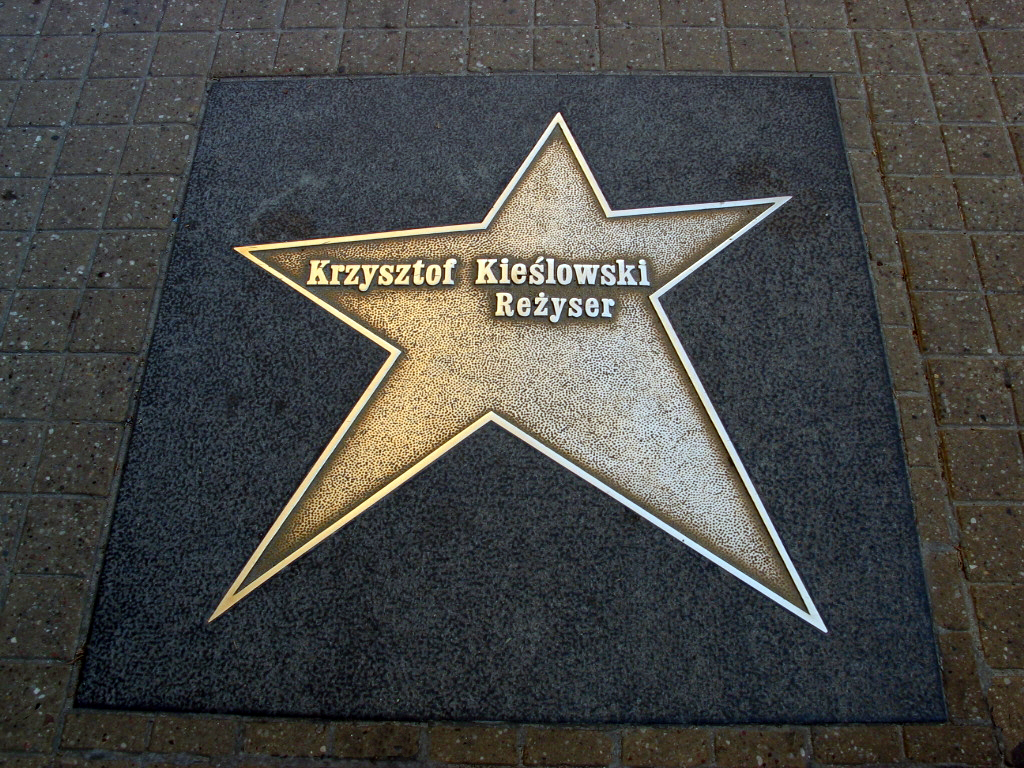
Kieślowski's star on the Walk of Fame in Łódź, Poland

Krzysztof Kieślowski earned numerous awards and nominations throughout his career, dating back to the Kraków Film Festival Golden Hobby-Horse in 1974. The following is a list of awards and nominations earned for his later work.

A Short Film About Killing

- European Film Award for Best Film (1988) Won
- Cannes Film Festival FIPRESCI Prize (1988) Won
- Cannes Film Festival Jury Prize Won
- Cannes Film Festival Nomination for the Palme d'Or (1988)
- French Syndicate of Cinema Critics Award for Best Foreign Film (1990) Won
- Bodil Award for Best European Film (1990) Won

Dekalog

- Bodil Award for Best European Film (1991) Won
- Venice Film Festival Children and Cinema Award (1989) Won
- Venice Film Festival FIPRESCI Prize (1989) Won

The Double Life of Veronique

- Argentine Film Critics Association Silver Condor Nomination for Best Foreign Film (1992)
- Cannes Film Festival FIPRESCI Prize (1991) Won
- Cannes Film Festival Prize of the Ecumenical Jury (1991) Won
- Cannes Film Festival Nomination for the Palme d'Or (1991)
- French Syndicate of Cinema Critics Award for Best Foreign Film (1992) Won
- Warsaw International Film Festival Audience Award (1991) Won

Three Colours: Blue

- César Award Nomination for Best Director (1994)
- César Award Nomination for Best Film (1994)
- César Award Nomination for Best Original Screenplay or Adaptation (1994)
- Venice Film Festival Golden Ciak Award (1993) Won
- Venice Film Festival Golden Lion Award (1993) Won
- Venice Film Festival Little Golden Lion Award, Won
- Venice Film Festival OCIC Award (1993) Won

Three Colours: White

- Berlin International Film Festival Silver Bear for Best Director (1994) Won

Three Colours: Red

- Academy Award Nomination for Best Director (1995)
- Academy Award Nomination for Best Original Screenplay (1995)
- BAFTA Film Award Nomination for Best Film not in the English Language (1995)
- BAFTA Film Award Nomination for Best Adapted Screenplay (1995)
- BAFTA Film Award Nomination for the David Lean Award for Direction (1995)
- Bodil Award for Best Non-American Film (1995) Won
- Cannes Film Festival Nomination for the Palme d'Or (1994)
- César Award Nomination for Best Director (1995)
- César Award Nomination for Best Film (1995)
- César Award Nomination for Best Original Screenplay or Adaptation (1995)
- French Syndicate of Cinema Critics Award for Best Film (1995) Won
- Vancouver International Film Festival Most Popular Film (1994) Won

== See also ==
- Cinema of Poland
- List of Polish people
- List of Academy Award winners and nominees from Poland

== Bibliography ==
- Amiel, Vincent (1995). Kieślowski. Paris: Editions Payot and Rivages. ISBN 2-86930-992-9.
- Andrew, Geoff (1998). The Three Colours Trilogy. London: BFI Publishing. ISBN 0-85170-569-3.
- Attolini, Vito (1998). Krzysztof Kieślowski. Taranto: Barbieri. ISBN 88-86187-34-3.
- Bleeckere, Sylvian de (1994). Levenswaarden en levensverhalen: een studie van de decaloog van Kieślowski. Leuven: Acco. ISBN 90-334-2852-0.
- Campan, Véronique (1993). Dix breves histoires d'image: le Decalogue de Krzysztof Kieślowski. Paris: Presses de la Sorbonne nouvelle. ISBN 2-87854-041-7.
- Coates, Paul (1999). Lucid Dreams: The Films of Krzysztof Kieślowski. Wiltshire: Flicks Books. ISBN 0-948911-63-8.
- Dalla Rosa, Richard (2003). La fascination des doubles: selon La double vie de Véronique de Krzysztof Kieślowski. Sarreguemines: Edition Pierron. ISBN 2-7085-0307-3.
- Dzieko'nska, El'zbieta (2002). The best of all worlds: public, personal and inner realms in the films of Krzysztof Kieślowski. London: University of London (PhD Thesis).
- Enser, Martha (1995). Krzysztof Kieślowski: das Gesamtwerk. Wien: Universitat Diplomarbeit.
- Erbstein, Monika. Untersuchungen zur Filmsprache im Werk von Kryzstof Kieślowski. Alfeld: Coppi Verlag. ISBN 3-930258-57-9.
- Esteve, Michel, ed. (1994). Krzysztof Kieślowski. Paris: Lettres Modernes. ISBN 2-256-90934-4.
- Franca, Andrea (1996). Cinema em azul, branco e vermelo: a trilogia de Kieślowski. Rio de Janeiro: Sette Letras. ISBN 85-85625-51-1.
- Fritz, Heiko (2004). Was von der DDR bleibt oder die produzierte Geschichte mit einem Blick auf das filmwerk von Krzysztof Kieślowski. Oldenberg: Igel Verlag. ISBN 3-89621-178-1.
- Furdal, Malgorzata, ed. (2001). Remembering Krzysztof: il cinema di Kieślowski. Udine: Centro espressioni cinematografiche; Pordenone: Cinemazero.
- Furdal, Malgorzata, Turigliatto, Roberto, eds. (1989). Kieślowski. Torino: Museo nazionale del cinema.
- Garbowski, Christopher (1996). Krzysztof Kieślowski's Decalogue series: the problem of the protagonists and their self-transcendence. Boulder: East European Monographs. ISBN 0-88033-349-9.
- Haltof, Marek (2004). The Cinema of Krzysztof Kieślowski: Variations on Destiny and Chance. London: Wallflower Press. ISBN 1-903364-92-2 (hbk) ISBN 1-903364-91-4 (pbk).
- Insdorf, Annette (2002). Double Lives, Second Chances: The Cinema of Krzysztof Kieślowski. New York: Hyperion Miramax Books. ISBN 0-7868-8474-6.
- Jazdon, Mikolaj (2002). Dokumenty Kieślowskiego. Pozna'n: Wydawnictwo Pozna'nskie. ISBN 83-7177-022-7.
- Kickasola, Joe (2004). The Films of Krzysztof Kieślowski. London: Continuum. ISBN 0-8264-1558-X (hbk) ISBN 0-8264-1559-8 (pbk).
- Kieślowski, Krzysztof (1998). Przypadek i inne teksty. Kraków: Znak. ISBN 83-7006-702-6.
- Kieślowski, Krzysztof Piesiewicz, Krzystof (1999). Raj, czyś'ciec, pieklo: [three novels in one case]. Warsaw: Skorpion. ISBN 83-86466-30-8 (vol 1) ISBN 83-86466-31-6 (vol 2) ISBN 83-86466-32-4 (vol 3).
- Kieślowski, Krzystof; Piesiewicz, Krzystof (1991). The Decalogue: The Ten Commandments. London: Faber and Faber. ISBN 0-571-14498-5.
- Kieślowski, Krzystof; Piesiewicz, Krzystof (1998). Three Colours Trilogy. London: Faber and Faber. ISBN 0-571-17892-8.
- Lagorio, Gina (1992). Il decalogo di Kieślowski: ricreazione narritiva. Casale Monferrato: Piemme. ISBN 88-384-1634-6.
- Lesch, Walter; Loretan, Matthias, et al. (1993). Das Gewicht der Gebote und die Moglichkeiten der Kunst: Krzysztof Kieślowskis Dekalog Filme als ethische Modelle. Freiburg, Schweiz: Universitatsverlag; Freiburg: Herder. ISBN 3-7278-0910-8 (Univerlag) ISBN 3-451-23275-8 (Herder).
- Lubelski, Tadeusz, ed. (1997). Kino Krzysztofa Kieślowskiego. Kraków: Universitas. ISBN 83-7052-926-7.
- Murri, Serafino (1996). Krzysztof Kieślowski. Milan: Il Castoro. ISBN 88-8033-061-6.
- Rimini, Stefania (2000). L'etica dello sguardo : introduzione al cinema di Krzysztof Kieślowski. Napoli: Liguori. ISBN 88-207-2996-2.
- Ripa di Meana, Gabriella (1998). La morale dell'altro: scritti sull'inconscio dal Decalogo di Kieślowski. Firenze: Liberal libri. ISBN 88-8270-009-7.
- Rodriguez Chico, Julio (2004). Azul, Blanco, Rojo : Kieślowski en busca de la libertad y el amor. Madrid: Ediciones Internacionales Universitarias. ISBN 84-8469-111-X.
- Simonigh, Chiara (2000). La danza dei miseri destini: il Decalogo di Krzyzstof Kieślowski. Torino: Testo and immagine. ISBN 88-86498-90-X.
- Spadaro, Antonio (1999). Lo sguardo presente : una lettura teologica di "Breve film sull'amore" di K. Kieślowski. Rimini: Guaraldi. ISBN 88-8049-166-0.
- Stok, Danusia, ed. (1993). Kieślowski on Kieślowski. London: Faber and Faber. ISBN 0-571-17328-4.
- Termine, Laborio (2002). Immagine e rappresentazione. Torino: Testo and immagine. ISBN 88-8382-081-9.
- Wach, Margarete (2000). Krzysztof Kieślowski: kino der moralischen Unruhe. Köln: KIM; Marburg: Schuren. ISBN 3-934311-06-7 (KIM) ISBN 3-89472-360-2 (Schuren).
- Wilson, Emma (2000). Memory and Survival: The French Cinema of Krzysztof Kieślowski. Oxford: Legenda. ISBN 1-900755-27-0.
- Wizner, Dariusz (2002). Stile cinematografico di Krzysztof Kieślowski. Roma: Universita Pontificia Salesiana. Thesis.
- Wollermann, Tobias (2002). Zur musik in der Drei Farben: triologie von Krzysztof Kieślowski. Osnabrück: Epos Musik. ISBN 3-923486-38-3.
- Woodward, Steven, ed. (2009). After Kieślowski: The Legacy of Krzysztof Kieślowski. Detroit: Wayne State UP. ISBN 978-0-8143-3326-6.
- Zawiśliński, Stanislaw, ed. (1996). Kieślowski: album pod redakcja Stanislawa Zawiślińskiego; teksty [by] Krzysztof Kieślowski ...[et al.]. Warsaw: Skorpion. ISBN 83-86466-11-1.
- Žižek, Slavoj (2001). The Fright of Real Tears: Krzysztof Kieślowski Between Theory and Post-Theory. London: BFI Publishing. ISBN 0-85170-755-6 (hbk) ISBN 0-85170-754-8 (pbk).
