= Kieślowski on Kieślowski =

1993 book edited by Danusia Stok

- Editor: Danusia Stok
- Translator: Danusia Stok
- Language: English
- Series: Faber Film
- Subject: Krzysztof Kieślowski
- Publisher: Faber & Faber
- Publication date: 1993
- Publication place: United Kingdom
- Pages: 268
- ISBN: 0571167330

Kieślowski on Kieślowski is a book about the life and work of the Polish filmmaker Krzysztof Kieślowski, edited by Danusia Stok and originally published in English in 1993.

== Summary ==
The book mainly consists of Danusia Stok's interviews with Kieślowski held in Paris in December 1991, May 1992 and the summer of 1993. It also includes parts from a 1990 lecture by Kieślowski and texts he wrote for the Swiss magazine Du. There is an introductory part about Kieślowski's childhood and youth, but the main focus is his films.

== Reception ==
The book was published by Faber & Faber in 1993 as part of its Faber Film series. Jan Uhde wrote in Kinema that the book demystifies the way censorship worked in communist Poland and reveals Kieślowski's way of thinking and working through small but telling remarks, characterised by unpretentiousness and "deceptive simplicity".

== See also ==
- Hawks on Hawks
- Lynch on Lynch
- Trier on von Trier
