= Three Colours: Blue =

1993 film by Krzysztof Kieślowski

- French theatrical release poster
- French: Trois couleurs: Bleu
- Directed by: Krzysztof Kieślowski
- Written by: Krzysztof Piesiewicz; Krzysztof Kieślowski
- Produced by: Marin Karmitz
- Starring: Juliette Binoche; Benoît Régent; Hélène Vincent; Florence Pernel; Charlotte Véry; Emmanuelle Riva
- Cinematography: Sławomir Idziak
- Edited by: Jacques Witta
- Music by: Zbigniew Preisner
- Production companies: mk2 Productions SA; CED Productions; France 3 Cinéma; CAB Productions; TOR Studio Production; Canal+
- Distributed by: mk2 Diffusion (France); Rialto Film (Switzerland)
- Release dates: 8 September 1993 (France/Switzerland); 10 October 1993 (Warsaw)
- Running time: 98 minutes
- Countries: France; Poland; Switzerland
- Language: French
- Box office: $1.5 million

Three Colours: Blue (French: Trois couleurs: Bleu, Polish: Trzy kolory: Niebieski) is a 1993 psychological drama film co-written and directed by Polish filmmaker Krzysztof Kieślowski. It is the first instalment in the Three Colours trilogy, themed on the French Revolutionary ideals of liberty, equality and fraternity, followed by White and Red (both 1994). According to Kieślowski, the subject of the film is liberty, specifically emotional liberty, rather than its social or political meaning.

Set in Paris, the film follows a woman named Julie (Juliette Binoche) whose husband and daughter are killed in a car accident. Suddenly freed from her familial bonds, she tries to isolate herself and live in seclusion from her former ties. However, she discovers that she cannot escape human connections.

Upon its release, Blue received widespread critical acclaim and won several awards, including the Golden Lion and the Volpi Cup for Best Actress at the Venice Film Festival. It remains one of Kieślowski's most celebrated works. The male lead, Benoît Régent, died of an aneurysm at the age of 41 in October 1994, just one year after the film was released.

== Plot ==
Julie, the wife of famous French composer Patrice de Courcy, loses her husband and five-year-old daughter in an automobile accident but survives herself. While recovering in the hospital, Julie attempts suicide by taking an overdose of pills but is unable to swallow them. After being released from the hospital, Julie, who is thought to have helped write much of her husband's famous pieces, destroys what remains of his work. She contacts Olivier, a collaborator of her husband's who has always admired her, and sleeps with him before bidding him farewell. She empties the family home and puts it up for sale, moving into an apartment in Paris near Rue Mouffetard without informing anyone. Her only memento is a mobile of blue beads that is hinted to have belonged to her daughter.

Julie dissociates herself from her past life and distances herself from former friendships. She is no longer recognized by her mother, who has dementia. She reclaims and destroys the unfinished score for her late husband's last commissioned work, a piece celebrating European unity following the end of the Cold War. Excerpts of its music, however, continuously haunt her.

Despite her desire to live anonymously and alone, Julie is soon confronted by her past. A boy who witnessed the accident gives her a cross necklace found at the scene and asks her about her husband's last words, which turned out to be the punchline of an indelicate joke the husband was telling the family. Julie allows the boy to keep the necklace. She also reluctantly befriends Lucille, an exotic dancer who is having an affair with one of her neighbors and is despised by most residents of the apartment building. The two women provide emotional support for each other. At one point Julie discovers a few baby mice from a broken vase, who get abandoned by their mother. Julie has a strong emotional response, and ultimately borrows her neighbour's cat to get rid of the mice. She feels conflicted about the incident. While comforting Lucille at the Pigalle club where she works, Julie sees Olivier being interviewed on television, revealing that he kept a copy of the European piece and plans to finish it himself. Julie then sees a picture of Patrice with another woman in a romantic context.

Julie confronts Olivier about the European piece and asks him about the woman seen with Patrice. She tracks down Sandrine, a lawyer and Patrice's mistress, and discovers that she is pregnant with his child. Julie arranges for Sandrine to have the family home, not yet sold, and eventual recognition of his paternity for the child. Julie then returns to working on the piece with Olivier and finishes the final part. She calls Olivier, who refuses to put forth the piece as his own unless Julie is credited as well, to which Julie agrees. Julie then calls Olivier again and asks him if he still loves her; he says yes, and Julie proceeds to meet him.

Part of the completed Unity of Europe piece is played, which features a chorus and a solo soprano singing in Greek; the lyrics praise the divine love in Saint Paul's first letter to the Corinthians. Images are seen of all the people Julie's actions have affected. Julie cries before she begins to smile gradually.

== Cast ==
- Juliette Binoche as Julie de Courcy (née Vignon)
- Benoît Régent as Olivier Benôit
- Florence Pernel as Sandrine
- Charlotte Véry as Lucille
- Hélène Vincent as the journalist
- Philippe Volter as the real estate agent
- Emmanuelle Riva as Madame Vignon, Julie's mother
- Yann Trégouët as Antoine
- Isabelle Sadoyan as the servant
- Julie Delpy as Dominique (cameo)
- Zbigniew Zamachowski as Karol Karol (cameo)

== Production ==
Blue was an international co-production between the French companies CED Productions, Eurimages, France 3 Cinéma, and MK2 Productions, the Swiss company CAB Productions and the Polish company Studio Filmowe TOR. Principal photography began on 7 September 1992 and completed shooting in October 1992.

Like the other films in the trilogy, Blue makes frequent visual allusions to its title: numerous scenes are shot with blue filters or blue lighting, and many objects are blue. When Julie thinks about the musical score that she has tried to destroy, blue light overwhelms the screen. The film also includes several references to the colours of the tricolor that inspired Kieślowski's trilogy: several scenes are dominated by red light, and in one scene, children dressed in white bathing suits with red floaters jump into the blue swimming pool. Another scene features a link with the next film in the trilogy: while spotting the lawyer Sandrine, her husband's mistress, Julie is seen entering a courtroom where Karol, the Polish main character of White, is being divorced by Dominique, his estranged French wife.

== Analysis ==
The occasional fade-outs and fade-ins to Julie's character are used to represent an extremely subjective point of view. According to Kieślowski, "at a certain moment, time really does pass for Julie while at the same time, it stands still. Not only does her music come back to haunt her at a certain point, but time stands still for a moment".

Steven Woodward, in a detailed analysis of the film, drew attention to the unconventionality with which Kieślowski treats the title color in terms of the symbolism it expresses. Woodward noted that in the hospital scene, "given the association of blue light and funeral music, blue seems to convey the conventional sense of mourning and depression. However, the musical accompaniment highlights Julie's increasing struggle with the melody, which reminds her of her feelings of mourning; the symbolism of the color blue is associated with props such as a pool filled with water in which the heroine immerses herself to drown out the sound of her husband's compositions. However, the melody "still flows" and the feeling of mourning cannot be drowned out, so Julie gives in to it in the final sequence in blue colors.

Slavoj Žižek noted that the slogan "freedom, equality, fraternity" used in the Three Colors trilogy cannot be separated from the Christian theological virtues - faith, hope and love. According to Žižek, blue is associated with freedom and love; “freedom is true liberation only when supported by Love, the loving acceptance of others (In Blue, Julie goes from cold, abstract freedom to the real freedom of loving others)”. This Love, however, takes on a specific dimension, because the final "sexual act, during which Julia becomes enlightened, is staged as her own lonely fantasy, a dream-like event that does not actually involve contact with another person". The Slovenian psychoanalyst also stated that Julie had for a long time fetishized the idealized memory of her husband, which was disturbed by the news of marital infidelity. Blue, therefore, according to Žižek, "is not a film about mourning, but about creating conditions for mourning: only in the last shot of the film can Julie begin to work through mourning".

Emma Wilson analyzed Blue as a postmodern work of art, reflecting the content of Frederic Jameson's philosophical concept. According to Wilson, "the film questions the potential of its medium and shows how the evocative power of [...] images of suffering has been displaced".

== Reception ==
Three Colours: Blue received widespread acclaim from film critics. On the review aggregator website Rotten Tomatoes, the film holds an approval rating of 96% based on 56 reviews, with an average rating of 8.9/10. The website's critics consensus reads, "Three Colors: Blue contains some of director/co-writer Krzysztof Kieslowski's most visually arresting, emotionally resonant work – and boasts an outstanding performance from Juliette Binoche in the bargain." Metacritic, which uses a weighted average, assigned the film a score of 87 out of 100, based on 11 critics, indicating "universal acclaim".

Marjorie Baumgarten of The Austin Chronicle wrote, "Blue is a film that engages the mind, challenges the senses, implores a resolution, and tells, with aesthetic grace and formal elegance, a good story and a political allegory." Derek Malcolm of The Guardian wrote, "Blue remains an intense and moving tribute to the woman at its centre who, in coming back from tragedy, almost refuses, but ultimately accepts the only real love that's on offer."

=== Year-end lists ===
- 9th – James Berardinelli, ReelViews

=== Accolades ===
- Venice Film Festival, 1993: Golden Lion, Volpi Cup for Best Actress (Juliette Binoche), Golden Osella (Sławomir Idziak)
- César Award, 1993: Best Actress (Juliette Binoche), Best Sound, Best Film Editing
- Golden Globe Award: Best Actress - Motion Picture Drama (Juliette Binoche, nominated)
- Golden Globe Award: Best Foreign Language Film (nominated)
- Goya Awards: Best European Film
- Guldbagge Awards: Best Foreign Film (nominated)
- Chicago Film Festival, 1993 - Special Jury Prize
- Los Angeles Film Critics Association Awards, 1993 – Best Foreign Language Film (Runner up)

In 2007, the film was ranked at No. 29 by The Guardian's readers poll on the list of "40 greatest foreign films of all time". The film ranked 64th on BBC Culture's 2018 list of "The 100 greatest foreign-language films".
