= Dekalog =

1989 Film cycle directed by Krzysztof Kieślowski

- Blu-ray box set cover
- Written by: Krzysztof Kieślowski; Krzysztof Piesiewicz
- Directed by: Krzysztof Kieślowski
- Starring: Artur Barciś see below
- Music by: Zbigniew Preisner
- Country of origin: Poland
- Original language: Polish

Production
- Producer: Ryszard Chutkowski
- Cinematography: Wieslaw Zdort; Piotr Sobociński
- Editor: Ewa Smal
- Running time: 572 minutes
- Production companies: Zespol Filmowy "Tor"; Sender Freies Berlin; Telewizja Polska
- Budget: $100,000 (all parts)

Original release
- Release: 10 December 1989 – 29 June 1990

Dekalog (pronounced [dɛˈkalɔk], also known as Dekalog: The Ten Commandments and The Decalogue) is a 1989 Polish psychological drama television miniseries directed by Krzysztof Kieślowski and co-written by Kieślowski with Krzysztof Piesiewicz, with music by Zbigniew Preisner. It consists of ten one-hour films, inspired by the decalogue of the Ten Commandments. Each installment explores characters facing one or several moral or ethical dilemmas as they reside in an austere housing project in 1980s Poland.

Exhibited in its entirety at the 46th Venice International Film Festival, the series, Kieślowski's most acclaimed work, was said in 2002 to be "the best dramatic work ever done specifically for television" and has won numerous international awards, though it did not receive wide release outside Europe until the late 1990s. It is one of fifteen films listed in the category "Values" on the Vatican film list. In 1991, filmmaker Stanley Kubrick wrote an admiring foreword to the published screenplay.

== Episodes ==
Episode	Cast	Cinematography
Dekalog: One	Henryk Baranowski; Wojciech Klata; Maja Komorowska	Wiesław Zdort
Dekalog: Two	Krystyna Janda; Aleksander Bardini; Olgierd Łukaszewicz	Edward Klosiński
Dekalog: Three	Daniel Olbrychski; Maria Pakulnis; Joanna Szczepkowska	Piotr Sobociński
Dekalog: Four	Adrianna Biedrzyńska; Janusz Gajos; Adam Hanuszkiewicz	Krzysztof Pakulski
Dekalog: Five	Mirosław Baka; Jan Tesarz; Krzysztof Globisz	Sławomir Idziak
Dekalog: Six	Olaf Lubaszenko; Grażyna Szapołowska Stefania Iwińska	Witold Adamek
Dekalog: Seven	Anna Polony; Maja Barełkowska; Bogusław Linda	Dariusz Kuc
Dekalog: Eight	Teresa Marczewska; Maria Kościałkowska; Bronisław Pawlik	Andrzej J. Jaroszewicz
Dekalog: Nine	Ewa Błaszczyk; Piotr Machalica; Jan Jankowski	Piotr Sobociński
Dekalog: Ten	Jerzy Stuhr; Zbigniew Zamachowski; Henryk Bista	Jacek Bławut

== Production ==
The series was conceived when screenwriter Krzysztof Piesiewicz, who had seen a 15th-century artwork illustrating the Commandments in scenes from that time period, suggested the idea of a modern equivalent. Filmmaker Krzysztof Kieślowski was interested in the philosophical challenge, and also wanted to use the series as a portrait of the hardships of Polish society, while deliberately avoiding the political issues he had depicted in earlier films. He originally meant to hire ten different directors, but decided to direct the films himself. He used a different cinematographer for each episode except III and IX, in both of which Piotr Sobociński was director of photography.

The large cast includes both famous and unknown actors, many of whom Kieślowski also used in his other films. Typically for Kieślowski, the tone of most of the films is melancholic, except for the final one, which is a black comedy, featuring two of the same actors, Jerzy Stuhr and Zbigniew Zamachowski, as in Three Colors: White.

== Themes ==
The ten films are titled simply by number, e.g. Dekalog: One. According to film critic Roger Ebert's introduction to the DVD set, Kieślowski said that the films did not correspond exactly to the commandments, and never used their names himself. Though each film is independent, most of them share the same setting in Warsaw, and some of the characters are acquainted with each other. Each short film explores characters facing one or several moral or ethical dilemmas as they live in a large housing project in 1980s Poland. The themes can be interpreted in many different ways; however, each film has its own literality:

Commandment (Roman Catholic Enumeration)	Ideal	Kieślowskian Theme
1. I am the Lord thy God... thou shalt not have other gods before me. Thou shalt not make unto thee any graven image... Thou shalt not bow down thyself to them, nor serve them.	The sanctity of God and worship	Idolisation of science
2. Thou shalt not take the name of the Lord thy God in vain.	The sanctity of speech	Names as fundamental to identity and moral choice; the importance of one's word in human life.
3. Remember the Sabbath day, to keep it holy.	The sanctity of time	Time designations (holidays, day/night etc.) as repositories of meaning
4. Honor thy father and thy mother.	The sanctity of authority	Family and social relationship as regulators of identity
5. Thou shalt not kill.	The sanctity of life	Murder and punishment
6. Thou shalt not commit adultery.	The sanctity of love	The nature and relation of love and passion
7. Thou shalt not steal.	The sanctity of dominion	Possession as human need and temptation
8. Thou shalt not bear false witness against thy neighbor.	The sanctity of truth	The difficulties of truth amid desperate evil
9. Thou shalt not covet thy neighbor's wife.	The sanctity of emotional contentment	Sex, jealousy, and fidelity
10. Thou shalt not covet thy neighbor's goods.	The sanctity of material contentment	Greed and relationships

=== Recurring character of Artur Barciś ===
A nameless character played by Polish actor Artur Barciś appears in all but episode 10. He observes the main characters at key moments, and never intervenes.

Episode	Character played by Artur Barciś
Dekalog: One	A homeless man sitting by a fire near the lake
Dekalog: Two	A laboratory assistant/orderly in the hospital
Dekalog: Three	A tram driver
Dekalog: Four	A man rowing a boat and later seen carrying the boat
Dekalog: Five	A construction worker holding a measuring pole and then as a different construction worker carrying a ladder
Dekalog: Six	A man carrying bags of groceries
Dekalog: Seven	Does not appear (Barciś was meant to be a man at the railway station, but Kieślowski experienced technical difficulties that prevented the character's inclusion in this episode)
Dekalog: Eight	A student at the university
Dekalog: Nine	A man riding a bicycle
Dekalog: Ten	Does not appear

=== Milk ===
Milk is a recurring element in the following seven episodes:

Episode	Occurrence of milk in The Decalogue
Dekalog: One	The milk is sour.
Dekalog: Two	The doctor goes to buy milk.
Dekalog: Four	Michał leaves the house to buy milk.
Dekalog: Six	Tomek becomes a milkman. Magda spills milk on the table.
Dekalog: Seven	Ewa tries to breastfeed Ania without any milk. Wojtek tells Majka that Ania needs a home with milk.
Dekalog: Eight	There is an unopened bottle of milk on the table while Zofia and Elżbieta are having dinner.
Dekalog: Nine	Roman is pouring milk while watching a child play.

== Reception ==
Metacritic, which uses a weighted average, assigned the film a score of 100 out of 100, based on 13 critics, indicating "universal acclaim". It won the 1991 BAFTA TV Award for Best International Programme and the Bodil Award for Best European Film. The film also won the Best Foreign Film award from French Syndicate of Cinema Critics.

The series was praised by renowned film critics including Roger Ebert and Robert Fulford, as well as influential filmmaker Stanley Kubrick.

In the 2002 Sight & Sound poll to determine the greatest films of all time, Dekalog and A Short Film About Killing received votes from four critics and three directors, including Ebert, New Yorker critic David Denby, and director Mira Nair. Additionally, in the Sight & Sound poll held the same year to determine the top 10 films of the previous 25 years, Kieslowski was named #2 on the list of Top Directors, with votes for his films being split between Dekalog, Three Colors Red/Blue, and The Double Life of Veronique. In the 2012 polls Dekalog received six votes from critics including Kenneth Turan and one vote from director Milcho Manchevski as the Greatest Film of All Time.

The Village Voice ranked The Decalogue at No. 112 in its Top 250 "Best Films of the Century" list in 1999, based on a poll of critics. In January 2002, the film was listed among the Top 100 "Essential Films" of all time by the National Society of Film Critics. The film ranked #36 in Empire magazine's "The 100 Best Films of World Cinema" in 2010.

In a 2025 Criterion Closet Video, Director Brady Corbet called The Decalogue "[M]aybe the greatest achievement in the history of cinema."

== Longer feature films ==
Kieślowski expanded Five and Six into longer feature films (A Short Film About Killing and A Short Film About Love), using the same cast and changing the stories slightly. This was part of a contractual obligation with the producers, since feature films were easier to distribute outside Poland. In 2000, the series was released on five DVDs, each containing two parts of about 2 hours.
