= Artur Barciś =

Polish actor (born 1956)

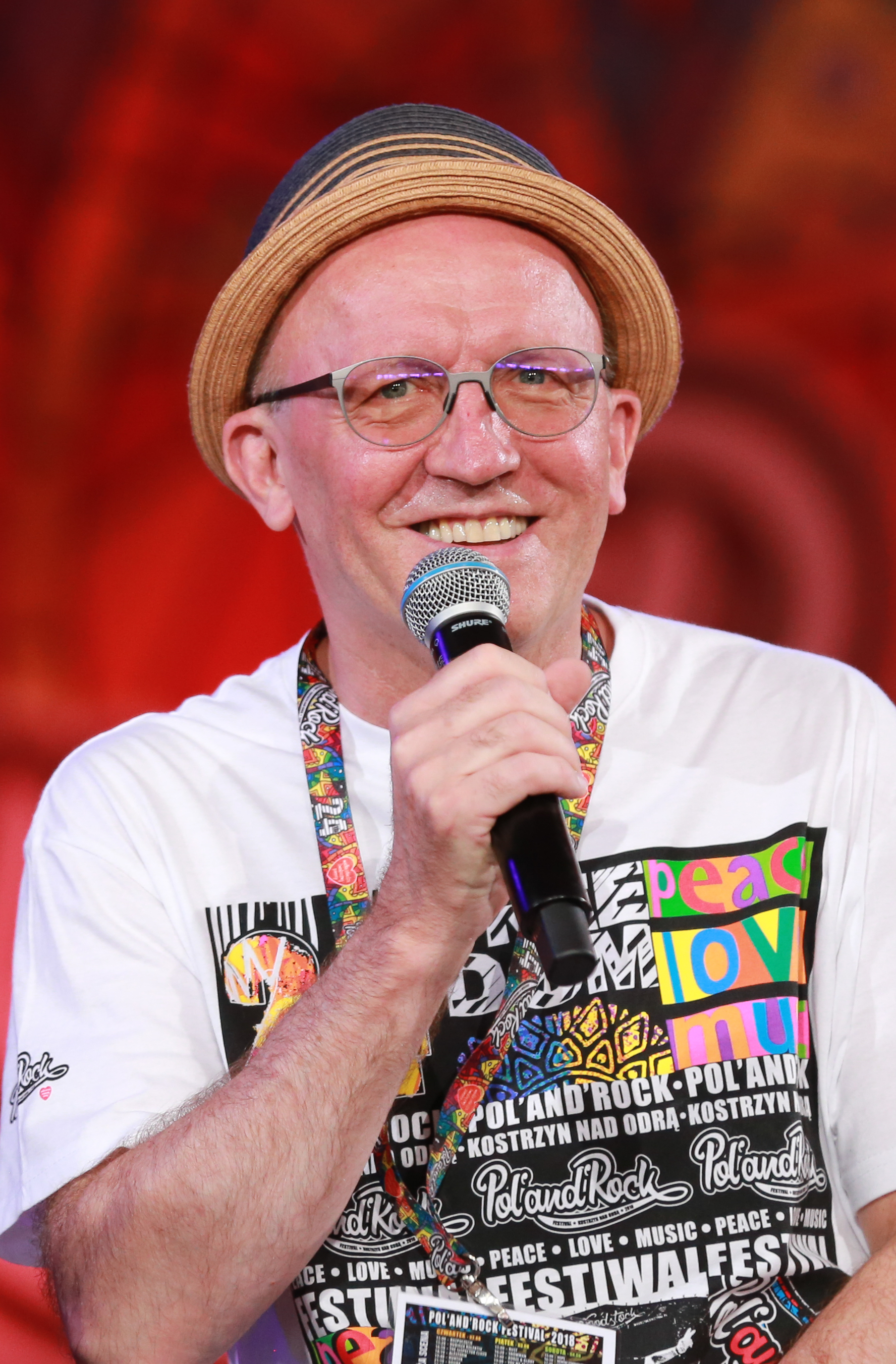
- Barciś at Pol'and'Rock Festival 2018
- Born: 12 August 1956 (age 70); Kokawa, People's Republic of Poland
- Education: Łódź Film School
- Occupations: Actor; director
- Years active: 1978–present

Signature
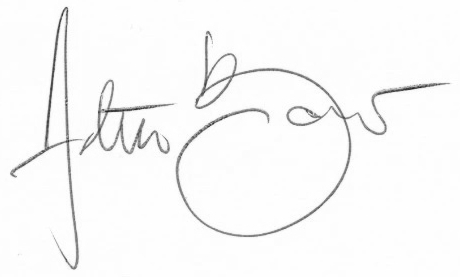

Artur Barciś ([ˈartur ˈbarʲʨ̑ĩɕ]; born 12 August 1956) is a Polish actor and film director. His television appearances include Krzysztof Kieślowski's anthology series Dekalog (1989), the soap opera Aby do świtu... (1992), and Kurierzy ("Couriers"). From 2006 to 2016 he played the lovably neurotic Arkadiusz Czerepach in the comedy series Ranczo ("The Ranch").

In 2011, he and The Ranch co-star Cezary Żak starred in Dziwna para, a Polish adaptation of Neil Simon's Broadway theatre play The Odd Couple.

== Biography ==
Graduated from the High School in Rudniki and the PWSFTviT in Lodz in 1979. He was an actor at the Targówek Theater (1979–1981) and the National Theater (1982–1984). Since 1984 he has been an actor at the Ateneum Theater in Warsaw. He gained popularity for his performances in the show Pankracy's Window, intended for young audiences. In the late 1990s, he gained popularity among TV viewers thanks to one of the leading roles in the TV series Miodowe lata, where he played the role of Tadeusz Norek. He has gained recognition among viewers by playing both comedic and dramatic roles.

In 2010, he was a participant in the eleventh edition of the TVN entertainment program Dancing with the Stars. During the seventh episode, he withdrew from the competition due to a leg injury.

== Personal life ==
His wife is Beata Dorota Barciś (born August 8, 1962), a film editor. They have a son Franciszek (born 1989), who played the role of young Adasio Miauczyński in Marek Koterski's Nic śmieszny (1995) and a small role in the TV series Honey Years. In September 2021, he announced that he had apostasized.

He was a member of the honorary support committee of Bronisław Komorowski before the 2010 fast-track presidential election and before the 2015 Polish presidential election. He supports the Raków Częstochowa soccer club.

== Selected filmography ==
=== Films ===
- 1981: The Quack as Wasylko
- 1981: Man of Iron as a student
- 1982: Odlot as Rafał Michalski
- 1982: "Znachor" as Wasylko
- 1983: Wierna rzeka as an insurrectionist
- 1984: Siedem życzeń as Bolesław Luba
- 1984: Przemytnicy as "Szczur"
- 1984: Pan na Żuławach as Stefan Leszczak
- 1984: Lato leśnych ludzi as motorcycle rider „Piwko”
- 1984: Bez końca as Dariusz Stach
- 1985: Zaproszenie as Janek Górski
- 1985: Sam pośród swoich as Pielarz
- 1987: Opowiadanie wariackie as a sick man
- 1987: A Short Film About Killing as a worker
- 1987: Bez grzechu as the director of the post office
- 1988: A Short Film About Love as a man with a suitcase
- 1988: Dekalog: One as a man in the sheepskin
- 1988: Dekalog: Two as a laboratory assistant
- 1988: Dekalog: Three as a tram driver
- 1988: Dekalog: Four as a canoeist
- 1988: Dekalog: Five as a worker
- 1988: Dekalog: Six as a man with a suitcase
- 1988: Dekalog: Seven as a man at the railway station
- 1988: Dekalog: Eight as a university student
- 1988: Dekalog: Nine as bicycle rider
- 1988: Chichot Pana Boga as sewerman
- 1989: Virtuti as Jehorek
- 1989: Urodzony po raz trzeci as volksdeutsch Józef Golonka
- 1989: Szklany dom as MO lieutenant
- 1989: Stan posiadania as Julia's neighbour
- 1989: Rififi po sześćdziesiątce as patient Rydz
- 1989: Ostatni prom as Rysiek
- 1990: Życie za życie. Maksymilian Kolbe as brother Anzelm
- 1990: Escape from the 'Liberty' Cinema as Krzysio
- 1990: Kramarz as Chruścik's assistant
- 1990: Europa Europa as a Soviet soldier captured by the Germans
- 1991: Rozmowy kontrolowane as a policeman trying to arrest Ryszard Ochódzki
- 1991: Powodzenia, żołnierzyku as Renkel
- 1992: Kawalerskie życie na obczyźnie as Stefan
- 1993: Straszny sen Dzidziusia Górkiewicza as Stryjek
- 1995: Wielki Tydzień as Zaleski
- 1995: Colonel Kwiatkowski as Captain Malec
- 1996: Dzień wielkiej ryby as railwayman
- 1997: Kroniki domowe as Stanisław
- 1997: Historie miłosne as lawyer
- 2000: Sen o kanapce z żółtym serem
- 2001: Córa marnotrawna as Maciuś Cichy
- 2002: Superprodukcja as "the metaphoric person"
- 2007: Braciszek as Piotr Kosiba
- 2009: Galerianki as Alicja's father
- 2017: The Art of Loving: The Story of Michalina Wisłocka as Bolesław
- 2017: Dwie korony as priest chancellor
- 2019: Czadowy film as himself
- 2023: Forgotten Love as butler Józef

=== TV series ===
- 1986: Tulipan as Zbyszek (Episode 5 and 6)
- 1991: Pogranicze w ogniu as "Kuna" (Episode 17 and 24)
- 1992: Aby do świtu... as itchyologist Nowacki (Episode 13)
- 1993: Żywot człowieka rozbrojonego (Episode 2 and 3)
- 1998–2003: Miodowe lata as Tadeusz Norek
- 1999: Świat według Kiepskich as Tadeusz Norek from Miodowe lata
- 2004: Całkiem nowe lata miodowe as Tadeusz Norek
- 2004: Na dobre i na złe as Alfred Kwiatkowski (Episode 173)
- 2004: Kryminalni as Mierzwa (Episode 10)
- 2006–2009: The Ranch as Arkadiusz Czerepach
- 2007: Halo Hans! as Mosze vel von Thorgelsund
- 2008: Pitbull as Zenon Lebioda (Episode 20)
- 2011–2016: The Ranch as Arkadiusz Czerepach
- 2012–2018: M jak miłość as Jerzy Kolęda
- 2017: The Chairman's Ear as former Health Minister Konstanty (Episode 27 and 33)
- 2024: Forst
