= Parallel Tales =

2026 French film by Asghar Farhadi

- French release poster
- French: Histoires parallèles
- Directed by: Asghar Farhadi
- Screenplay by: Asghar Farhadi; Saeed Farhadi
- Based on: Dekalog: Six by Krzysztof Kieślowski and Krzysztof Piesiewicz
- Produced by: Gaëtan David; Asghar Farhadi; David Levine; André Logie; Alexandre Mallet-Guy; Andrea Occhipinti
- Starring: Isabelle Huppert; Virginie Efira; Vincent Cassel; Pierre Niney; Adam Bessa; Catherine Deneuve; India Hair
- Cinematography: Guillaume Deffontaines
- Edited by: Hayedeh Safiyari
- Music by: Zbigniew Preisner
- Production companies: Anonymous Content; La Compagnie Cinématographique; Lucky Red; Memento Films Production; Panache Productions
- Distributed by: Memento Films (France)
- Release dates: 14 May 2026 (Cannes); 14 May 2026 (France)
- Running time: 140 minutes
- Countries: France; United States; Italy; Belgium
- Language: French
- Budget: €11 million
- Box office: $1.6 million

Parallel Tales (French: Histoires parallèles) is a 2026 French-language drama film produced and directed by Asghar Farhadi, co-written with Saeed Farhadi, and loosely based on Krzysztof Kieślowski's Dekalog: Six. Starring an ensemble cast that includes Isabelle Huppert, Virginie Efira, Vincent Cassel, Pierre Niney and Adam Bessa, it follows Sylvie (Huppert), a famous author seeking inspiration by observing neighbors across the street, who hires the mysterious Adam (Bessa) as assistant who ends up impacting those neighbors.

The film had its world premiere in the main competition of the 2026 Cannes Film Festival on 14 May, and was theatrically released in France on the same day by Memento Films. It received mostly negative reviews from critics.

== Cast ==
- Isabelle Huppert as Sylvie
- Virginie Efira as Anna / Nita
- Vincent Cassel as Pierre / Nicolas
- Pierre Niney as Christophe / Théo
- Adam Bessa as Adam
- Catherine Deneuve as Céline, the editor
- India Hair

== Production ==
=== Development ===
In April 2025, it was announced Farhadi would direct his 10th feature film, and his second French language production in Paris in the fall, starring Isabelle Huppert, Virginie Efira, Vincent Cassel, Pierre Niney, Adam Bessa, and Catherine Deneuve joining the cast.

Cassel revealed in an interview with the newspaper La Tribune, that the film would follow the aftermath of the November 2015 Paris attacks. In early 2026, Polish executive producer Maciej Musiał confirmed that the film will be loosely based on Krzysztof Kieślowski's Dekalog: Six, while adaptations for the series other nine episodes were in different stages of production. In April, alongside the trailer, the film's official poster confirmed the adaptation.

A co-production involving France, the United States, Belgium and Italy. Co-produced by the French company Memento Films Production and the US-based Anonymous Content. It was also financed by the French Centre national du cinéma et de l'image animée (CNC).

=== Filming ===
Principal photography began on 8 September 2025, shooting on location in Paris, and wrapped by early December. Guillaume Deffontaines was the director of photography. Farhadi recurrent collaborator Iranian editor Hayedeh Safiyari will handle the editing.

== Release ==
It had world premiere at the main competition of the 2026 Cannes Film Festival on 14 May, followed by its theatrical release in France on the same day.

== Reception ==
=== Box office ===
It grossed $1.6 million at the French box office, including a $1 million opening week between 13-17 May 2026.

=== Critical response ===
On the review aggregator website Rotten Tomatoes, 19% of 31 critics' reviews are positive, with an average rating of 4.5/10. Metacritic, which uses a weighted average, assigned the film a score of 41 out of 100, based on 17 critics, indicating "mixed or average" reviews.

In a 0.5/4 rating, Éric Neuhoff of Le Figaro declared Parallel Tales "boring and conventional", looking like a French film.
