= Dekalog: Eight =

1989 Film directed by Krzysztof Kieślowski

- Directed by: Krzysztof Kieślowski
- Written by: Krzysztof Kieślowski; Krzysztof Piesiewicz
- Produced by: Ryszard Chutkovski
- Starring: Teresa Marczewska; Maria Kościałkowska
- Cinematography: Andrzej J. Jaroszewicz
- Edited by: Ewa Smal
- Music by: Zbigniew Preisner
- Distributed by: Polish Television
- Release date: September 1989 (Venice)
- Running time: 55 minutes
- Country: Poland
- Language: Polish
- Budget: $10,000

Dekalog: Eight (Polish: Dekalog, osiem) is the eighth part of Dekalog, the drama series of films directed by Polish director Krzysztof Kieślowski for television, connected to the eighth imperative of the Ten Commandments - "Thou shalt not bear false witness against thy neighbor".

A Holocaust survivor (Teresa Marczewska) confronts an ethics professor (Maria Kościałkowska) who once refused to help her on the basis of this commandment.

The ten-part Dekalog series was exhibited in its entirety at the 46th Venice International Film Festival in September 1989, in the Special Events section. Dekalog: Seven premiered on Polish Television on 22 June 1990.

== Plot ==
Warsaw, Poland, circa 1985. Zofia (Maria Koscialkowska) is an elderly but sporty university professor who is friends with stamp-collecting neighbour Czesław "Root" Janicki. Elżbieta (Teresa Marczewska), a woman in her forties, who is from New York but speaks excellent Polish and is clearly of Polish descent, is visiting the University of Warsaw. She goes to Zofia's ethics lecture. Elżbieta and Zofia are professional acquaintances from the USA, Elżbieta having translated Zofia's works, and the latter is glad to introduce her to the students.

Zofia's lecture consists of the students posing ethical problems to be discussed in class. One of the students poses the case of a doctor and a woman who needs to have an abortion, the very dilemma that is the subject of Dekalog: Two. Elżbieta then gives an example of a real-life tale set in 1943, during World War II: a 6-year-old Jewish girl whose parents were sent to the ghetto is promised to get help from some willing Catholic family, yet the woman from the family refuses to provide the help and sends the girl away just before curfew.

Zofia figures out that Elżbieta herself was the small girl left to an uncertain fate, and that it was she, Zofia, who refused to help her. Her initial explanation that, being Catholics, they could not lie about Elżbieta's fake baptism is not good enough. Zofia asks Elżbieta to dinner, but instead drives her to the house where the scene took place in 1943. Back at Zofia's apartment, she expresses her deep regret and explains the real reason she refused her help: Zofia's husband was an officer of the Polish resistance and there were reports (that later turned out to be false) that the foster family were working for the Gestapo. This does not take away the fact that Zofia went along with abandoning 6-year-old Elżbieta to near-certain death. Janicki, the neighbour, enters and proudly shows Zofia his series of 1931 German stamps that he has recently acquired.

Zofia has had difficulties, over the years, living with what she did and did not do during the war. Elżbieta asks to be taken to the family that had offered to help her, but when she gets there, the man, a tailor, refuses to speak about the war. Zofia tells her that he suffered a lot during and after the war and that is why he will not say anything.

The story was based on an experience of the filmmakers' mutual friend, the journalist Hanna Krall.

== Cast ==
- Maria Koscialkowska - Zofia
- Teresa Marczewska - Elżbieta
- Artur Barciś - young man
- Tadeusz Łomnicki - tailor
- Bronislaw Pawlik - philatelist, Zofia's neighbour

Actors from other episodes playing different roles:

- Marian Opania, Wojciech Asinski, Marek Kepinski, Janusz Mond, Krzysztof Rojek, Wiktor Sanejko, Ewa Skibinska, Hanna Szcerkowska, Anna Zagorska
