= Dekalog: Nine =

1989 Film directed by Krzysztof Kieślowski

- Directed by: Krzysztof Kieślowski
- Written by: Krzysztof Kieślowski; Krzysztof Piesiewicz
- Produced by: Ryszard Chutkovski
- Starring: Ewa Błaszczyk; Piotr Machalica
- Cinematography: Piotr Sobocinski
- Edited by: Ewa Smal
- Music by: Zbigniew Preisner
- Release date: September 1989 (Venice)
- Running time: 58 minutes
- Country: Poland
- Language: Polish
- Budget: $10,000

Dekalog: Nine (Polish: Dekalog, dziewięć) is the ninth part of Dekalog, the drama series of films directed by Polish director Krzysztof Kieślowski for television, connected to the ninth imperative of the Ten Commandments: "thou shalt not covet thy neighbour's wife".

A man who has become impotent (Piotr Machalica) discovers that his wife (Ewa Błaszczyk) has a lover. A minor character in this film, a young singer with a heart condition, inspired Kieślowski's and Piesiewicz's next film, The Double Life of Véronique.

The ten-part Dekalog series was exhibited in its entirety at the 46th Venice International Film Festival in September 1989, in the Special Events section. Dekalog: Seven premiered on Polish Television on 29 June 1990.

== Plot ==
Dr. Roman Nycz (Piotr Machalica) has been diagnosed with impotence. His friend and colleague confirms the prognosis, suggesting that he should divorce his attractive young wife, Hanka (Ewa Błaszczyk), a stewardess for KLM. After discussing the diagnosis, it becomes clear that the couple love each other and do not want to lose each other. Hanka offers that there are more important things in a relationship between two people than sex and that she will manage to live without it. Roman, although guarded and hurt, says that he would not begrudge her decision to find another lover if she does not already have one. She halfheartedly refuses and asks that they refrain from discussing the situation at length.

Roman is attracted to a young singer who must undergo heart surgery. Earlier that morning he notices a young man around his building who at the sight of him walks away and disappears. He becomes suspicious and bugs his own phone to eavesdrop on Hanka. He finds out that she is indeed sleeping with the young man, Mariusz (Jan Jankowski), a student with whom she has a purely physical relationship. Their trysts happen at her mother's empty house. One day, Hanka forgets some items that her mother wanted from her house and asks Roman to retrieve them for her; while in the house he snoops around and finds a notebook belonging to Mariusz that he had earlier found in his car. He makes a copy of Hanka's key and clandestinely listens to his wife's affair from the stairwell of her mother's house.

Amid escalating tension and guilt at home, Hanka resolves to end her relationship with Mariusz and meets him at her mother's house to break things off. After Mariusz leaves, she discovers Roman hidden in the closet and learns that he saw everything and has been fully aware of her infidelity. Seeing that he is more shaken and hurt than she imagined, Hanka tries to console Roman and agrees that they should discuss their issues at length. The doorbell rings; Mariusz has returned to the house. He says that he loves Hanka and would marry her if she were to divorce Roman. Saying nothing, Hanka simply closes the door on Mariusz. Hanka sees how much she has hurt Roman. She asks him to hold her, but Roman says that he cannot. Hanka is now more resolute about being faithful and seeking a child for adoption (initially they had half-heartedly discussed adoption as a way to make their intimacy problems more manageable.)

At Roman's suggestion that the couple take a break, Hanka goes on a skiing trip alone to Zakopane, unaware that Mariusz has followed her there. Roman spots Mariusz loading his skiing gear onto his car and calls his house posing as a classmate of Mariusz. His mother confirms that Mariusz has left for a skiing trip to Zakopane. Jumping to the conclusion that Hanka and Mariusz must be continuing their affair, Roman leaves a note for Hanka at his flat. When Hanka realizes that Mariusz has followed her, she rushes to return to Warsaw. Meanwhile, Roman attempts suicide by riding his bicycle off of a bridge. Hanka returns to the flat and is distraught upon finding Roman's suicide note. Roman, despite sustaining head injuries of ambiguous severity and being placed into a body cast, is eventually told by hospital staff that Hanka had called the hospital earlier in the day to say that she would be returning from Zakopane immediately. After asking a nurse to dial his apartment, Roman and Hanka are reunited over the telephone.

== Cast ==
- Ewa Błaszczyk - Hanka
- Piotr Machalica - Roman
- Artur Barciś - man on the bicycle
- Jan Jankowski - Mariusz
- Jolanta Pietek-Górecka - Ola
- Katarzyna Piwowarczyk - Ania
- Jerzy Trela - Mikołaj

Actors from other episodes playing different roles:

- Renata Berger, Malgorzata Boratynska, Jolanta Cichon, Janusz Cywinski, Slawomir Kwiatkowski, Dariusz Przychoda
