= From a Night Porter's Point of View =

- The "night porter"
- Directed by: Krzysztof Kieślowski
- Written by: Krzysztof Kieślowski
- Starring: Marian Osuch
- Cinematography: Witold Stok
- Edited by: Lidia Zonn
- Music by: Wojciech Kilar
- Release date: 1977
- Running time: 17 minutes
- Country: Poland
- Language: Polish

From a Night Porter's Point of View (Polish: Z punktu widzenia nocnego portiera) is a 1977 documentary film by Polish filmmaker Krzysztof Kieślowski. It won the Grand Prix at the nineteenth Kraków Film Festival in 1979. The 17-minute film consists of an interview with Marian Osuch, a minor security official.

Most of the footage is of Osuch performing the various duties of his job, while he narrates his opinions on various subjects. Osuch talks mostly about his position, how he personally enjoys enforcing various bureaucratic rules, arresting petty offenders, and confiscating fishing rods. He also details his support for the government and capital punishment, saying that criticism of the government should be silenced, and that criminals should be hanged in public.

English-subtitled versions of the film are included on Polskie Wydawnictwo Audiowizualne's double-disc survey of Kieślowski's non-fiction work Polish School of the Documentary: Krzysztof Kieślowski (Region 0 PAL) and as an extra on the Artificial Eye DVD of Kieślowski's A Short Film About Killing (Region 2 PAL).

A sequel to the film titled Views of a Retired Night Porter, starring the same night porter, Marian Osuch, was directed by Andreas Horvath in 2006.
