= Krystyna Janda =

Polish actress (born 1952)

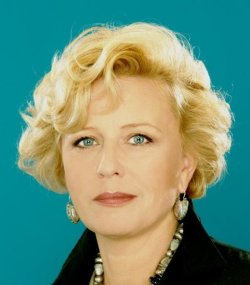
- Krystyna Janda
- Born: 18 December 1952 (age 73); Starachowice, Poland
- Education: National Academy of Dramatic Art in Warsaw
- Occupation: Actress
- Years active: 1976–present
- Spouses: Andrzej Seweryn (m. 1974–1979) Edward Kłosiński (m. 1981; died 2008)
- Awards: Best Actress Award at the Cannes Film Festival (1990); Best Actress Award at the Montreal World Film Festival (1987); Zbigniew Cybulski Award (1978)
- Honours: Commander's Cross with Star of Order of Polonia Restituta Officer's Cross of Order of Polonia Restituta Gold Cross of Merit (Poland) Gold Medal for Merit to Culture – Gloria Artis Decoration of Honor Meritorious for Polish Culture Ordre des Arts et des Lettres Chevalier
- Website: https://krystynajanda.pl

Krystyna Jolanta Janda (Polish: [krɨˈstɨ.na ˈjan.da]; born 18 December 1952) is a Polish film and theatre actress, director, and singer. She is best known internationally for playing leading roles in several films by Polish film director Andrzej Wajda, including Man of Marble (Człowiek z marmuru, 1976) and Man of Iron (Człowiek z żelaza, 1981). She is widely considered one of the most popular and successful Polish actresses of her generation and an icon of Polish cinema.

In 1981, she played in the Academy Award-winning movie Mephisto. In 1982, she played the lead character in Ryszard Bugajski's film Przesłuchanie (Interrogation), which first premiered seven years later in 1989, following the collapse of communism. Despite the film's late release, she garnered international acclaim for her performance, including winning Best Actress at the Cannes Film Festival and Polish Film Festival in 1990. Janda is also known for her leading role in the second episode of Krzysztof Kieślowski's series Dekalog.

Her accolades and honours also include the Zbigniew Cybulski Award (1978), Gold Cross of Merit (1989), Gloria Artis Gold Medal for Merit to Culture (2005), Commander's Cross with Star of the Order of Polonia Restituta (2011), Special Jury Award for Acting at the Sundance Film Festival (2019), and Polish Film Award for Lifetime Achievement (2026).

Because of her prominent role in Polish culture, has been described as a "legend of Polish cinema and theatre" and a "national treasure".

== Life and work ==
She was born on 18 December 1952 in Starachowice, Polish People's Republic. She graduated from the Wojciech Gerson State High School of Fine Arts in Warsaw (Polish: Zespół Państwowych Szkół Plastycznych im. Wojciecha Gersona w Warszawie), and in 1975 she graduated from the State Dramatic Arts College in Warsaw (currently the Aleksander Zelwerowicz State Theatre Academy). She made her acting debut in 1974 playing the role of Maria Kulygina in Anton Chekhov's play Three Sisters, directed by Aleksander Bardini and broadcast in a Television Theatre production. In the same year, she played the role of Mannequin 34 in a street grotesque play The Ball of Mannequins by Polish futurist poet Bruno Jasieński, directed by Janusz Warmiński. In 1976, she played in the role of Dorian Gray based on Oscar Wilde's The Picture of Dorian Gray, adapted by John Osborne and directed by Andrzej Łapicki in Warsaw's "Little Theatre". In the years 1976–1987 she worked as an actress in the Ateneum Theatre in Warsaw.

She made her film debut in 1973, when she starred in the historical-based TV series Czarne chmury ("Black Clouds"), but a turning point in her acting career came with the role of Agnieszka in Andrzej Wajda's Man of Marble (1976). She became known for portraying strong and determined female characters with complex personalities in her film roles. Apart from Man of Marble, her most memorable roles include characters in critically acclaimed films like Man of Iron, Interrogation and My Mom's Lovers.

She also embarked on a career as a singer and made her debut in 1977 during the 15th National Festival of Polish Song in Opole, where she sang the song Guma do żucia ("The Chewing Gum") with lyrics written by Marek Grechuta.

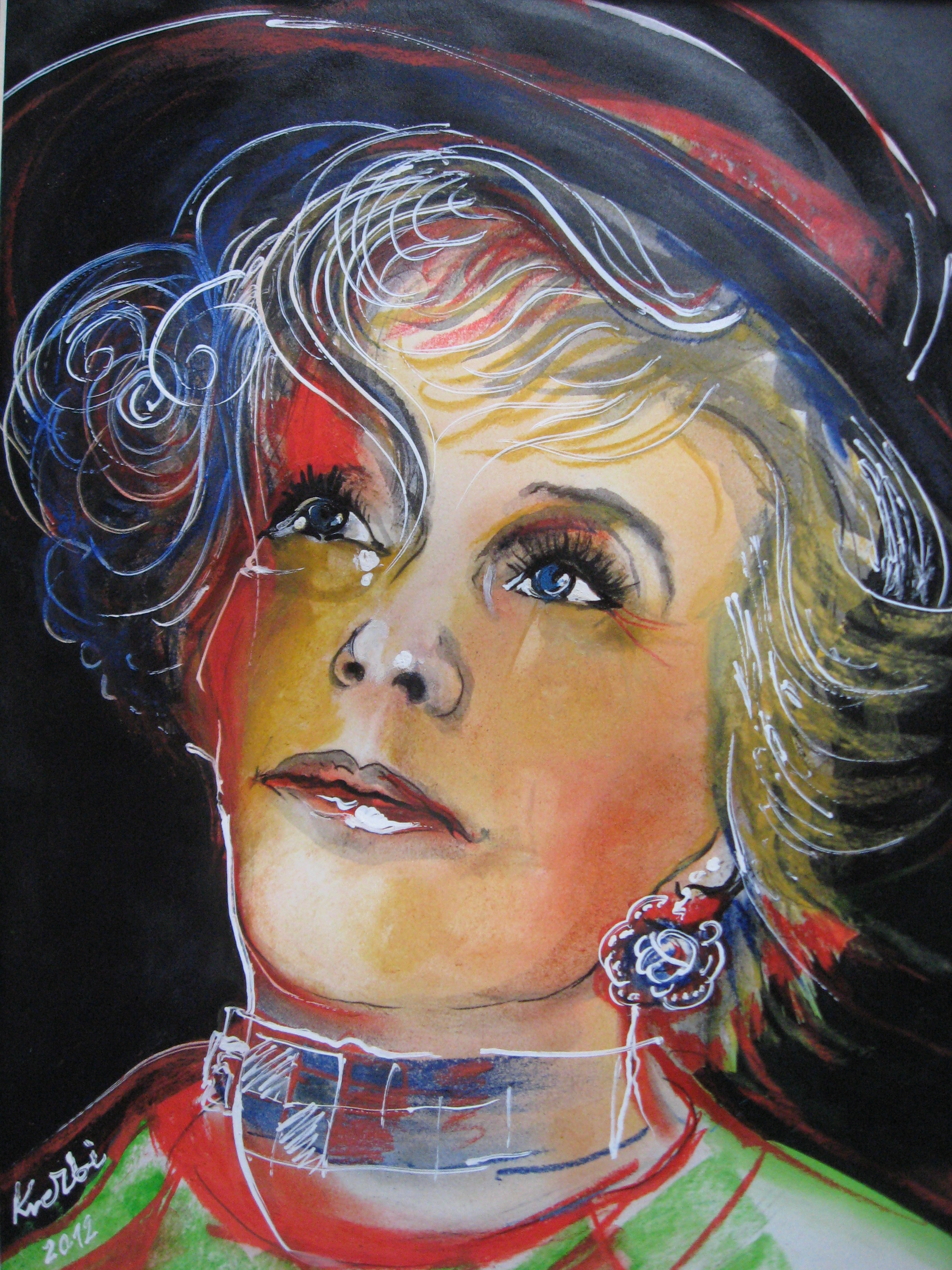
Krystyna Janda by artist Zbigniew Kresowaty

In the 1980s she appeared in numerous films and stage productions and started working as a film and theatre director herself. In 1995 she directed the film Pestka based on a novel by Anka Kowalska. During her professional career she has played over 60 theatre roles in virtually all the major theatre genres as well as appeared in around 100 films. Her role in Euripides's Medea is considered among her most successful ones. She is particularly known for her artistic collaboration with renowned Academy Award-winning filmmaker Andrzej Wajda. She starred in six of his films altogether: Man of Marble (1976), Man of Iron (1981), Without Anesthesia (1978), The Orchestra Conductor (1980), Solidarity, Solidarity... Man of Hope (2005), and Sweet Rush (2009).

In 1993, she was a member of the jury at the 43rd Berlin International Film Festival.

Throughout her career, she has received numerous prestigious awards, such as Best Actress at the 1990 Cannes Film Festival, Silver Shell for Best Actress at the San Sebastian Film Festival for her role in Waldemar Krzystek's film Zwolnienie z życia, Best Actress Award at the 1987 Montreal World Film Festival for the role in Helma Sanders-Brahms's Laputa, Best Actress Award at the Belgrade Film Festival for Interrogation, the Zbigniew Cybulski Award for best young Polish actress, as well as 4 Golden Duck Awards. She is widely regarded as one of the greatest actresses in the history of Polish cinema and was selected in a 1998 Polityka magazine survey among the greatest actresses of the 20th century.

In 2000, she embarked on one of the biggest tours in the history of Polish theatre, entitled Sto twarzy Krystyny Jandy (One Hundred Faces of Krystyna Janda). She performed in 48 different plays in Poland's eight largest cities within the space of two months.

In 2005, she established her own private Polonia Theater in Warsaw. She is also the founder and head of the Krystyna Janda Cultural Foundation. In 2010, her foundation opened another theatre in Warsaw, the Och-Teatr in the district of Ochota. She has also worked as a columnist in a number of magazines such as Poradnik domowy, Pani, and Uroda. She is also a member of the supervisory board of the Fundacja Okularnicy, which is a foundation dedicated to the promotion and popularization of Agnieszka Osiecka's poetic legacy.

In 2019, she received the World Cinema Dramatic Special Jury Award for Acting for her role in Jacek Borcuch's film Dolce Fine Giornata at the 2019 Sundance Film Festival.

== Public health campaigns ==
On 30 December 2020, after she reported on social media that she was vaccinated out of turn against COVID-19 at the Medical University of Warsaw, she became the central figure of the so-called vaccine scandal (in Polish: afera szczepionkowa).

In 2022 she took part in pan-European depression awareness raising campaign.

== Personal life ==
In the years 1974–1979 she was married to fellow actor Andrzej Seweryn. In 1981, she again married Edward Kłosiński, who died on 5 January 2008. She has three children: daughter Maria Seweryn and two sons Adam and Jędrzej Kłosiński. She is Lutheran. Janda currently lives in Milanówek near Warsaw.

In 2015, she launched her own cosmetics brand under her own name.

== Selected filmography ==
- 1976: Man of Marble – Agnieszka
- 1977: Pani Bovary to ja – Krystyna
- 1977: Granica – Elżbieta Biecka
- 1977/1988: On the Silver Globe – Aza
- 1978: Without Anesthesia – Agata
- 1978: Bestia – Anna
- 1979: Manchmal besucht der Neffe die Tante (guest performance)
- 1979: Golem
- 1980: The Green Bird – Katzka Widuchowski
- 1980: The Orchestra Conductor – Marta
- 1980: Golem – Rozyna
- 1980: W biały dzień – Ewa
- 1980: Uoni – Kira Kirova
- 1981: On, ona, oni – psychologist
- 1981: Man of Iron – Agnieszka
- 1981: Mephisto – Barbara Bruckner
- 1981: The War of the Worlds: Next Century – Gea
- 1981: Fik – Mik – Doktor Anita
- 1982: Avant la bataille – as herself
- 1982: Ce fut un bel été – Wanda
- 1982: Espion, lève-toi – Anna Gretz
- 1982: Interrogation – Antonina Dziwisz
- 1983: Bella Donna – Lena
- 1983: Stan wewnętrzny – Ewa Jaskólska
- 1983: To tylko Rock – Majka Lenczewska
- 1983: Synteza – Gloria Lamb
- 1984: Embers – Anna
- 1984: O-Bi, O-Ba: The End of Civilization – Gea
- 1984: The Cop and the Girl – Gerlinde
- 1985: Vertiges – Maria
- 1985: Kochankowie mojej mamy – Krystyna Traczyk
- 1986: Laputa – Malgorzata
- 1986: Suspended – Anna Mroczyńska
- 1987: A Short Film About Killing – Dorota
- 1988: Dekalog: Two – Dorota Geller
- 1988: Dekalog: Five – Dorota Geller
- 1989: Inventory – Julia
- 1991: Kuchnia polska – Margaret Szymanko
- 1992: Zwolnieni z życia – French woman
- 1995: Pestka – Agata Koman
- 1995: Tato – Magda
- 1995: Opowieści weekendowe: Niepisane prawa – Halina
- 1995: Matka swojej matki – Ewa Kozłowska
- 1997: An Air So Pure – Ms. Leduroy
- 2000: Life as a Fatal Sexually Transmitted Disease – Anna
- 2000: Żółty szalik – wife
- 2000: Weiser – Elka
- 2001: Przedwiośnie – Jadwiga Barykowa
- 2002: Superprodukcja – Krystyna Janda
- 2005: Parę osób, mały czas – Jadwiga Stańczakowa
- 2005: The Call of the Toad – Aleksandra Piątkowska
- 2007: Ryś – Wiadro
- 2009: Tatarak – Marta / Actress
- 2009: Reverse – Irena Jankowska, Sabina's mother
- 2011: Elles – Alicja's mother
- 2014: All About My Parents — Grandmother
- 2015: Panie Dulskie – Melania Dulska's grandmother
- 2019: Dolce Fine Giornata
- 2026: The Doll

== Television series ==
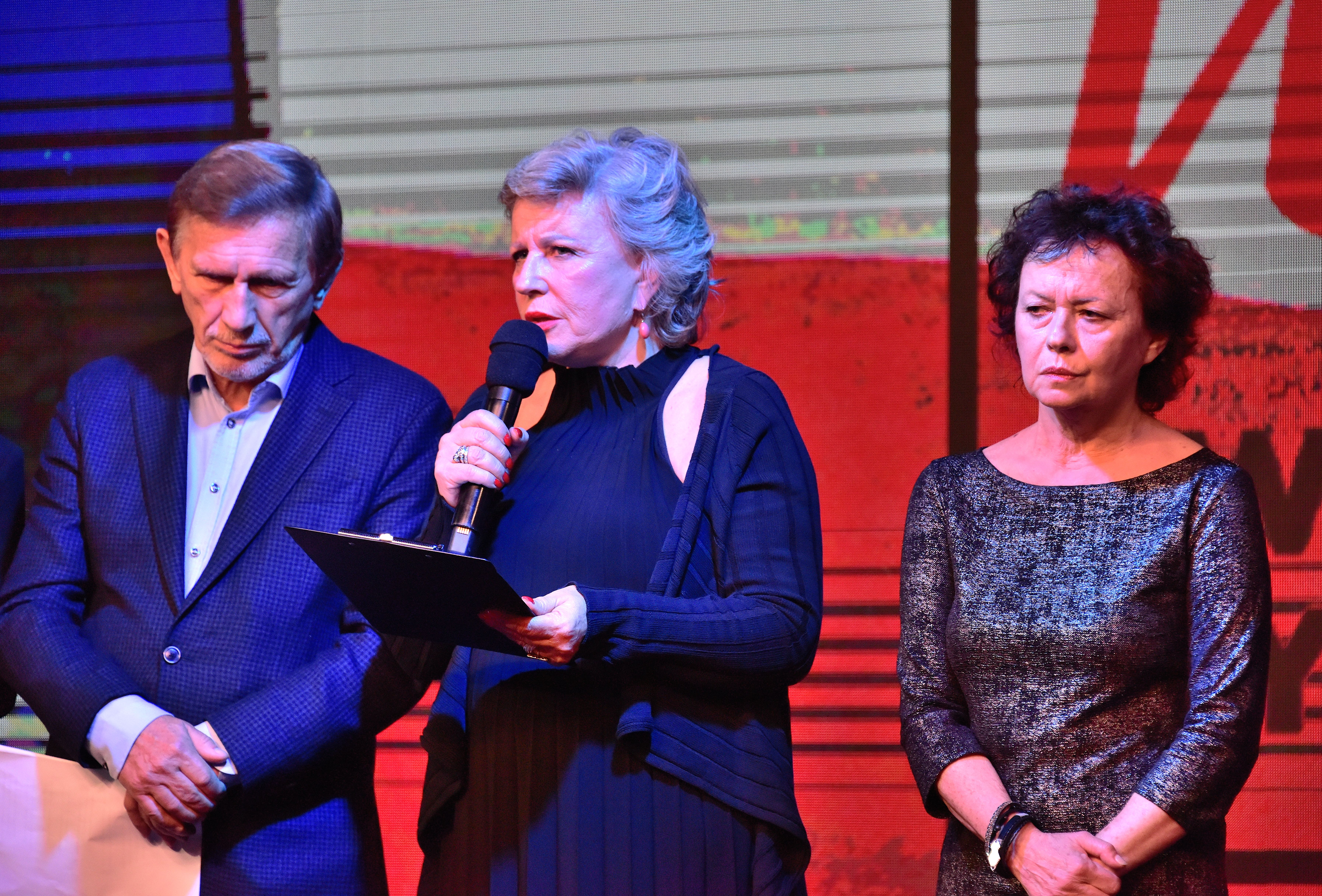
Krystyna Janda (middle), Jan Englert and Joanna Szczepkowska, Warsaw, 2019

- 1973: Czarne chmury, Polish TV series – dancer
- 1978: Rodzina Połanieckich, Polish TV series – Christina
- 1979: Doktor Murek, Polish TV series – Zośka "Arletka"
- 1984: Eine blassblaue Frauenschrift, Austrian TV film based on Pale Blue Ink in a Lady's Hand – Amelia Tachezy
- 1988: Wilder Westen inclusive – Marianne Küssling
- 1989: Modrzejewska, Polish TV series – Helena Modrzejewska
- 1991: Kuchnia polska, Polish political film and TV series – Margaret Szymanko
- 1993: The Great Bellheim – Maria Bellheim
- 2002: Przedwiośnie, TV series based on The Spring to Come novel – Jadwiga Barykowa
- 2003–2004: Męskie-żeńskie, Polish TV comedy series – Lilka Janicka
- 2007: Niania, TV series, remake of American sitcom The Nanny – Episode 66: "Moje perły" – as herself
- 2011: Bez tajemnic, Polish TV series – Barbara Lewicka
- 2023: Warszawianka – Maria Czułkowska

== Discography (guest performances) ==
- 1984: Krystyna Janda i Marek Grechuta W malinowym chruśniaku (Polskie Nagrania Muza)
- 1985: Music from Poland at midem '85 (Polskie Nagrania Muza)
- 1990: Marek Grechuta Anawa – Ocalić od zapomnienia (Polskie Nagrania Muza)
- 1991: Marek Grechuta Anawa – Ocalić od zapomnienia (Polskie Nagrania Muza)
- 1996: Summer Hits 2 – Piosenki na lato (Caston)
- 2001: Marek Grechuta Serce
- 2005: Marek Grechuta Serce (Pomaton EMI)
- 2007: Trójka live! Agnieszka Osiecka – Kobiety mojego życia (3 SKY MEDIA)
- Człowiek z żelaza śpiewa Balladę o Janku Wiśniewskim ("The Man of Marble Sings the Janek Wiśniewski Ballad")
- Pięć oceanów ("The Five Oceans") featuring Agnieszka Osiecka's works, Janda she sings the Na zakręcie song

== Honors and awards ==
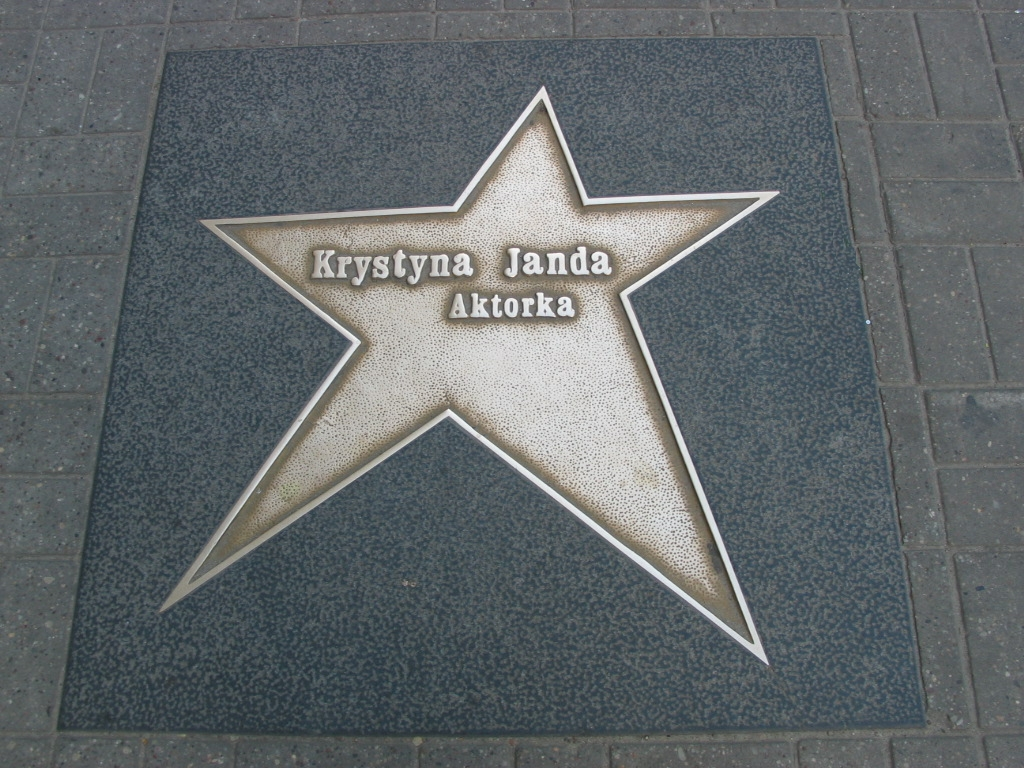
Krystyna Janda's star on the Łódź Walk of Fame

- Commander's Cross with Star of the Order of Polonia Restituta (2011)
- Golden Medal of the Medal for Merit to Culture - Gloria Artis (2005)
- Officer's Cross of the Order of Polonia Restituta (2002)
- Distinguished Cultural Activist Award (1997)
- Ordre des Arts et des Lettres (1991, France)
- Golden Cross of Merit (1989)

=== Other awards ===
- Zbigniew Cybulski Award (1978)
- Silver Asteroid for the role in Piotr Szulkin's film Golem at the 19th Trieste Science+Fiction Festival (1981)
- Best Actress Award at the Montreal World Film Festival (1986)
- Aleksander Zelwerowicz Award (1988)
- Polish Cultural Foundation Award for her role in the film Interrogation (1989)
- Vittorio de Sica Medal (1990)
- Golden Duck for Best Actress (1990)
- Best Actress Award at the Gdynia Film Festival (1990)
- Best Actress Award at the Cannes Film Festival (1990)
- Nomination for European Film Awards, Best Actress category (1990)
- Best Actress Award at the Belgrade Film Festival for her role in Ryszard Bugajski's film Interrogation (1991)
- Silver Shell at the San Sebastian Film Festival (1992)
- Golden Duck for Best Actress (1993)
- Best Debut Award for her film Pestka at the 20th Gdynia Film Festival(1995)
- Super Golden Duck for Best Actress in the History of Polish Cinema (1996)
- Telekamera Audience Award for the Most Popular Actress (1998)
- SuperWiktor Lifetime Achievement Award (1998)
- Nomination for Polish Film Awards for Best Actress Award in the film Life as a Fatal Sexually Transmitted Disease(2001)
- Golden Lions Award at the Gdynia Film Festival for the film Parę osób, mały czas (2005)
- Medaille Charlemagne pour des Medias Européens (2006)
- Nomination for Polish Film Awards for Best Actress Award in the film The Call of the Toad (2006)
- Golden Duck for Best Actress of Half a Century (2007)
- Hiacynt LGBT Award for "her unwavering support for the idea of tolerance in her theatre, film and Internet activity" (2007)
- Nomination for Polish Film Awards for Best Actress Award in the film Parę osób, mały czas (2008)
- The Capital City of Warsaw Award for her contributions to the promotion of the city of Warsaw (2011)
- World Cinema Dramatic Special Jury Award for Acting at the Sundance Film Festival (2019)

== See also ==
- Cinema of Poland
