= Miodowe lata =

- Genre: Sitcom
- Starring: Cezary Żak; Artur Barciś; Agnieszka Pilaszewska; Katarzyna Żak; Dorota Chotecka; Marta Lipińska
- Country of origin: Poland
- Original language: Polish
- No. of seasons: 9
- No. of episodes: 131

Original release
- Network: Polsat
- Release: 13 October 1998 – 20 December 2003

Miodowe lata (lit. Honey years) is a popular Polish television sitcom, produced by Polsat from 1998 to 2003. It is the Polish version of the American sitcom The Honeymooners. The sitcom was realised in the Warsaw theatre.

In 2004 the sequel to the sitcom, Całkiem nowe lata miodowe, was created.

The show follows the life of two Polish families, Krawczyks and Noreks, who live in apartment in Wola on Wolska 33 street.

Karol Krawczyk is a tram driver. His friend, Tadeusz Norek works in the Warsaw sewerage. They try to make various schemes to improve their financial or life situation, all of which ultimately fail. Their wives, Alina (Karol's wife) and Danuta (Tadeusz's wife) try to stop their ideas, but in vain.

== Characters ==
- Karol Krawczyk (Cezary Żak) is a tram driver, and the main character of the sitcom. He is very fat, selfish and grudging. Often, he argues with Norek, Zofia or Alina. He thinks that his ideas are brilliant and he doesn't listen to his wife. Usually he gets into trouble by his "brilliant ideas". His character is similar to that of Ralph Kramden.
- Tadeusz Norek (Artur Barciś) is a sewage worker, and the secondary main character of the sitcom; he is Karol's friend and neighbour. He is nice, infantile and very skinny. He helps Karol in his ideas. He likes cartoons. He's henpecked and very afraid of his wife, Danuta. Often he eats Karol's food, because Danuta is a bad cook. His character is similar to that of Ed Norton.
- Alina Krawczyk (Agnieszka Pilaszewska, Katarzyna Żak) is Karol's wife and a housewife. She's intelligent and a very good cook. Her best friend is Danuta. Usually, she explains to her husband that his ideas are stupid and foolish, but he doesn't listen to her. Her character is similar to that of Alice Kramden.
- Danuta Norek (Dorota Chotecka) is Tadeusz's wife, a housewife and Alina's best friend. She's consistent. Usually, she yells at her husband and beats him. She's seductive, she likes men. She called his husband "Tadzik!". Her character is somewhat similar to that of Trixie Norton.
- Zofia Rudnik (Marta Lipińska) is Alina's mother and Karol's mother-in-law. She hates him. Usually, she visits her daughter and argues with Karol.
- Edward Rudnik (né Cieszkowski) (Wojciech Pokora) is Alina's father, Karol's father-in-law and Zofia's husband, henpecked, he took his wife's last name.
- Roman Kurski (Waldemar Obłoza) is Krawczyks' and the Noreks' neighbour, jailbird. He likes vodka. He was held in well-known Polish prisons (in Rawicz and Wronki).
- Grzelakowa (Krystyna Kołodziejczyk-Szyszko) is the Krawczyks' and Noreks' neighbour.
- Dr. Zawisza (Jarosław Gajewski) is a doctor and psychiatrist. Often, he cures Karol or Tadeusz. He is stupid and crazy.
- Jan Marszałek (Marek Barbasiewicz) is Karol's boss. He is very smart. He lived in the United States for ten years. He called his wife "Tygrysku!" ("Tigger").
- Pamela Marszałek (Agnieszka Różańska) is Marszałek's wife. She is pretty, but very, very stupid. She called by her husband "Kłapouszku!" ("Eeyore").

== See also ==
- The Honeymooners
