= Man of Marble =

- Polish poster advertising the film
- Directed by: Andrzej Wajda
- Written by: Aleksander Ścibor-Rylski
- Starring: Krystyna Janda; Jerzy Radziwiłowicz; Tadeusz Łomnicki
- Cinematography: Edward Kłosiński
- Edited by: Halina Prugar-Ketling
- Music by: Andrzej Korzyński
- Release date: 25 February 1977
- Running time: 165 minutes
- Country: Poland
- Language: Polish

Man of Marble (Polish: Człowiek z marmuru) is a 1977 Polish film directed by Andrzej Wajda. It chronicles the fall from grace of a fictional heroic Polish bricklayer, Mateusz Birkut (played by Jerzy Radziwiłowicz), who became the Stakhanovite symbol of an over-achieving worker, in Nowa Huta, a new (real-life) socialist city near Kraków. Agnieszka, played by Krystyna Janda in her first role, is a young filmmaker who is making her diploma film (a student graduation requirement) on Birkut, whose whereabouts seem to have been lost two decades later. The title refers to the propagandist marble statues made in Birkut's image.

Man of Marble reflects director Wajda's emerging hostility to the Stalinist cultural establishment and its oppressive restrictions on artistic expression. The film's plot foretells the Lenin Shipyard strike of 1980 and the rise of the Solidarity Movement.

== Plot ==
Agnieszka is a young filmmaker who is making her film thesis on Mateusz Birkut, a bricklayer elevated as a hero in a political stunt to increase construction efficiency and brick quotas. However, he has since fallen out of favour with the Party and other officials. His current whereabouts seem to have been lost two decades later, and she attempts to piece together the details of his downfall. Agnieszka has difficulty making the film from archival sources and museum collections, but little work remains outside of official propaganda.

Then Agnieszka goes to successful director Jerzy Burski, who recounts the details from the making of his unfinished film, Building Our Happiness. The truth behind the propaganda film comes to light, revealing how Birkut was selected as an example for demonstrating the progress and efficiency of a new industrial city Nowa Huta. Selected by Jodla, the local Party Secretary, Birkut's fame spread from the bricklaying record of 30,000 bricks in one shift launched him to stardom. Burski does not divulge much about Birkut following his initial rise but puts her in touch with a man who knew Birkut personally.

Agnieszka then goes to Michalak, an agent of an unnamed state organization who tailed Birkut during his fame. He acted a dual role of security and keeping tabs on Birkut's activities. He shares the details of an accident which stopped Birkut from continuing his bricklaying feats: A heated brick was mixed in with the rest, burning his hands badly. Michalak then sheds light on Birkut's activities after being placed in the inspectorate. A seemingly true believer, Birkut was beloved by the working people and fought for their betterment. Stalled by a lazy and selfish bureaucracy, Birkut loses heart and increasingly butts heads with powerful politicians and officials. At the same time as his own health was failing, Birkut's friend from the bricklaying feats Wincenty Witek is arrested by the state and Birkut fights for his release (all during the wave of purges and show trials that happened just before the death of Stalin in most of eastern bloc countries). Losing hope, Birkut falls into despair and drunkenly attacks a local party building, breaking a window.

Next Agnieszka watches archive newsreels from the trial of Birkut's friend Witek and others in what was known as the trial of the “Skocznia Gang” who sought to reduce worker efficiency and sabotaging construction sites. Witek and Birkut both seem to have been sentenced to prison terms and reeducation.

After the trial and release from reeducation, Witek has successfully turned his career around and is now an important official in Katowice. When interviewed, he recounts Birkut's return from prison, in which Witek has accepted the party line and tries to encourage Birkut to do the same. Throughout Agnieszka's time with him he dodges questions and continuously praises the advances being made at Katowice.

Next the film crew go to Zakopane and interview Hanka, Birkut's wife before his denunciation as a traitor. Yet when she realizes the topic of her interview, she becomes extremely distressed. She recounts the story of how Birkut tracked her down and met with her. Again Birkut is given the opportunity to take advantage of his past and become successful, but again he seems to have turned it down. Hanka has fallen into drunkenness and shame.

Upon reviewing Agnieszka's progress the authorities are displeased, and ultimately rescind support for her movie. Her cameras and film reels she gathered are confiscated. New film of Birkut is found in the archives, but they are not allowed access to editing it and including it in what they have remaining of her film.

Agnieszka's father consoles her about her film and speculates that there must be a single specific reason for the authorities' fear of further disclosure and suggests that she should locate Birkut and talk to him to find out more, even if she is no longer involved in making the film. With this inspiration, Agnieszka tracks down Mateusz's son, Maciej, in the Gdańsk Shipyard. Agnieszka learns from Maciej that his father died years ago. The film ends with Maciej walking into the film office with Agnieszka.

== Production ==
It is somewhat of a surprise that Wajda would have been able to make such a film, sub silentio attacking the socialist realism of Nowa Huta, revealing the use of propaganda and political corruption during the period of Stalinism. The film director presaged the loosening grip of the Soviets that came with the Solidarity Movement, though it has been acknowledged by Polish film historians that due to censorship the script languished in development hell since 1962. The film extensively uses original documentation footage from the construction of Nowa Huta and other subjects of Poland's early communist era, as well as the propagandist/inspirational music of Stalinist Poland.

Agnieszka has trouble making the film from archival sources and museum collections and from interviews with people whose answers provide partial information on Birkut's life, but who don't seem to know about his current location or situation. The authorities decide that the young student digs too deeply into the recent past, and inform her that their permission to create the film is withdrawn. Her equipment and the materials she gathered are confiscated. Agnieszka's father speculates that there must be a single specific reason for the authorities' fear of further disclosure and suggests that she should locate Birkut and talk to him to find out more, even if she is no longer involved in making the film. With this inspiration, Agnieszka tracks down Mateusz's son, Maciej, in the Gdańsk Shipyard. (Both father and son, Mateusz and Maciej, are played by the same actor: Jerzy Radziwiłowicz.) Agnieszka learns from Maciej that his father died years ago.

The ending of Man of Marble leaves the death of Mateusz Birkut ambiguous. In his script, Wajda had wanted to reveal that Mateusz had been killed in clashes at the shipyards in 1970, a major confrontation that prefigured the rise of Solidarity ten years later, but he was prevented by censorship. In 1981, Wajda filmed Man of Iron, a follow-up to Man of Marble, which depicts Maciej's subsequent involvement in the Polish anti-authoritarian workers' movement. Man of Iron extensively deals with Mateusz's killing in the clashes of 1970. Donota Niemitz and Stefan Steinberg write:

Man of Marble conveys the mood of growing popular discontent. The film also presciently anticipates the future development of the Solidarity union movement by ending with a scene in which Agnieszka finally manages to meet Maciek, Birkut’s son, in front of the gates of the Lenin Shipyard in Gdańsk (where workers stage a historic strike in 1980, precipitating a major crisis for the Stalinist officialdom).

== Cast ==
- Jerzy Radziwiłowicz – Mateusz Birkut / Maciej Tomczyk
- Krystyna Janda – Agnieszka
- Tadeusz Łomnicki – Jerzy Burski
- Jacek Łomnicki – Young Burski
- Michał Tarkowski – Wincenty Witek
- Piotr Cieślak – Michalak
- Wiesław Wójcik – Jodła
- Krystyna Zachwatowicz – Hanka
- Magda Teresa Wójcik – Editor
- Bogusław Sobczuk – TV Producer
- Leonard Zajączkowski – Leonard Zajączkowski, Cameraman
- Jacek Domański – Soundman
- Irena Laskowska – Museum Employee
- Zdzisław Kozień – Agnieszka's Father
- Wiesław Drzewicz – Hanka's Husband
- Saskia Taylor – Hanka's Daughter

== Reception ==
On review aggregator website Rotten Tomatoes, the film holds an approval rating of 75% based on 8 reviews, with an average rating of 8.0/10.

== Accolades ==
The film was entered into the Un Certain Regard section at the 1978 Cannes Film Festival and won the FIPRESCI Prize.

== Sources ==
- Niemitz, Dorota. 2014. The legacy of postwar Polish filmmaker Andrzej Munk. World Socialist Web Site. 13 October 2014. https://www.wsws.org/en/articles/2014/10/13/munk-o13.html Retrieved 8 July 2022.
