= Dekalog: Six =

1989 film from cycle directed by Krzysztof Kieślowski

- Directed by: Krzysztof Kieślowski
- Written by: Krzysztof Kieślowski; Krzysztof Piesiewicz
- Produced by: Ryszard Chutkovski
- Starring: Olaf Lubaszenko; Grażyna Szapołowska
- Cinematography: Witold Adamek
- Edited by: Ewa Smal
- Music by: Zbigniew Preisner
- Distributed by: Polish Television
- Release date: September 1989 (Venice)
- Running time: 58 minutes
- Country: Poland
- Language: Polish
- Budget: $10,000

Dekalog: Six (Polish: Dekalog, sześć) is the sixth part of Dekalog, the drama series of films directed by Polish director Krzysztof Kieślowski for television, possibly connected to the sixth imperative of the Ten Commandments: "Thou shalt not commit adultery."

A naive young man, Tomek (Olaf Lubaszenko), spies on a woman, Magda (Grażyna Szapołowska), and falls in love with her. An extended 86-minute feature version of this film is called Krótki film o miłości (A Short Film About Love).

The ten-part Dekalog series was exhibited in its entirety at the 46th Venice International Film Festival in September 1989, in the Special Events section. Dekalog: Six premiered on Polish Television on 8 June 1990.

Along with Dekalog: Five, the film screened in the Cannes Classics section at the 2016 Cannes Film Festival.

== Plot ==
Tomek (Olaf Lubaszenko) is a nineteen-year-old orphan, living with the mother of a friend and working at the local post office. He has been observing an attractive woman in her thirties, Magda (Grażyna Szapołowska), who lives in an apartment opposite his, and has fallen in love with her. He sends false notices from the post office to her, inviting her to pick up money which does not exist, just to speak to her. In the evenings, he spies on her through a telescope he has stolen and makes silent phone calls to her. Magda sees many men in her apartment and Tomek manages to ruin one of her dates by calling the gas service to check a non-existent leak.

Tomek wants to meet Magda, and he takes an extra job delivering milk to her apartment block in the mornings. Magda goes to the post office to collect a new note that Tomek sent her and is accused by the office manager of trying to rob the office by presenting false notes. Magda storms out of the post office; Tomek follows her and confesses to his peeping. She initially does not believe him, but when he says that she was weeping last night she becomes angry, because it was true.

That night Magda spots Tomek peeping again and makes signs that he should phone her. He does so and she tells him to watch closely. She receives her current lover and, just as they are about to begin having sex, she stops and tells him of the peeping going on. He becomes angry, goes to Tomek's building and demands to speak with him; Tomek comes out and is hit by Magda's boyfriend.

The next day Magda opens the door as Tomek is delivering milk; he declares his love to her. After inquiring as to what he wants from her, which he cannot answer, she accepts a date to have ice cream. After the ice cream she engages in a little game: if they reach the bus home before it leaves, he must go to her apartment, if not, he must go home. Back at her apartment, she takes his hands and places them on her almost naked body. He is very excited and ejaculates before he can touch anything other than her thighs. After this, she says that's all there is to love; if he wants to clean up "the love" there are towels in the bathroom. Tomek is shattered and storms out of her place. Magda then feels bad and puts a sign in her window saying "Sorry, please come back". He does not and tries to commit suicide by slashing his wrists. He is taken to hospital. Magda does not see him for a long time and becomes worried.

Magda is now obsessed with Tomek and tries to do everything to see him and talk to him and explain everything. Sometime later, Tomek is back from the hospital and working again at the post office. Magda comes to see him there. Tomek softly says "I am no longer spying on you."

== Cast ==
- Grażyna Szapołowska - Magda
- Olaf Lubaszenko - Tomek
- Stefania Iwińska - Godmother
- Artur Barciś - young man
- Stanisław Gawlik - postman
- Piotr Machalica - Roman
- Rafal Imbro - bearded man
- Jan Piechociński - blond man
- Malgorzata Rozniatowska, M. Chojnacka, T. Gradowski, K. Koperski, J. Michalewska, E Zilkowska (in other roles)

=== Cast notes ===
- Of the actors appearing in other episodes, we can briefly see the Piotr Machalica, who played the role of Roman in Dekalog: Nine.
- Artur Barciś plays again one of his mysterious cameo roles as young man.
