= Dekalog: Seven =

1989 film from cycle directed by Krzysztof Kieślowski

- Directed by: Krzysztof Kieślowski
- Written by: Krzysztof Kieślowski; Krzysztof Piesiewicz
- Produced by: Ryszard Chutkovski
- Starring: Anna Polony; Maja Barelkowska; Katarzyna Piwowarczyk
- Cinematography: Dariusz Kuc
- Edited by: Ewa Smal
- Music by: Zbigniew Preisner
- Distributed by: Polish Television
- Release date: September 1989 (Venice)
- Running time: 55 minutes
- Country: Poland
- Language: Polish
- Budget: $10,000

Dekalog: Seven (Polish: Dekalog, siedem) is the seventh part of Dekalog, the drama series of films directed by Polish director Krzysztof Kieślowski for television, connected to the seventh imperative of the Ten Commandments: "Thou shalt not steal".

A young woman (Maja Barelkowska) abducts her own child, who has been raised by her parents as her sister.

The ten-part Dekalog series was exhibited in its entirety at the 46th Venice International Film Festival in September 1989, in the Special Events section. Dekalog: Seven premiered on Polish Television on 15 June 1990.

== Plot ==
Prior to the events of the film: Ewa is the mother of 22-year-old Majka. She was unable to have any more children after Majka, although she would have liked to. She became headmistress of a school where she hired a literature professor, Wojtek. Wojtek met and seduced then-16-year-old Majka, who got pregnant and had a daughter, Ania. However, due to the 'scandal' of it all, Majka was forced to pretend that Ania was actually her little sister rather than her daughter, and Wojtek avoided charges for seducing a minor by simply walking away.

The film: Twenty-two-year-old Majka (Maja Barelkowska), who still lives with her parents, is expelled from university during her last term and wants to flee to Canada with Ania. She needs her mother's signature, however, in order to obtain Ania's passport. Six-year-old Ania (Katarzyna Piwowarczyk) has recurrent nightmares and can only be consoled by Majka's mother, Ewa (Anna Polony). Majka's father, Stefan (Wladyslaw Kowalski), spends his time fixing a pipe organ in their apartment. Ewa is just as cruel to Majka as she is affectionate to Ania.

Ewa takes Ania to school to watch a school theatre performance. Majka manages to get into the school hall too and takes Ania away. Ewa is shocked by Ania's disappearance. Ania, meanwhile, believes that all of this is just a game with her 'sister'. Finally, Majka tells her that she is not her sister, but her mother and that Ewa is her grandmother. Ania seems to understand and then asks who her father is.

Majka goes to Wojtek's house in the country. He now earns a living by making Teddy bears. They meet for the first time in six years, and Wojtek is surprised and somewhat uncomfortable to see his daughter. While they are there, Majka's father, Stefan, calls, but Wojtek lies and tells him that he has not seen Majka in six years. Ewa begs Stefan to call up his former political acquaintances to help them find Ania. While Ania sleeps, Majka and Wojtek discuss their past. In her sleep, Ania grabs Wojtek's finger and he begins to warm to her. Meanwhile, Majka goes out to ring Ewa and Stefan from a phone booth. She tells them her conditions regarding Ania, namely that she be recognized as her mother and that they be left alone. In the meantime, Ania has woken up and engages in conversation with Wojtek who is now very affectionate towards her. Majka has come back and asks Ania to address her as her mother, but she can only call her Majka.

Ania falls asleep again. Wojtek tells Majka to consider going back to her parents' place in Warsaw, since the trauma of the entire ordeal could be too much for Ania. Majka agrees and Wojtek promises to get a friend, who has a van, to take them back. When Wojtek returns with his friend, Majka and Ania are gone. Majka calls Ewa again and demands that she agree to all her previous conditions and organize the necessary documents to get Ania's passport and visa for Canada. Ewa tries to negotiate but Majka is relentless - either Ewa agrees to her demands or else she will never see Ania again. After a moment's silence Majka hangs up, just as Ewa is about to agree to her terms. The phone rings again at Ewa and Stefan's. It is Wojtek - he admits to his earlier lie and offers his help locating Majka.

Majka and Ania head to the local country train station. They want to buy a ticket but, it being Sunday, there will not be another train for two hours. The woman at the ticket office, suspecting that Majka might be fleeing from something, perhaps domestic violence, offers the two of them shelter in her office until the train arrives. Ewa and Stefan arrive at the train station and ask the woman at the ticket office about Majka and Ania. The woman tells them that they left two hours ago, but Ania unwittingly reveals their location when hearing her grandmother's voice. Ania excitedly runs towards Ewa, and a sad, discouraged Majka cannot confront her mother and boards the train alone. Ania then runs after her and the train, understanding that something irreparable has just happened.

== Cast ==
- Anna Polony - Ewa
- Maja Barełkowska - Majka
- Wladysław Kowalski - Stefan
- Bogusław Linda - Wojtek
- Bozena Dykiel - ticket woman
- Katarzyna Piwowarczyk - Ania
- Dariusz Jabłoński - friend of Wojtek
