= Grażyna Szapołowska =

Polish actress (born 1953)

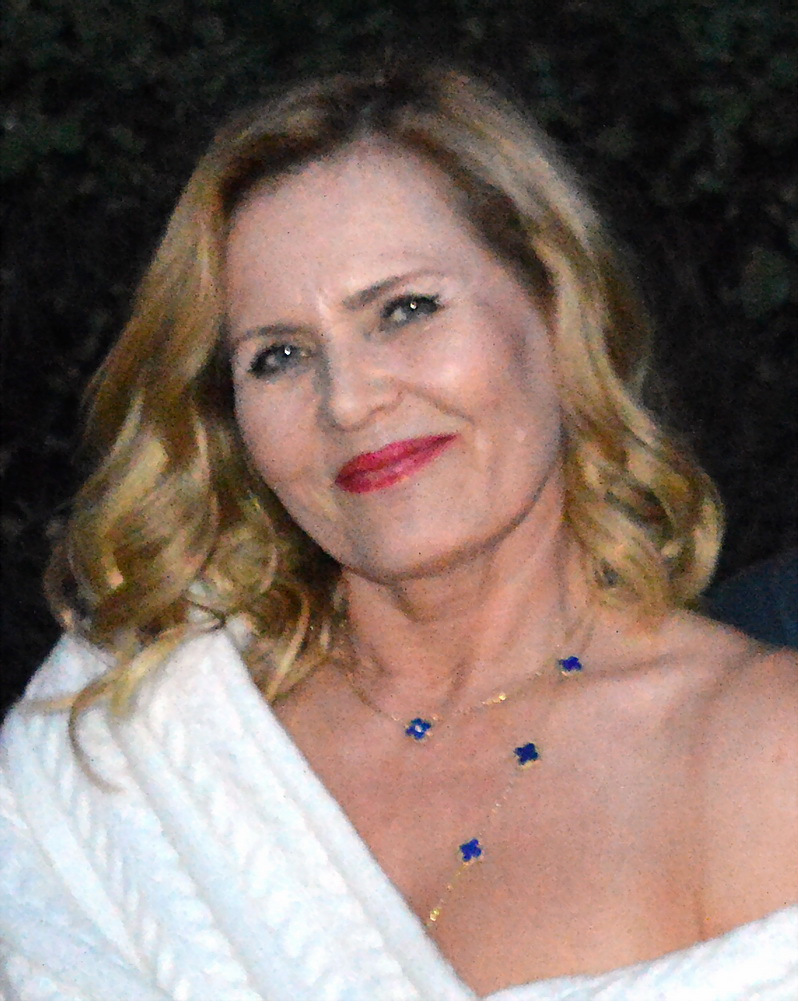
- Grażyna Szapołowska, 2018
- Born: 19 September 1953 (age 72); Bydgoszcz, Poland
- Education: National Academy of Dramatic Art in Warsaw
- Occupation: Actress
- Years active: 1972–present

Grażyna Szapołowska (Polish pronunciation: [ɡraˈʐɨna ʂapɔˈwɔfska]; born 19 September 1953) is a Polish film and theatre actress.

== Life and career ==
She was born in Bydgoszcz. The father was of Latvian-Polish descent, and mother, Wanda, was Lithuanian-Polish descent. She has a sister, Lidia, who is 11 years older. After passing the baccalauréat she joined at Wroclaw Theatre of Pantomime. In 1977 she graduated from the National Academy of Dramatic Art in Warsaw. From 1977 until 1984 she was in the theatrical company of the National Theatre, Warsaw.

She starred in Károly Makk's 1982 Hungarian film Another Way which portrays a lesbian relationship, A Short Film About Love (1988) by Polish film director Krzysztof Kieślowski, and in its earlier and shorter form the sixth episode of Dekalog. It was she who suggested to Kieslowski the different ending of the full-length version. For that role she received the Polish Film Award at the 13th Gdynia Film Festival. She had previously starred in another Kieslowski film, Bez końca. She is also widely known for her portrayal of Telimena in Andrzej Wajda's 1999 film Pan Tadeusz, an adaptation of Adam Mickiewicz's epic poem of the same name. She was honoured with the Polish Academy Award for Best Actress for that role.

In 2008 she was one of the contestants of the Polish version of Soapstar Superstar reality singing competition.

She also performed on stage as an interpreter of an actor's song. She sings in a soprano.

== Filmography ==
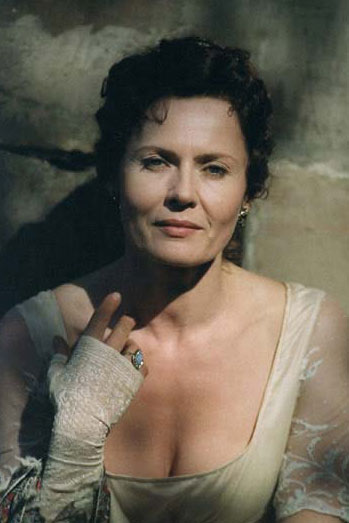
Grażyna Szapołowska, 2008

- 1974 Najważniejszy dzień życia, episode Telefon (Telephone)
- 1977 Parada oszustów (Chet's Parade)
- 1978 Zapach ziemi (The Smell of Earth)
- 1978 Osiemdziesięciu huzarów (80 Hussars)
- 1981 Wielka majówka (The Big Picnic)
- 1982 Wielki Szu (Big Shar)
- 1982 Egymásra nézve (Another Way)
- 1983 Lata dwudzieste... lata trzydzieste... (The Twenties, the Thirties )
- 1983 Nadzór (Custody)
- 1984 Bez końca (No End)
- 1984 Szirmok, virágok, koszorúk (The Flowers of Reverie)
- 1984 Przyspieszenie (To accelerate)
- 1985 Medium
- 1985 By Touch (Przez dotyk)
- 1986 Magnat (The Magnate)
- 1986 Biała wizytówka (White visiting-card)
- 1987 Tabu (Taboo)
- 1987 Zagon
- 1987 Первая встреча, последняя встреча (СССР)
- 1988 Hanussen
- 1988 Krótki film o miłości (A Short Film About Love)
- 1989 A Tale of Adam Mickiewicz's 'Forefathers' Eve'
- 1991 Żegnaj, cudzoziemko (Goodbye foreigner)
- 1991 Lebewohl, Fremde
- 1991 The Conviction
- 1992 Piękna nieznajoma (A Beautiful Stranger)
- 1993 Piazza di Spagna (The Spanish Square)
- 1997 Kroniki domowe
- 1997 Our God's Brother
- 1999 Pan Tadeusz (Pan Tadeusz: The Last Foray in Lithuania)
- 2004 Nachbarinnen (Wanted!)
- 2005 Ewa paliła Camele
- 2005 Karol: A Man Who Became Pope
- 2006 Just Love Me
- 2006 Magda M.
- 2007 Ryś
- 2007 Jutro idziemy do kina
- 2008 Nie kłam kochanie
- 2011 Easter Goes Polish
- 2013 Run Boy Run as Ewa Staniak
- 2017 Nie kłam kochanie

== See also ==
- Polish cinema
- Polish Film Awards
