= Dekalog: Two =

1989 second part of the television series The Decalogue directed by Krzysztof Kieślowski

- Directed by: Krzysztof Kieślowski
- Written by: Krzysztof Kieślowski; Krzysztof Piesiewicz
- Produced by: Ryszard Chutkovski
- Starring: Krystyna Janda; Aleksander Bardini; Olgierd Łukaszewicz
- Cinematography: Edward Kłosiński
- Edited by: Ewa Smal
- Music by: Zbigniew Preisner
- Distributed by: Polish Television
- Release date: September 1989 (Venice)
- Running time: 57 minutes
- Country: Poland
- Language: Polish
- Budget: $10,000

Dekalog: Two (Polish: Dekalog, dwa) is the second part of Dekalog, the drama series of films directed by Polish director Krzysztof Kieślowski for television, connected to the second imperative of the Ten Commandments: "Thou shalt not take the name of the Lord thy God in vain."

Dorota Geller, a married woman, faces a dilemma involving her sick husband's prognosis. Her husband's doctor, who believes in God, is made to swear by his prognosis, but gets it wrong.

The ten-part Dekalog series was exhibited in its entirety at the 46th Venice International Film Festival in September 1989, in the Special Events section. Dekalog: Seven premiered on Polish Television on 11 May 1990.

== Plot ==
The episode focuses on two people: an elderly hospital doctor (Aleksander Bardini), who lives by himself in the ubiquitous Dekalog apartment block; and Dorota Geller (Krystyna Janda), a woman in her 30s who lives in the same building and is a violinist with the Philharmonic Orchestra.

The doctor spends his free time raising plants and birds in his house. He tells bits of his life to his cleaning lady, Barbara, in the form of episodes ending with "to be continued": an adult losing his tooth, a child growing a tooth, how he lost his whole family during the war.

The doctor meets Dorota as he is entering the elevator one morning, as she smokes a cigarette in the hallway looking out of the window. He greets her while she merely nods. She apparently wants to talk to him, but is not courageous enough at first. The doctor returns from buying milk and runs across Dorota again, since she has not moved from the spot where they met earlier. She remains silent and walks to his apartment door only after he has shut the door behind him. He opens and she still does not speak to him. He finally says: "You want something from me". She replies "Yes. You probably remember me. I live in the penthouse". He confirms that he remembers her, because she ran over his dog with her car two years earlier. Dorota finally introduces herself and reveals that she urgently wants a prognosis of the condition of her husband, who is seriously ill in hospital. The doctor replies firmly but courteously that his visiting hours are not until the day after next. She replies, "I am sorry that I did not run over you" and walks away. Later that day he meets her again still smoking in the same spot and asks her if a dead hare which the concierge found earlier is hers, which she denies. He then takes pity on her and asks her to come to the hospital that afternoon. There he asks for Andrzej Geller's file and sees Dorota sitting at the bedside helplessly. She has brought preserved strawberries. After seeing Andrzej in his weakened state, she decides to keep them, but Andrzej's previously silent and seemingly unconscious roommate says that Andrzej might eat them later. She leaves and says goodbye to the roommate, but not to her husband. Dorota waits in front of the doctor's office. The doctor tells her that Andrzej is very ill and that things are not looking good, but he also says that in his experience patients with even less chance than him have recovered, so his prognosis is guarded. She angrily says that "I must know..." but is interrupted and deflected by the doctor.

At the end of the day Dorota follows the doctor to his home in her car. When he opens his door, she enters and smokes without asking permission, using her matchbox as an ashtray and causing a flame when extinguishing the cigarette. She reveals that she is 3 months pregnant, but not by her husband, and that this is her last chance of having a child. She insists one can love two individuals romantically at the same time. She wants to know if Andrzej will live. She has decided that if he dies, she will carry the child to term - if he survives, she will abort it. At her home, a friend of her husband comes to return Andrzej's mountaineering gear. She angrily tells him that Andrzej is still alive and that his gear belongs in the mountaineering club. The team will be leaving for India.

The next day Dorota goes to the gynaecologist and schedules an abortion in two days. She meets with an acquaintance of her lover's, who is a pianist on tour. Her lover has requested she bring the musical scores he has left on his piano when she joins him abroad. At night her lover calls and she tells him she will abort their child. He says he wants to be with her and does not understand her.

The next day in the hospital's medical laboratory, the doctor reviews three tissue samples under a microscope. He asks a medical resident for his opinion, and he starts "You have always taught us...", which the doctor interrupts, saying "Never mind that." A laboratory assistant/hospital orderly looks sternly on. The resident then says "progression." When Dorota returns to the hospital ward she sees a corpse being rolled out and, upon entering, realizes it is not Andrzej but the roommate who appeared healthier than him the day before. She approaches her husband, who looks very weak, declares her love and touches him for the first time in the film; the lab assistant/orderly is shown staring intensely.

Dorota interrupts a doctors' meeting to remind the doctor that she is going to have an abortion in one hour. He tells her not to go ahead with it, because Andrzej is apparently dying, with metastases growing, and has no chance of surviving. She makes him swear by this prognosis, which he does and walks out. He tells her that he wants to listen to her in the Philharmonic one day.

In a typically "Kieślowskiesque" scene, Andrzej opens his eyes for the first time and observes how a bee miraculously manages to climb on a spoon out of a glass with the preserved strawberries in it. Andrzej gets up at night and knocks at the doctor's office door to awaken the sleeping doctor. The doctor asks him to take a seat. Andrzej says that he has come back from the "beyond" where everything looked like it was decaying and that he is back now, happy to be able to touch a table, and to have a baby with Dorota. He asks the doctor if he understands what it means to have a child, to which the doctor replies, 'I do'.

== Theme ==
The second commandment is about sanctity of speech, where names are fundamental to identity and moral choice, and the importance of one's word in human life. It is notable that the doctor's name is never revealed in the episode. Other moral or ethical dilemmas of the characters in this film are murder and punishment, and the nature and relation of love and passion.

== Cast ==
- Krystyna Janda - Dorota
- Aleksander Bardini - the doctor
- Olgierd Łukaszewicz - Andrzej
- Artur Barciś - laboratory assistant/hospital orderly
- Stanisław Gawlik - postman Wacek
- Krzysztof Kumor - gynaecologist
- Krystyna Bigelmajer - nurse
- Karol Dillenius - patient in Andrzej's hospital room
- Jerzy Fedorowicz - Janek, friend of Andrzej

Actors from other episodes playing different roles:

- Krystyna Bigelmajer
- Ewa Ekwinska
- Piotr Siejka
- Aleksander Trąbczyński

== Adaptations ==
The 2009 Bengali film Dwando directed by Suman Ghosh is based on this film, with Ananya Chatterjee playing the wife, Kaushik Sen playing the husband, and Soumitra Chatterjee playing the doctor.
