= Olgierd Łukaszewicz =

Polish actor (born 1946)

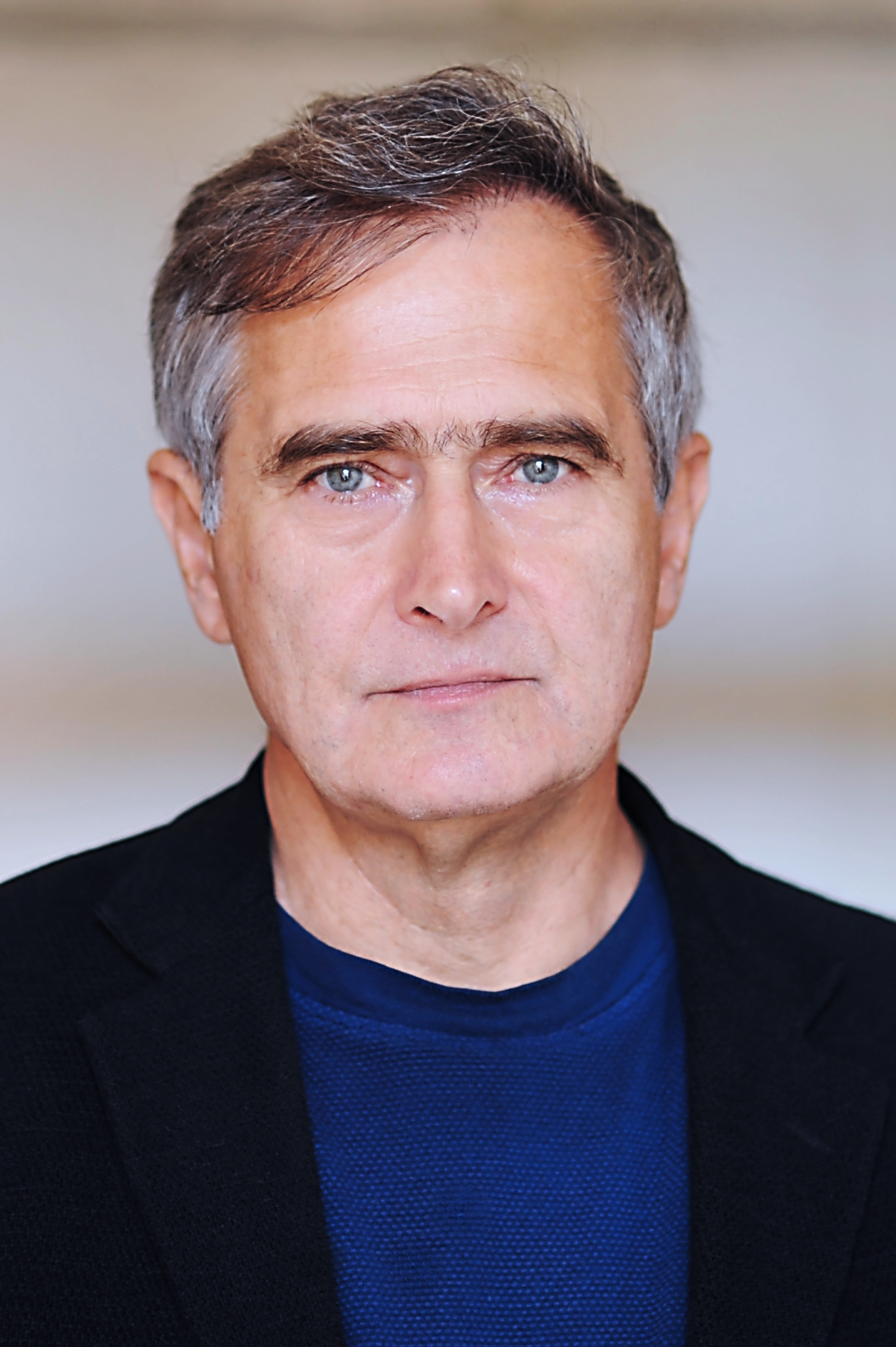
- Born: 7 September 1946 (age 79); Chorzów, Poland
- Occupation: Actor
- Years active: 1969–present
- Spouse: Grażyna Marzec
- Relatives: Jerzy Łukaszewicz (brother)

Olgierd Łukaszewicz (born 7 September 1946) is a Polish film actor. He has appeared in more than 60 films since his 1969 graduation from the Ludwik Solski Academy for the Dramatic Arts in Kraków. Between 2002 and 2005, he was the President of the Polish Union of Stage Actors (Związek Artystów Scen Polskich).

== Selected filmography ==
- 1970: Salt of the Black Earth (Sól ziemi czarnej) as Gabriel Basista
- 1972: Pearl in the Crown (Perła w koronie) as Jaś
- 1972: The Wedding (Wesele) as Phantom
- 1977: The Story of Sin (Dzieje grzechu) as Zygmunt Szczerbic
- 1975: Nights and Days (Noce i dnie) as Janusz Ostrzeński
- 1978: Jörg Ratgeb – Painter as Bishop
- 1980: Głosy as Broniarek
- 1981: Fever (Gorączka: Dzieje jednego pocisku) as Marek
- 1982: Interrogation (Przesłuchanie) as Konstnty
- 1984: Sexmission (Seksmisja) as Albert Starski
- 1986: Boris Godunov as Mikolaj Czernikowski
- 1987: Magnat as Franzel
- 1987: Kingsajz as Paragraph
- 1988: A Short Film About Killing (Krótki film o zabijaniu) as Andrzej
- 1988: Alchemik as Sendivius
- 1988: Decalogue II & Decalogue V as Andrzej Geller
- 1994: Johnnie Waterman as Old man
- 2000: Keep Away from the Window (Daleko od okna) as Regina's emissary
- 2001: The Hexer (Wiedźmin) as Stregobor
- 2005: Karol: A Man Who Became Pope (Karol, un uomo diventato papa) as Karol Wojtyła’s father
- 2009: Generał Nil as General Emil “Nil” Fieldorf
- 2009: Było sobie miasteczko...

As voice actor:

- 1995: Rob Roy as Rob Roy MacGregor
- 1998: Rudolph the Red-Nosed Reindeer: The Movie
- 1999: Inspector Gadget as Sanford “Claw” Scolex
- 2000: The Adventures of Rocky and Bullwinkle as President Signoff
- 2005: Have No Fear: The Life of Pope John Paul II as Karol Wojtyła
- 2005: Pope John Paul II as Cardinal Adam Sapieha
- 2009: Copernicus' Star
- 2012: Frankenweenie as Mr. Rzykruski

== Selected medals ==
- Order of Polonia Restituta
- Cross of Merit (Poland)
- Officer's Cross of the Order of Merit of the Federal Republic of Germany
