= Man of Iron =

1981 film directed by Andrzej Wajda

- Polish: Człowiek z żelaza
- Directed by: Andrzej Wajda
- Written by: Aleksander Ścibor-Rylski
- Starring: Jerzy Radziwiłowicz; Krystyna Janda
- Cinematography: Edward Kłosiński
- Edited by: Halina Prugar-Ketling
- Distributed by: United Artists Classics
- Release date: 27 July 1981
- Running time: 153 minutes
- Country: Poland
- Language: Polish
- Box office: $492,035

Man of Iron (Polish: Człowiek z żelaza) is a 1981 film directed by Andrzej Wajda. It depicts the Solidarity labour movement and its first success in persuading the Polish government to recognize workers' right to an independent union.

The film continues the story of Maciej Tomczyk, the son of Mateusz Birkut, the protagonist of Wajda's earlier film, Man of Marble. Here, Maciej is a young worker involved in the anti-Communist labour movement, described as "the man who started the Gdańsk Shipyard strike", and a journalist working for the Communist regime's radio station, who is given the task of slandering Maciej. The young man is clearly intended as a parallel to Lech Wałęsa (who appears as himself in the movie).

Man of Iron clarifies the ending of Man of Marble, which left the death of Mateusz Birkut ambiguous. Man of Iron explicitly states that Mateusz was killed in clashes at the shipyards in 1970.

The film was made during the brief thaw in Communist censorship that appeared between the formation of Solidarity in August 1980 and its suppression in December 1981, and as such it is remarkably critical of the Communist regime. Because of this it was banned in 1981 by the Polish government. The film won the Palme d'Or and the Prize of the Ecumenical Jury at the 1981 Cannes Film Festival. It was also nominated for the Academy Award for Best Foreign Language Film. American filmmaker Martin Scorsese later recognized the film as one of the masterpieces of Polish cinema.

== Plot ==
Activist Maciek Tomczyk, the son of Man of Marble's hero Mateusz Birkut, is leading a shipyard strike in Gdańsk against the Communist authorities. An alcoholic radio journalist named Winkel is ordered by the deputy chairman of the Radio Committee to investigate Tomczyk and find compromising information about him. Winkel is sent to Gdańsk, where he is monitored by the authorities.

The strikers refuse to give Winkel access to the shipyard, but he meets a friend, Dzidek. Dzidek knew Tomczyk in college and later recounts how Tomczyk's father, Mateusz Birkut, would not allow his son to take part in the student protests in March 1968. From another source, Tomczyk learns that Birkut himself died during protests in December 1970. Winkel becomes increasingly sympathetic to the strikers' cause but continues his investigation under pressure from the authorities.

After his father's death, Tomczyk married Agnieszka, whom he had met when making a documentary about Birkut's career as a well-publicized Stakhanovite worker hero. Winkel visits Agnieszka, who is now in police custody for her support of the strike. Agnes describes her romance and marriage with Tomczyk and their fight for workers' rights.

Despite being blackmailed by the secret police for a drunk driving crash in his past, Winkel ultimately refuses to complete his assignment and resigns from his job. He is admitted to the shipyard, where he joins the strikers. A government delegation reaches an agreement with Lech Wałęsa and the other strikers, and Agnieszka tearfully reunites with Tomczyk during the announcement. A government official warns that the agreement is "only a piece of paper," but Tomczyk tells his father's memorial that the strikers have "made it through the worst."

== Cast ==
- Jerzy Radziwiłowicz - Maciej Tomczyk / Mateusz Birkut
- Krystyna Janda - Agnieszka
- Marian Opania - Winkel
- Irena Byrska - Mother Hulewicz
- Wiesława Kosmalska - Wiesława Hulewicz
- Bogusław Linda - Dzidek
- Franciszek Trzeciak - Badecki
- Janusz Gajos - deputy chairman of Radio Committee
- Andrzej Seweryn - Capt. Wirski
- Marek Kondrat - Grzenda
- Jan Tesarz - Szef
- Jerzy Trela - Antoniak
- Krzysztof Janczar - Kryska
- Krystyna Zachwatowicz - Hanka Tomczyk
- Bogusław Sobczuk - Redaktor TVP
- Lech Wałęsa - Himself
- Anna Walentynowicz - Herself

== Reception ==
American filmmaker Martin Scorsese recognized the film as one of the masterpieces of Polish cinema, selecting it in 2013 for screening alongside films such as Knife in the Water (1962), The Promised Land (1975), and director Andrzej Wajda's own Ashes and Diamonds (1958) and Innocent Sorcerers (1960) as part of the Martin Scorsese Presents: Masterpieces of Polish Cinema festival in the United States, Canada and United Kingdom.

== See also ==
- Walesa: Man of Hope, director Andrzej Wajda's 2013 biography of Lech Wałęsa himself
- List of submissions to the 54th Academy Awards for Best Foreign Language Film
- List of Polish submissions for the Academy Award for Best Foreign Language Film
