= Ewa Błaszczyk =

Polish actress (born 1955)

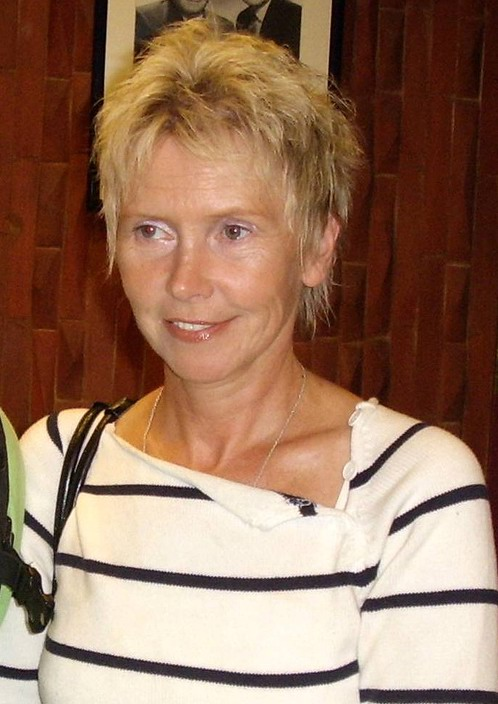
- Born: 15 October 1955 (age 70); Warsaw, Poland
- Years active: 1977–

Ewa Błaszczyk (born 15 October 1955) is a Polish actress. She has made over 35 appearances in film and television. She starred in Krzysztof Kieślowski's Dekalog: Nine and in the 1980s TV series Zmiennicy.
