= Cezary Żak =

Polish actor (born 1961)

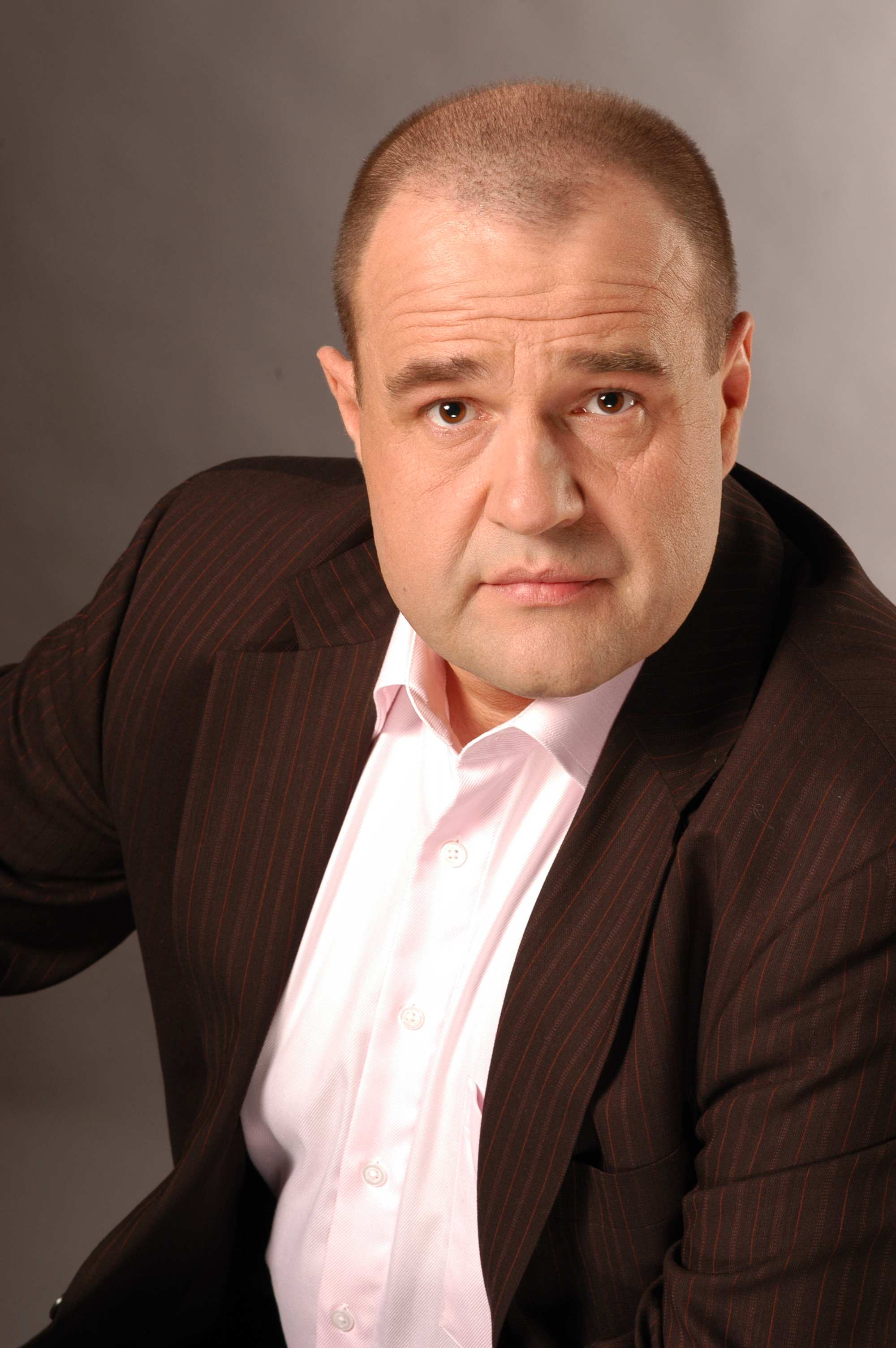
- Cezary Żak in 2008
- Born: 22 August 1961 (age 65); Brzeg Dolny, Poland
- Education: Ludwik Solski Academy for the Dramatic Arts
- Occupation: Actor
- Years active: 1986–present
- Television: Miodowe lata, Ranczo, and Ludzie Chudego
- Spouse: Katarzyna Żak
- Website: cezaryzak.com

Signature
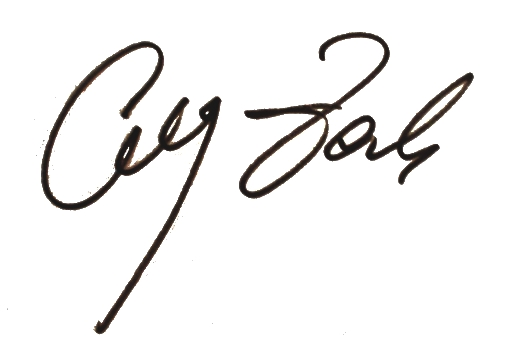

Cezary Żak (born on 22 August 1961) is a Polish actor, known for his roles in the television series Miodowe lata (The Honeymooners), Ranczo (where he unusually played two lead roles) and Ludzie Chudego (Chudy's People).

He is married to Polish actress Katarzyna Żak, with whom he has two daughters, Alexandra and Susanna. His cousin is satirist Tadeusz Drozda.

He is also the owner of a language school in Gliwice.

== Biography ==
In 1985 he graduated from the Ludwik Solski Academy for the Dramatic Arts in Wrocław. He made his theater debut on March 15, 1986 playing the role of social activist Stanisław Ignacy Witkiewicz in Panna Tutli Putli staged by the Wrocławski Teatr Współczesny (Wrocław Contemporary Theatre). In 1993 he was awarded the Society of Friends of the Theatre in Wroclaw for a young actor. In 1994, he received another award (award for Kontrabasistę dir. Susskind and trophy from the President of Toruń at the XXVIII National Theatre Festival for One Actor in Toruń).

During 1985-1986 and 1990-1995 he appeared at the Wrocław Contemporary Theatre, and from 1995-1996 at the Teatr im. Norwida in Jelenia Góra. From 1997 to 2006 he's been an actor at the Teatr Powszechny (Universal Theatre) in Warsaw. In the nineties, he hosted the game show Ace, Queen, Jack shown on the Polsat television network.

== Filmography ==
=== 1990s ===
- Sensacje XX wieku (TV) (1983-2005) as Hermann Göring
- Nagłe zawirowanie czyli most (1993)
- Czterdziestolatek 20 lat później (1993) as a chauffeur
- Magneto w Autrement (1993) as a priest
- Obcy musi fruwać (1993)
- Polska śmierć (1994)
- Cwał (1995)
- Daleko od siebie (1995) as a pathologist
- Gracze (1995) as the priest Jaworski
- Sobowtór (1995)
- Odwiedziny (1995)
- Wielka forsa (1995)
- Ostatni raz (1995)
- Maszyna zmian (1995) as a cop
- Matki, żony i kochanki (1995)
- Pułkownik Kwiatkowski (1995) as Lieutenant Brzóska
- The Secret of Sagal (TV) (1996)
- Ekstradycja (TV) (1996)
- Nocne graffiti (1996) as the captain of the guard
- Wirus (1996) as a scooter thief
- Odwiedź mnie we śnie (1996) as Garus
- Opowieści weekendowe: Słaba wiara|Słaba wiara (1996) as a driver
- Klan (TV) (1997-2006) as Józio
- Taekwondo (1997) as the owner of the restaurant
- Młode wilki 1/2 (1997) as a lawyer
- Musisz żyć (1997) as a psychologist
- Królowa złodziei (1997)
- Kroniki domowe (1997) as chairman
- Kiler (1997) as a barman
- Gniew (1997) as a cop
- Pułapka (1997)
- Prostytutki (1997) as the German
- Gwiezdny Pirat (TV) (1998) as Max Rajner
- 13 posterunek (TV) (1998) as a telephone lineman
- Miodowe lata (TV) (1998-2003) as Karol Krawczyk
- Niemcy (Germans) (1998) as an officer of the Gestapo
- Na dobre i na złe (For better and for worse) (TV) (1999-2006) as Roman Ziętek
- Tygrysy Europy (TV) (1999) as Mr Lolek
- Ajlawju (1999) as Rysiek
- Fuks (1999) as a taxi driver
- Świat według Kiepskich (TV special for a TV series) (1999/2000) as Karol Krawczyk
- Wszystkie pieniądze świata (1999) as Svoboda

=== 2000s ===
- Wielkie rzeczy: Sieć (2000) as a cable fitter
- Wielkie rzeczy: System (2000) as a cable fitter
- Słoneczna włócznia (2001) as mayor
- Garderoba damska (2001) as a man
- Day of the Wacko (2002) as a dentist
- Zemsta (2002) as a chef Perełka
- Kasia i Tomek (TV) (2002-2003) as Marcin, a friend of Tomek's from years ago
- Zróbmy sobie wnuka (2003)
- Dziupla Cezara (TV) (2004) as Karol Krawczyk
- Pensjonat pod Różą (TV) (2004-2006)
- Całkiem nowe lata miodowe (TV - a continuation of Miodowe lata) (2004) as Karol Krawczyk
- Sublokatorzy (2004) as the priest Marian
- RajUstopy (2005) as Piotr
- My baby (2006)
- Wszyscy jesteśmy Chrystusami (2006) as a paramedic
- Oficerowie (2006) as Rysio, TV producer Max
- Czeka na nas świat (2006) as a rich man
- Ranczo (TV) (2006 - 2016) two different roles as a priest, and his brother the mayor
- Tajemnica twierdzy szyfrów (TV) (2007) as Harry Sauer
- Halo Hans! (TV) (2007) as Colonel Jabłuszenko
- Ranczo Wilkowyje (2007) (film based on the TV series Ranczo) two different roles as a priest, and his brother the mayor
- Trzeci oficer (TV) (2008) as producer

=== 2010s ===
- Ciacho (2010)
- Ludzie Chudego (TV) (2010-2011) as Commissioner Tadeusz Skinny Chudziszewski
- Hotel 52 (TV) (2012) as Lesław

=== 2020s ===
- The Doll (2026)
- Santo Subito! (TBA)

=== Polish dubbing ===
- Kajko i Kokosz (2005) as Kokosz (voice)
- Stefan Malutki (2006) as Stefan Malutki
- Garfield: Festyn humoru (2008) as Garfield
- WALL-E (2008) as the Captain
- Załoga G (2009) as Ben
- Garfield: Koty górą (2009) as Garfield
- Shrek Forever (2010) as Pichcik
- Mniam! (2011)
- Żółwik Sammy 2 (2012) as Filip
- Rycerz Blaszka. Pogromca smoków (2013) as Kelwin Popiołek
- Legends of Oz: Dorothy's Return (2014) as Sowa Mądralek
