= Mirosław Baka =

Polish actor

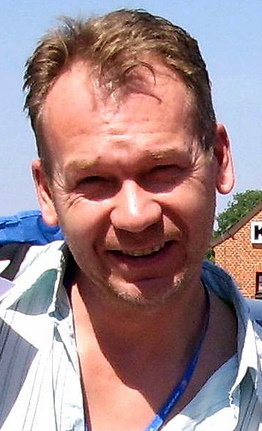
- Born: 15 December 1963 (age 61); Ostrowiec, Świętokrzyskie Voivodeship, Poland
- Citizenship: Polish
- Occupation: an actor
- Spouse: Joanna Kreft-Baka

Mirosław Michał Baka (born 15 December 1963 in Ostrowiec Świętokrzyski) is a Polish actor. One of his best-known roles is Jacek in A Short Film About Killing (1988) directed by Krzysztof Kieślowski. He also appeared in the comedy television series Bao-Bab, czyli zielono mi in 2003.
