= Krzysztof Globisz =

Polish actor (born 1957)

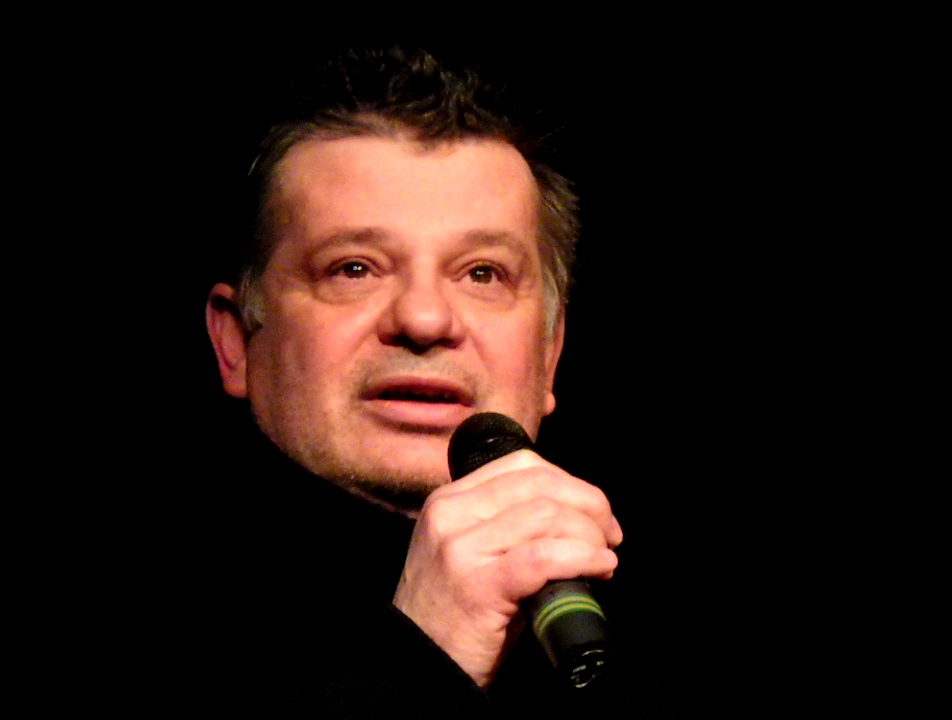
- Krzysztof Globisz in 2013
- Born: 16 January 1957 (age 69); Siemianowice Śląskie, Poland
- Occupation: Actor
- Years active: 1980–present

Krzysztof Maria Globisz (born 16 January 1957) is a Polish theatre and film actor.

== Biography ==
He has been an actor of the National Old Theatre in Kraków since 1981. He has been a dean of the Acting Faculty (2002–2005) and vice-rector (2005–2012) of the Państwowa Wyższa Szkoła Teatralna in Kraków (PWST). In 2014 he suffered a stroke which resulted in aphasia.

His first marriage ended up in divorce. Then he married Agnieszka. They had two sons: Krzysztof (born 1989) and Jan (born 1996).

== Filmography ==
Source.

- Danton (1982) as Amar
- Tętno (1985; TV film) as Adolf Poświatowski, Halina's husband
- A Short Film About Killing (1988) as Piotr Balicki, the newly qualified barrister whose opinion of capital punishment undergoes a radical change
- Crimen (1988; TV series) as Wasyl, Nastka's husband, episodes 4–6
- All That Really Matters (1992) as Aleksander Wat
- Tylko strach (1993) as Tomek
- Balanga (1993) as teacher's neighbour
- Colonel Kwiatkowski (1995) as Mieczysław Moczar
- Sir Thaddeus (1999) as Major Płut
- Anioł w Krakowie (2002) as angel Giordano
- Pora umierać (2007) as Witek Walter
- Czas honoru (2008–2010; TV series) as Leon Sajkowski, series 1 to 3
- Stones for the Rampart (2014) as Józef Zawadzki, father of "Zośka"
- Performer (2015)
- I'm a Killer (2016) as actor at a meeting with the First Secretary
- Leśniczówka (2021; TV series) as Piotr Melech, episodes 328, 329, 330, 337, 339, 340, 341
- Republika dzieci (2021; also 2022 TV series under the same title)
- Prawdziwe życie aniołów (2022) as Adam
- Sny pełne dymu (2023)

== Awards ==
- Knight's Cross of the Order of Polonia Restituta (2004)
