= Piotr Machalica =

Polish actor (1955–2020)

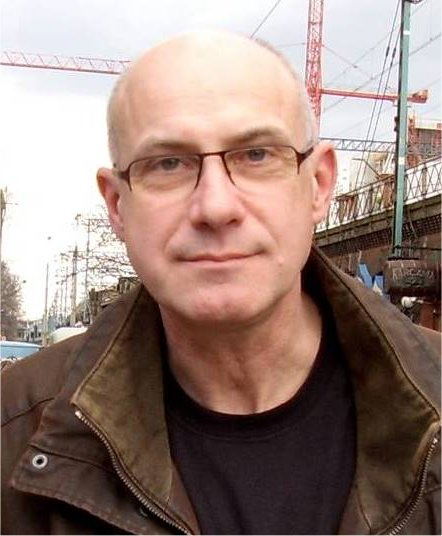
- Piotr Machalica
- Born: 13 February 1955; Pszczyna, Polish People's Republic
- Died: 14 December 2020 (aged 65); Warsaw, Poland
- Occupation: Actor

Piotr Machalica (13 February 1955 – 14 December 2020) was a Polish theatrical and cinematic actor.

== Biography ==
Machalica was born into a family of actors. His father, Henryk Machalica and his brother, Aleksander Machalica were both actors. Machalica had two children with his first wife Małgorzata Machalica, Sonia and Franciszek, before the couple divorced. He then dated actress Edyta Olszówka for a time before he married Aleksandra Sosnowska on 19 September 2020.

Machalica finished his studies at the Aleksander Zelwerowicz National Academy of Dramatic Arts in Warsaw in 1981. He first began acting in productions at the Teatr Powszechny w Warszawie. He also embarked on a short singing career and received an award at the 1986 National Festival of Polish Song in Opole. He notably sang songs by Bulat Okudzhava and Georges Brassens. From 2006 to 2018, he served as artistic director of the Teatr im. Adama Mickiewicza w Częstochowie.

In 2013, Machalica underwent a life-saving heart operation. He died from COVID-19 in Warsaw on 14 December 2020, at the age of 65, during the COVID-19 pandemic in Poland.

== Filmography ==
- Rycerz (1979)
- Medium (1985)
- Zabij mnie glino (1987)
- Dekalog 9 (1988)
- A Short Film About Love (1988)
- Maria Curie (1990)
- Polish Legends (2015) as Rokita
- The Please Principle (2019)

== Discography ==
=== Solo ===
- Portret muzyczny: Brassens i Okudżawa (2002)
- Moje chmury płyną nisko (2012)
- Piaskownica (2015)
- Mój ulubiony Młynarski (2019)

=== Duo ===
- Kuba Blokesz (2015)
