= Krzysztof Piesiewicz =

Polish lawyer, screenwriter and politician (1945–2026)

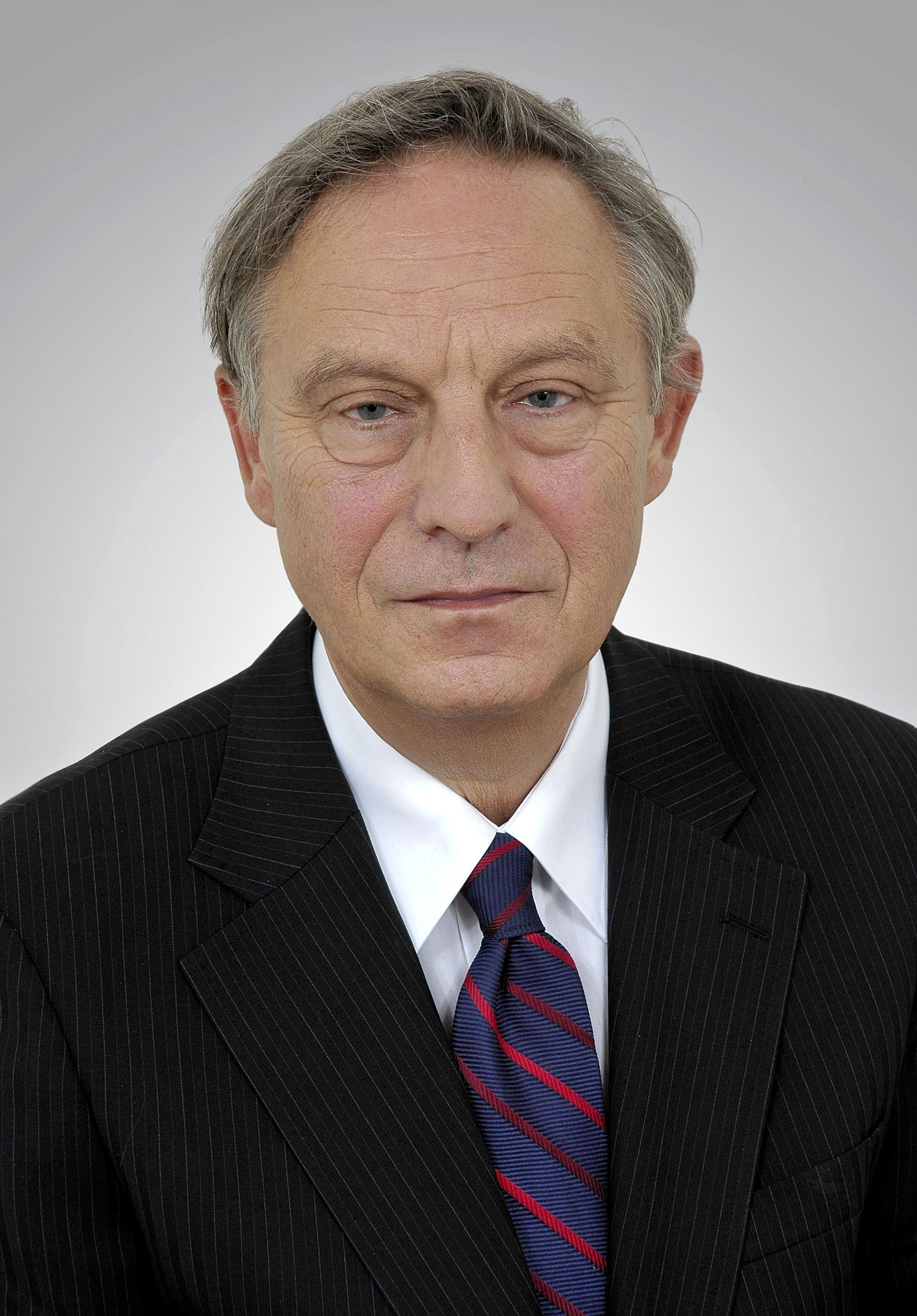
- Piesiewicz in 2010
- Born: 25 October 1945; Warsaw, Poland
- Died: 14 May 2026 (aged 80)
- Education: Warsaw University
- Occupations: Lawyer, screenwriter, politician
- Known for: Prosecution of the murderers of Father Jerzy Popiełuszko during the Toruń trial artistic collaboration with Krzysztof Kieślowski

Krzysztof Marek Piesiewicz (Polish pronunciation: [ˈkʂɨʂtɔf pjɛˈɕɛvit͡ʂ]; 25 October 1945 – 14 May 2026) was a Polish lawyer, politician and film screenwriter. From 1991 to 1993 and from 1997 to 2011 he was a member of Polish Senate. Piesiewicz was the head of the Social Movement (RS) or Social Movement Party.

== Early life and career in law and film ==
Piesiewicz studied law at Warsaw University and began practicing in 1973. Through the late 1970s he became increasingly involved in political cases, defending opponents of the Communist regime of the Polish People's Republic, serving as a legal advisor for Solidarity and assisting in the successful prosecution of the murderers of Jerzy Popiełuszko.

In 1982, he met the film director Krzysztof Kieślowski, who was planning to direct a documentary on political show trials in Poland under martial law. Piesiewicz agreed to help, though he doubted whether an accurate film could be made within the constraints of the judicial system; indeed, the filmmakers found that their presence in court seemed to be affecting the outcomes of cases, often improving the prospects of the accused, but making it hard to capture judicial abuses.

Kieślowski decided to explore the issue through fiction instead, and the two collaborated for the first time as writers on the feature film No End, released in 1984.

Piesewicz returned to his law career, but remained in touch with Kieślowski and three years later persuaded him to create a series of films based on the Ten Commandments. This series, Dekalog, explored the filmmakers' mutual interest in moral and ethical dilemmas in contemporary social and political life, and achieved (belated) critical acclaim around the world.

Their later collaborations, The Double Life of Véronique and Three Colours (Blue, White, Red), focused on metaphysical questions of personal choice and appeared relatively apolitical, though the latter series was based on Piesiewicz's idea of dramatizing the French political ideals of liberty, equality, and fraternity in the same way they had previously dramatized the Ten Commandments.

He was credited as co-writer on all of Kieślowski's projects after No End, the last of which was Hope in 2007, directed by Stanislaw Mucha after Kieślowski's death. He also wrote Silence, which was directed by Michał Rosa and released in 2001.

== Career in politics ==
Piesiewicz's career in electoral politics began in 1989, when he began working in the Social Movement for Solidarity Electoral Action (RS AWS) party, originally the political wing of the Solidarity union and the leading party in the center-right AWS coalition. In 1991 he was elected to the Polish Senate, served for two years, then returned in 1997. In 2002, RS AWS changed its name to RS and elected Piesiewicz as its leader; he officiated until the dissolution of the party in 2004. From 2005 to 2009, Piesiewicz belonged to Platforma Obywatelska's club in the Senate, but did not belong to the party itself. In 2011 he did not run for reelection.

He was described as having "lobbied hard against capital punishment, writing countless articles in the Polish press".

== Personal life and death ==
Piesiewicz was married to Maria, but later. He was Roman Catholic. Piesiewicz died on 14 May 2026, at the age of 80.

== See also ==
- A Short Film About Killing
- Dekalog: Five
