= List of Polish films of the 1990s =

List of films produced in the Cinema of Poland in the 1990s.

Title	Director	Cast	Genre	Notes
1990
The Bet	Teresa Kotlarczyk			Entered into the 17th Moscow International Film Festival
Burial of a Potato	Jan Jakub Kolski			Screened at the 1991 Cannes Film Festival
Escape from the 'Liberty' Cinema	Wojciech Marczewski			Screened at the 1991 Cannes Film Festival
Korczak	Andrzej Wajda	Wojciech Pszoniak		Screened at the 1990 Cannes Film Festival
1991
Calls Controlled	Sylwester Chęciński	Stanisław Tym, Krzysztof Kowalewski	Black Comedy	
Diabły, diabły	Dorota Kędzierzawska			
Europa Europa	Agnieszka Holland	Marco Hofschneider, Julie Delpy		
The Double Life of Véronique	Krzysztof Kieślowski	Irène Jacob		Won three awards at Cannes: Prize of the Ecumenical Jury (Krzysztof Kieślowski), FIPRESCI Prize (Krzysztof Kieślowski) and Best Actress (Irène Jacob)
1992
A Bachelor's Life Abroad	Andrzej Barański			Entered into the 18th Moscow International Film Festival
All That Really Matters	Robert Gliński			
Just Beyond That Forest	Jan Łomnicki	Ryszarda Hanin, Joanna Friedman, Marta Klubowicz, Marzena Trybała, Marek Bargielowski, Bogusław Sochnacki	War	
Warszawa. Année 5703	Janusz Kijowski	Lambert Wilson, Julie Delpy, Hanna Schygulla		Polish-French-German co-production
1993
Three Colours: Blue	Krzysztof Kieślowski	Juliette Binoche, Benoît Régent, Emmanuelle Riva	Drama	Polish-French-Swiss co-production 1993 Venice Film Festival: Best Film, Best Actress (Juliette Binoche), Best Cinematography (Sławomir Idziak) 1993 César Award : Best Actress (Juliette Binoche), Best Sound, Best Film Editing
Two Moons	Andrzej Barański			Based on 1930 novel by Maria Kuncewiczowa
1994
Johnnie Waterman	Jan Jakub Kolski			Screened at the 1994 Cannes Film Festival
Reverted	Kazimierz Kutz			Entered into the 19th Moscow International Film Festival
Three Colours: Red	Krzysztof Kieślowski	Irène Jacob	Drama	Polish-French-Swiss co-production Entered into the 1994 Cannes Film Festival
Three Colors: White	Krzysztof Kieślowski	Zbigniew Zamachowski, Julie Delpy	Drama	Polish-French-Swiss co-production Silver Bear for Best Director at the 44th Berlin International Film Festival in 1994
Wrony	Dorota Kędzierzawska			
Śmierć jak kromka chleba	Kazimierz Kutz		Drama, History	
1995
Argument About Basia	Kazimierz Tarnas	Paulina Tworzyańska		
Holy Week	Andrzej Wajda			Entered into the 46th Berlin International Film Festival
Polish Death	Waldemar Krzystek	Cezary Pazura, Agnieszka Pilaszewska, Jan Machulski, Henryk Bista, Igor Przegrodzki		
Szczur	Jan Łomnicki		Drama	
1996
At Full Gallop	Krzysztof Zanussi			Screened at the 1996 Cannes Film Festival
Miss Nobody	Andrzej Wajda			Entered into the 47th Berlin International Film Festival
Szamanka	Andrzej Żuławski		Drama	
1997
Bandyta	Maciej Dejczer	Til Schweiger, John Hurt		
Kiler	Juliusz Machulski			
Love Stories	Jerzy Stuhr			
A Trap	Adek Drabiński			Entered into the 20th Moscow International Film Festival
1998
Fotoamator	Dariusz Jabłoński		Documentary	
Nic	Dorota Kędzierzawska			
1999
The Debt	Krzysztof Krauze	Robert Gonera, Jacek Borcuch, Andrzej Chyra, Cezary Kosiński, Agnieszka Warchulska	Drama	
Kiler-ów 2-óch	Juliusz Machulski	Cezary Pazura	Action, drama-comedy	
