= Piotr Lenar =

Polish cinematographer

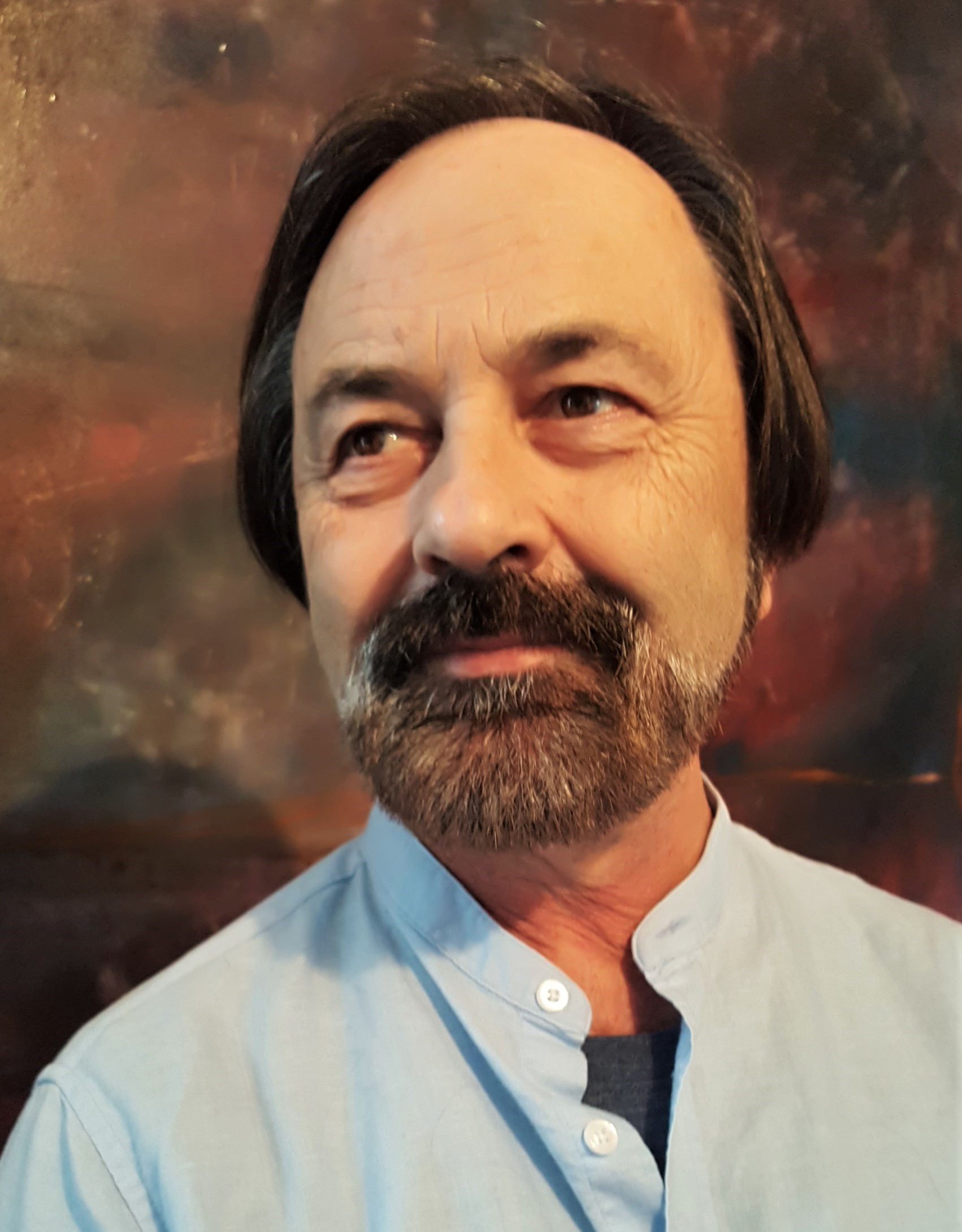
2023 Image of Piotr Lenar

Piotr Lenar (born 13 March 1958 in Kraków) is a Polish cinematographer, a member of the European Film Academy, Polish Society of Cinematographers (PSC) and the Berufsverband Kinematograph (BVK).

Piotr Lenar graduated National Film School in Łódź in 1987. He cooperated with Jan Jakub Kolski. The result of their common work is Johnnie Waterman (1993) – one of the most important Polish films of the 90's.

From 1989 to 2010 Lenar lived and worked in Germany. He collaborated with artists such as Urs Odermatt, Thomas Jahn, Dieter Wedel and Lenhard Fritz Krawinkel. He also worked in the United States with Michael F. Huse. In 2010, he became the founder and CO of a private film school – AMA Film School – in Kraków.

== Filmography ==
- 2014: Serce Serduszko, directed by Jan Jakub Kolski
- 2009: Milion Dolarow, directed by Janusz Kondratiuk
- 2008: Klinik am Alex, directed by Roland Suso Richter, Uli Möller
- 2007: Pitbull (TV series), directed by Kasia Adamik, Xawery Żuławski, Greg Zgliński
- 2006: Pitbull, directed by Patryk Vega
- 2005: Papa und Mama, directed by Dieter Wedel.
- 2005: Fredo, directed by Cecilia Malmström.
- 2005: Kryminalni, directed by Patryk Vega, Piotr Wereśniak.
- 2004: Coffee Beans for a Life, directed by Helga Hirsch.
- 2003: Leipzig Homicide – Die Tote aus Riga, directed by Patrick Winczewski.
- 2003: Sabine!, directed by Patrick Winczewski.
- 2003: Ihr schwerster Fall, directed by Patrick Winczewski.
- 2002: Balko, directed by Uli Möller, Thomas Jahn.
- 2001: Verrückt nach Paris, directed by Eike Besuden, Pago Balke.
- 2000: Cały ten zgiełk, directed by Piotr Lenar.
- 1999: Sumo Bruno, directed by Lenard Fritz Krawinkel.
- 1998: Jets, directed by Klaus Witting.
- 1998: Kai Rabe gegen die Vatikankiller, directed by Thomas Jahn.
- 1998: Tatort – Ein Hauch von Hollywood, directed by Urs Odermatt.
- 1997: Herzbeben, directed by Thomas Jahn.
- 1996: Die Story von Monty Spinnerratz, directed by Michael F. Huse.
- 1996: Zerrissene Herzen, directed by Urs Odermatt.
- 1995: Szabla od komendanta, directed by Jan Jakub Kolski.
- 1995: Exclusion, directed by Hans Peter Clahsen, Michael F. Huse.
- 1994: Kalter Krieg, directed by Erika Fehse.
- 1994: Der Koffer, directed by Stefan Julian Neuschaefer.
- 1994: Grajacy z talerza, directed by Jan Jakub Kolski.
- 1993: Can und Oleg, directed by Yasemin Akai.
- 1993: Die Schlafwandlerin, directed by Stefan Julian Neuschaefer.
- 1993: Cudowne miejsce, directed by Jan Jakub Kolski.
- 1993: Jańcio Wodnik, directed by Jan Jan Kolski.
- 1992: Magneto, directed by Jan Jakub Kolski.
- 1992: Moje drzewko Pomarańczowe, directed by Dorota Kędzierzawska.
- 1992: Pograbek, directed by Jan Jakub Kolski.
- 1991: Si Mustafa, directed by Erika Fahse.
- 1990: Im Westen alles nach Plan, directed by Hans Peter Clahsen, Michael F. Huse.
- 1988: Jemiola, directed by Wanda Różycka.
- 1987: Idz, directed by Grzegorz Królikiewicz.
- 1986: Słowiański świt, directed by Jan Jakub Kolski.
