= The Woodpecker =

1971 film by Jerzy Gruza

Dzięcioł
- Directed by: Jerzy Gruza
- Written by: [erzy Gruza, Krzysztof Teodor Toeplitz
- Starring: Wiesław Gołas; Violetta Villas; Alina Janowska; Joanna Jędryka; Helena Bystrzanowska; Kazimierz Rudzki; Adam Pawlikowski
- Music by: Henryk Kuźniak, Juliusz Loranc
- Release date: 1971
- Running time: 85 minutes
- Country: Poland
- Language: Polish

Dzięcioł (English: The Woodpecker) is a Polish comedy movie released in 1971. The movie was directed by Jerzy Gruza.

== Cast ==
- Wiesław Gołas as Stefan Walder
- Wiesław Michnikowski as Warsaw citizen
- Irena Kwiatkowska as Nurse
- Alina Janowska as Miśka, as Stefan's wife
- Joanna Jędryka as Irena, Stefan's friend
- Helena Bystrzanowska as Klara, Irena's aunt
- Kazimierz Rudzki as Doctor in the shop
- Adam Pawlikowski as Thief in the shop and party
- Alfred Łodziński as Seweryn, father of Irena
- Viloetta Villas as Madam Tylska
- Zdzisław Maklakiewicz as Zdzisław
- Władysław Hańcza as Maksymilian
- Ewa Krzyżewska as Woman in Warsaw
