= Adam Ferency =

Polish actor

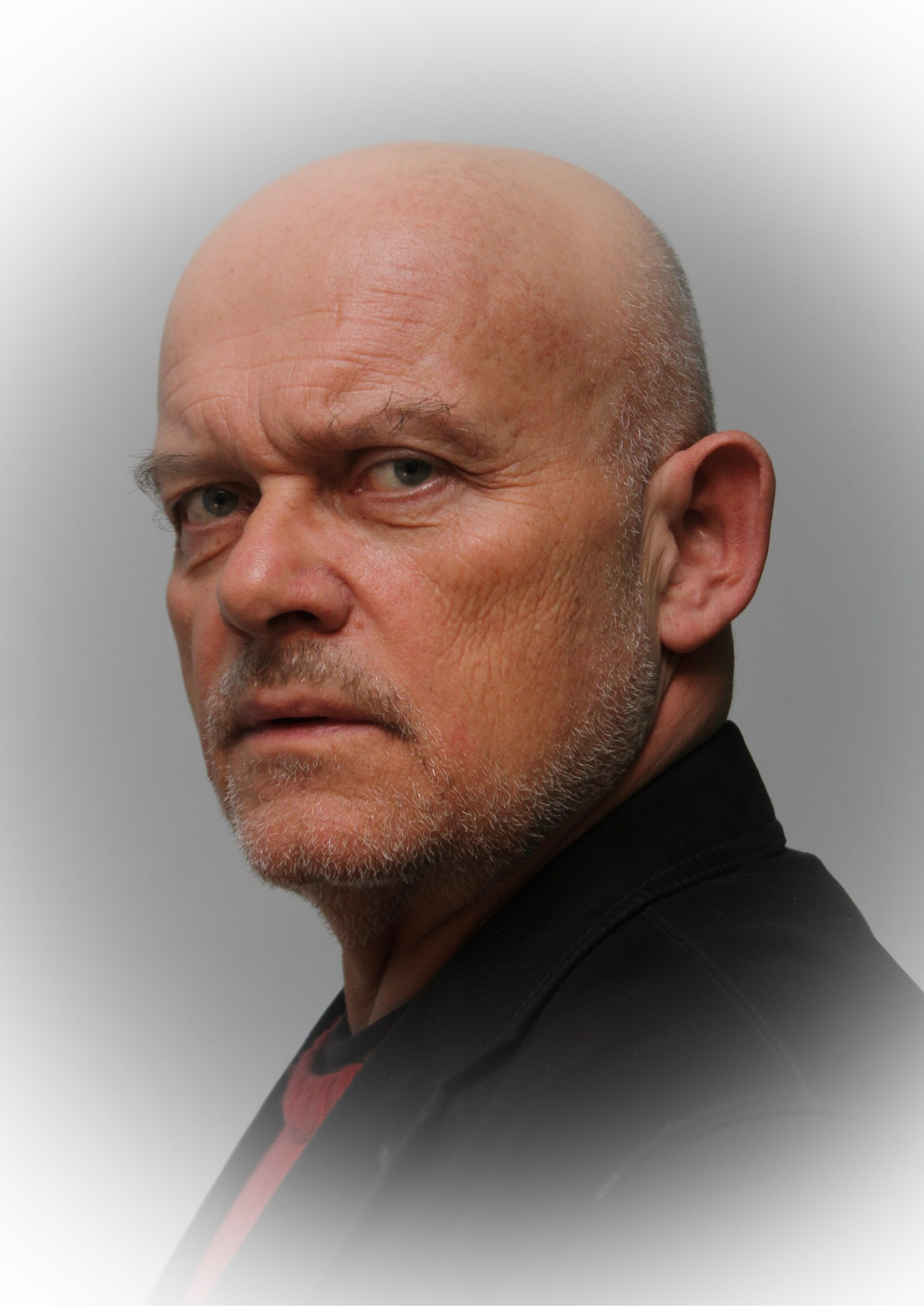
- Born: 5 October 1951 (age 74); Warsaw, Poland
- Education: National Academy of Dramatic Art in Warsaw
- Occupation: Actor
- Years active: 1976–present

Adam Ferency (born 5 October 1951) is a Polish actor. He has appeared in more than 70 films and television shows since 1976. He starred in the 1990 film Burial of a Potato, which was screened in the Un Certain Regard section at the 1991 Cannes Film Festival.

== Selected filmography ==
- Blind Chance (1981)
- Fever (1981)
- Interrogation (1982)
- The Mother of Kings (1987)
- Burial of a Potato (1990)
- Conversation with a Cupboard Man (1993)
- With Fire and Sword (1999)
- Pornografia (2003)
- 80 Million (2011)
- Battle of Warsaw 1920 (2011)
- Cold War (2018)
- The Defense (2021–22)
- Prorok (2022)
- Inheritance (2024)

== See also ==
- Cinema of Poland
- List of Poles
