= Bogusław Sochnacki =

Polish actor

- Born: 14 October 1930; Katowice, Poland
- Died: 26 July 2004 (aged 73); Lódz, Poland
- Occupation: Actor
- Years active: 1950–2003

Bogusław Sochnacki (14 October 1930 – 26 July 2004) was a Polish actor. He appeared in more than 100 films and television shows between 1950 and 2003.

== Selected filmography ==
- Dwie brygady (1950) - Young Actor (uncredited)
- Wolne miasto (1958) - German in Bar (uncredited)
- Zolnierz królowej Madagaskaru (1958) - Man in beer local (uncredited)
- Miasteczko (1960) - Man in Suit
- Walet pikowy (1960)
- Milczace slady (1961) - Soldier (uncredited)
- Komedianty (1962)
- Troje i las (1963) - Maniek Sawicki
- Passenger (1963) - German Soldier (uncredited)
- Yokmok (1963)
- Przygoda noworoczna (1963) - Stefan
- Gdzie jest general... (1964) - German Soldier
- Ranny w lesie (1964) - Alleged Spy (uncredited)
- Spotkanie ze szpiegiem (1964) - Agent on the Truck (voice, uncredited)
- Pięciu (1964) - Rysiek
- The Saragossa Manuscript (1965) - Senor Zoto
- Zycie raz jeszcze (1965) - Partisan (uncredited)
- Glos ma prokurator (1965)
- The Ashes (1965) - Polish Soldier
- Niedziela sprawiedliwosci (1966) - Broda
- Don Gabriel (1966) - Sergeant of the Legion
- Westerplatte (1967) - Sgt. Józef Lopatniuk (uncredited)
- The Nutcracker (1967) - Piekarz (Baker)
- Stawka większa niż życie (1967, TV Series) - 'Wolf' Zajac
- Rzeczpospolita babska (1967) - Sergeant
- Tylko umarly odpowie (1969) - Sgt. Franciszek Klosek
- Dzien oczyszczenia (1970) - Herbert
- Album polski (1970) - Looter
- Romantyczni (1970) - Policeman
- Slonce wschodzi raz na dzien (1972) - Waliczek (uncredited)
- Na wylot (1973) - Man Reading the Sentence (voice, uncredited)
- Hubal (1973) - Gestapo Officer
- Zazdrosc i medycyna (1973) - Izaak Gold
- Pójdziesz ponad sadem (1974) - Windziarz
- The Story of Sin (1975) - Grosglück
- Koniec wakacji (1975) - Nauczyciel (voice, uncredited)
- Dzieje grzechu (1975)
- Czerwone i biale (1975)
- Nights and Days (1975) - Roman Katelba
- Kazimierz Wielki (1976)
- Czerwone ciernie (1977) - Hunter
- Gdzie woda czysta i trawa zielona (1977)
- Okragly tydzien (1977) - King (voice, uncredited)
- Pokój z widokiem na morze (1978) - Strazak
- Nie zaznasz spokoju (1978) - Bozena's father (voice)
- Pogrzeb swierszcza (1978) - Broniewicz
- Plomienie (1979) - Edward
- Bialy mazur (1979) - General (uncredited)
- Aria dla atlety (1979) - Abs (voice, uncredited)
- Zamach stanu (1980) - Minister
- The Quack (1982) - Szynkarz
- Limuzyna Daimler-Benz (1982) - Counter-Intelligence Agent
- Boldyn (1982) - Wanadek
- Karabiny (1982) - Chaplain (uncredited)
- Byl jazz (1983) - Dean
- Epitafium dla Barbary Radziwiłłówny (1983) - Mikolaj Radziwill 'Rudy' brat Barbary
- Co dzien blizej nieba (1984) - Militia captain
- Soból i panna (1984) - Forester Czerwinski
- Katastrofa w Gibraltarze (1984) - Józef W. Stalin
- Wedle wyroków twoich... (1984)
- Nie bylo slonca tej wiosny (1984)
- Czas dojrzewania (1984) - Romek's Father
- Przemytnicy (1985)
- Kobieta z prowincji (1985) - Andzia's Boss
- Mokry szmal (1986) - Spec (voice, uncredited)
- The Faithful River (1987) - Wachmistrz
- Labedzi spiew (1988) - Police Officer
- Republika nadziei (1988) - German colonel
- Kolory kochania (1988) - Suchaj
- Ballada o Januszku (1988, TV Series) - Marian Owocny
- Alchemik (1989) - Kalsken
- Gorzka milosc (1990) - Wydra
- Burial of a Potato (1990) - Mazurek
- Kanalia (1991) - Janitor
- Just Beyond This Forest (1991) - German Soldier Hans
- Skarga (1991) - SB man in hospital
- Zycie za zycie. Maksymilian Kolbe (1991) - Neighbor
- Listopad (1992) - Neighbor
- A Bachelor's Life Abroad (1992) - Foreman Schulz
- Kamien na kamieniu (1995) - Chmiel
- Deborah (1995) - Shopkeeper Rotman
- Dzieje mistrza Twardowskiego (1996) - Burgher
- Szabla od komendanta (1996) - Pan komendant
- Poznań '56 (1996) - Old Darek (voice, uncredited)
- Dzien wielkiej ryby (1997) - Priest
- Syzyfowe prace (2000)
- Oczywiscie, ze Milosc (2002) - Stary straznik
- Zróbmy sobie wnuka (2003) - Antoni
