= Bartosz Opania =

Polish actor (born 1970)

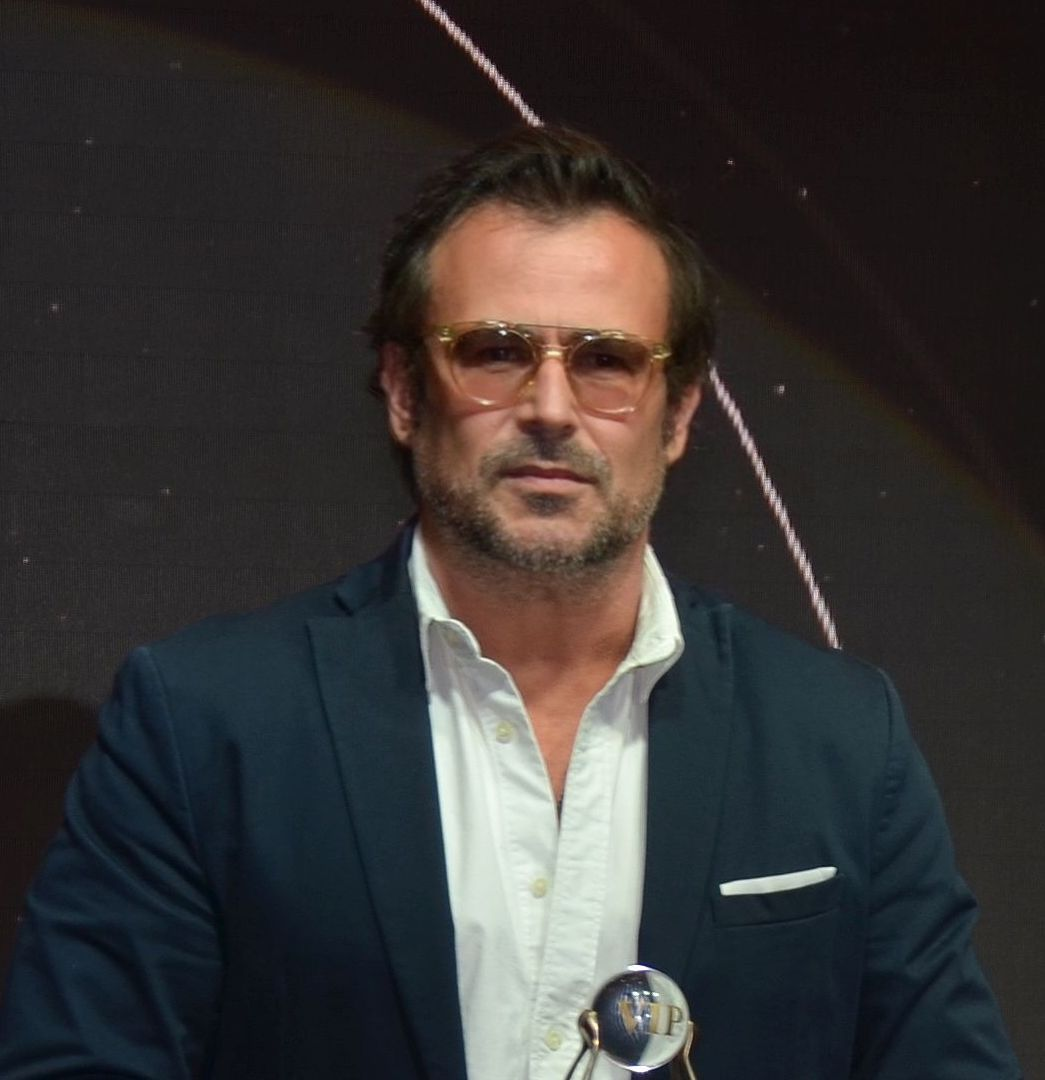
- Bartosz Opania, 2021
- Born: 6 December 1970 (age 55); Puławy, Poland
- Occupation: Actor
- Years active: 1992–present
- Spouse: Agnieszka Opania

Bartosz Opania (born 6 December 1970, Puławy) is a Polish film, television and theatre actor.

== Life and career ==
He was born on 6 December 1970 in Puławy to father Marian Opania and mother Anna. He played his first roles in Jacek Bromski's political thriller 1969. Szczęśliwego Nowego Roku (1969. Happy New Year) alongside Krzysztof Kolberger and Piotr Machalica and Magdalena Łazarkiewicz's 1992 film Białe małżeństwo (White Marriage) starring Jan Englert and Jolanta Fraszyńska. In 1992, he also made his first TV appearance in Jacek Bromski's Kuchnia polska programme. In 1993, he graduated from the National Academy of Dramatic Art in Warsaw.

In 1993, he played a gay character in Piotr Łazarkiewicz's drama Pora na czarownice (The Time of the Witches). In 1994, he made his theatre debut playing in Witold Gombrowicz's Ivona, Princess of Burgundia at Warsaw's Ateneum Theatre.

In 1995, he starred in Krzysztof Zanussi's film Cwał and Kazimierz Kutz's political comedy Pułkownik Kwiatkowski (Colonel Kwiatkowski). For his portrayal of Józef Andryszek in Jan Jakub Kolski's 1998 film Historia kina w Popielawach (History of the Cinema in Popielawy), he received his first nomination for the Polish Film Award for Best Actor.

His other notable roles include films like Barbara Sass's Jak narkotyk (1999), Jan Jakub Kolski's Keep Away from the Window (2000) and Michał Rosa's Silence (2001). He also played in TV series such as Teraz albo nigdy! (2008) and Na dobre i na złe.

== Appearances in film and television ==
- 1992: Kuchnia polska as Jarek, Piotr's friend (episode 4)
- 1993: Białe małżeństwo as Beniamin
- 1993: Pora na czarownice as Bartek
- 1995: Pułkownik Kwiatkowski as a Home Army prisoner
- 1995: Cwał as stableman
- 1997: Taekwondo as young Pole
- 1997: Linia opóźniająca as Paweł
- 1998: Historia kina w Popielawach as Józef Andryszek I
- 1999: Jak narkotyk as Piotr Pawłowski/Jurek
- 2000: Keep Away from the Window as Jan
- 2000: A Very Christmas Story as Miki
- 2000: Zakochani as Mateusz
- 2001-2018: Na dobre i na złe as Witold Latoszek
- 2001: Cisza as Szymon
- 2001: Córka as Jan
- 2003: Sukces as Wiktor
- 2004: Cudownie ocalony as Witold
- 2006: Statyści as Romek
- 2007: Pitbull as Lejczak (episode 14)
- 2008−2009: Teraz albo nigdy! as Bartosz Wróblewski
- 2009: Pod wiatr nie popłynie słodki zapach kwiatów as Andrzej
- 2009: Blondynka as Selim Goraj
- 2010: Usta usta as Jarek (episode 24)
- 2011: Battle of Warsaw 1920 as pułkownik Bolesław Jaźwiński
- 2011: Głęboka woda as Karol Tomiak (episode 7)
- 2013: Prawo Agaty as Andrzej Król (episode 46)
- 2014: Wkręceni as Zenobiusz „Fikoł” Kozioł
- 2015: Wkręceni 2 as Zenobiusz „Fikoł” Kozioł
- 2017: Druga szansa as Maciej Leonetti (season 3, episodes 1, 2, 3, 4, 5)

== See also ==
- Polish cinema
- Polish Film Awards
