= Hydrozagadka =

1971 Polish film

- Directed by: Andrzej Kondratiuk
- Written by: Andrzej Bonarski; Andrzej Kondratiuk
- Produced by: Jerzy Rutowicz
- Starring: Józef Nowak; Wiesław Michnikowski; Roman Kłosowski; Zdzisław Maklakiewicz; Franciszek Pieczka
- Cinematography: Zygmunt Samosiuk
- Music by: Waldemar Kazanecki
- Release date: 30 April 1971
- Running time: 70 minutes
- Language: Polish

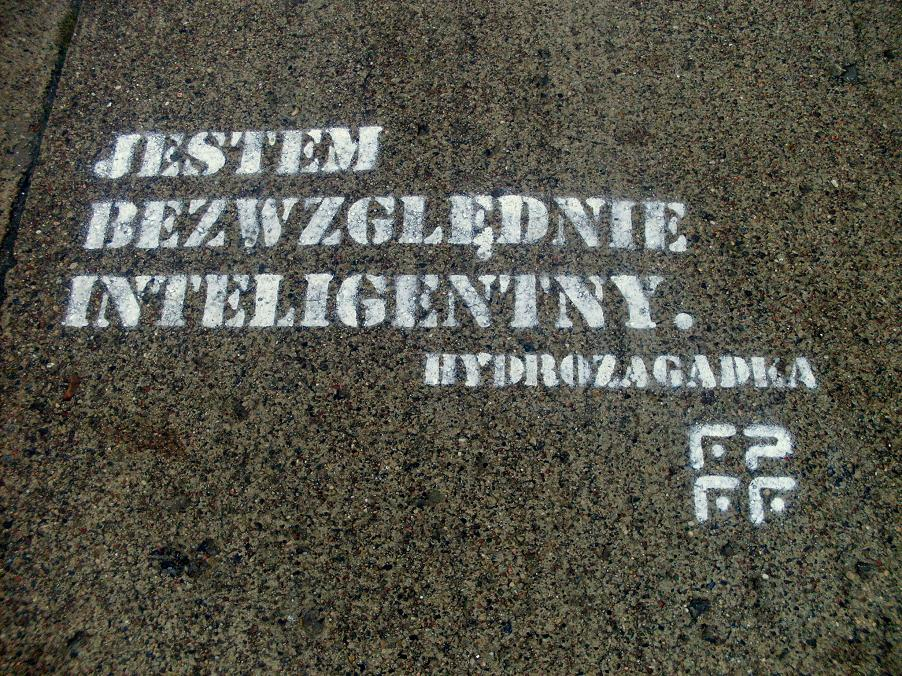
Quotation from film 'Hydrozagadka' advertising XXXIV Polish Film Festival in Gdynia 2009

Hydrozagadka is a Polish superhero comedy film.

The movie was ostensibly created as a Communist parody of the American ideals glorified in Superman and other superhero films, however Polish audiences instead felt that the film humorously parodied aspects of Polish life under Communist rule, such as the many slogans for a "better life."

Hydrozagadka premiered on 30 April 1971 on Polish television.

== Plot ==
During a summer heat wave, all the water in Warsaw is puzzlingly disappearing. Scientists secretly call upon As (Ace), a superhero who passes his days living as a mild-mannered engineer, to try to solve the mystery. It turns out that a mysterious Maharaja is in league with Doctor Spot to steal Poland's water and take it to the Maharaja's country.

== Cast ==
- Roman Kłosowski - Prince of Kabur
- Zdzisław Maklakiewicz - Dr. Spot
- Wiesław Michnikowski - Professor Milczarek
- Józef Nowak - Jan Walczak / Ace
- Iga Cembrzyńska - Woman in Bar
- Wiesława Mazurkiewicz - Florist
- Ewa Szykulska - Jola
- Jerzy Dobrowolski - Translator
- Jerzy Duszyński - Docent Frątczak
- Wiesław Gołas - Taxi Driver
- Bolesław Kamiński - The Little
- Czesław Lasota - Walczak's Friend
- Franciszek Pieczka - Sailor
- Wojciech Rajewski - Walczak's friend
- Jerzy Turek - crossing keeper
- Witold Skaruch - Walczak's friend
- Andrzej Kondratiuk - waggoner

== Crew ==
- Director - Andrzej Kondratiuk
- Writing credits - Andrzej Kondratiuk, Andrzej Bonarski
- Cinematography - Zygmunt Samosiuk
- Music - Waldemar Kazanecki
- Scenography - Jarosław Świtoniak
- Filmsetting - Jadwiga Zajicek
- Costumes - Joanna Radzka, Alicja Ptaszyńska
- Executive producer - Jerzy Rutowicz
