= Wierna rzeka =

Wierna rzeka may refer to:

- Wierna rzeka (1936 film)
- Wierna rzeka (1983 film)
