= Historia kina w Popielawach =

1998 Polish film

- Directed by: Jan Jakub Kolski
- Written by: Jan Jakub Kolski
- Produced by: Kazimierz Rozwałka
- Starring: Krzysztof Majchrzak; Bartosz Opania
- Cinematography: Krzysztof Ptak
- Edited by: Ewa Pakulska
- Music by: Zygmunt Konieczny
- Release date: November 20, 1998
- Running time: 90 minutes
- Country: Poland
- Language: Polish

Historia kina w Popielawach is a Polish historical film. It was released in 1998.

== Cast ==
- Krzysztof Majchrzak − Józef Andryszek Piąty
- Bartosz Opania − Józef Andryszek Pierwszy
- Grażyna Błęcka-Kolska − Chanutka Piąta
- Franciszek Pieczka - Janek
- Michał Jasiński − Józef Andryszek Szósty (Szóstek)
- Tomasz Krysiak − Staszek Szewczyk
- Andrzej Jurczak
- Joanna Orleańska − Chanutka I
- Izabella Bukowska − Jagoda

== Crew ==
Wojciech Saloni-Marczewski was a set designer.
