= The Saragossa Manuscript (film) =

- Directed by: Wojciech Jerzy Has
- Screenplay by: Tadeusz Kwiatkowski
- Based on: The Manuscript Found in Saragossa by Jan Potocki
- Produced by: Kamera Film Unit
- Starring: Zbigniew Cybulski; Iga Cembrzyńska; Joanna Jędryka
- Cinematography: Mieczysław Jahoda
- Edited by: Krystyna Komosińska
- Music by: Krzysztof Penderecki
- Distributed by: Film Polski
- Release date: 9 February 1965
- Running time: 182 minutes
- Country: Poland
- Language: Polish

The Saragossa Manuscript (Polish: Rękopis znaleziony w Saragossie, "The Manuscript found in Zaragoza") is a 1965 Polish film directed by Wojciech Has, based on the 1815 novel The Manuscript Found in Saragossa by Jan Potocki. Set primarily in Spain, it tells a frame story containing gothic, picaresque and erotic elements. In a deserted house during the Napoleonic Wars, two officers from opposing sides find a manuscript, which tells the tale of the Spanish officer's grandfather, Alphonso van Worden (Zbigniew Cybulski). Van Worden travelled in the region many years before, being plagued by evil spirits, and meeting such figures as a Qabalist and a Romani person, who tell him further stories, many of which intertwine and interrelate with one another.

The film was a relative success in Poland and other parts of socialist eastern Europe upon its release. It later also achieved a level of critical success in the United States, when filmmakers such as Martin Scorsese and Francis Ford Coppola rediscovered it and encouraged its propagation.

In the 2015 poll conducted by Polish Museum of Cinematography in Łódź, The Saragossa Manuscript came second on the list of the greatest Polish films of all time.

== Plot ==
During a battle in the Aragonese town of Saragossa (Zaragoza) during the Napoleonic Wars, an officer retreats to the second floor of an inn. He finds a large book with drawings of two men hanging on a gallows and two women in a bed. An enemy officer tries to arrest him but ends up translating the book for him; the second officer recognizes its author as his own grandfather, who was a captain in the Walloon Guard.

A flashback then recounts the tale of the ancestor, Alfonso van Worden, who appears with two servants, seeking the shortest route through the Sierra Morena Mountains. The two men warn him against taking his chosen route because it leads through haunted territory. At an apparently deserted inn, the Venta Quemada, he is invited to dine with two Moorish princesses, Emina and Zibelda, in a secret inner room. They inform the captain that they are his cousins and, as the last of the Gomelez line, he must marry them both to provide heirs. However, he must convert to Islam. He jokingly calls them ghosts, despite having told his servants with great bravado that ghosts do not exist. They seduce him and give him a skull goblet to drink from.

He wakes and finds himself back in the desolate countryside, lying next to a heap of skulls under a gallows. He meets a hermit priest who is trying to cure a possessed man; the latter tells his story, which also involves two sisters and a different kind of forbidden love. Alfonso sleeps in the hermitage's chapel, hearing strange voices at night.

When he wakes and rides off, he is captured by the Spanish Inquisition. He is rescued by the two princesses, aided by the gang of the Zoto brothers (two of whom had appeared dead on the ground near the gallows). Back in the inner room, the two princesses become amorous with Alfonso but they are interrupted by Sheikh Gomelez, who forces the captain at sword point to drink from the skull goblet.

Again Alfonso awakens at the gallows, but this time a cabalist is lying next to him. As they ride to the Cabalist's castle, they are joined by a skeptical mathematician, who remarks, "The human mind is ready to accept anything, if it is used knowingly." This ends part 1 of the film.

Part 2 is primarily filled with the nested tales told by the leader of a band of gypsies who visit the castle. "Frame story" or "tale-within-a-tale-within-a-tale" only begins to describe the complexity, because some of the inner tales intertwine, so that later tales shed new light on earlier experiences recounted by other characters. Multiple viewings of the film are recommended in order to comprehend the plot, as well as identify the appearance of certain characters before they are "introduced" by the gypsy raconteur to tell their own tales.

Finally, Alfonso is told to return to the Venta Quemada, where he meets the two princesses. They bid him farewell and the Sheikh gives him the large book so that he can write the end of his own story. The Sheikh explains that the whole adventure was a "game" designed to test Alfonso's character.

Alfonso wakes under the gallows again, but his two servants are nearby – it is as if they are about to begin the journey that he has just "dreamed". At the small inn in Saragossa, he writes in the large book until someone tells him that the two princesses are waiting for him. Laughing hysterically, he flings the book aside to the position it was found in the beginning of the film, and rides out to join the princesses.

== Cast ==
- Zbigniew Cybulski as Alfonse Van Worden
- Iga Cembrzyńska as Princess Emina
- Elżbieta Czyżewska as Donna Frasquetta Salero
- Gustaw Holoubek as Don Pedro Velasquez
- Beata Tyszkiewicz as Donna Rebecca Uzeda
- Joanna Jędryka as Princess Zibelda
- Bogumił Kobiela as Señor Toledo
- Zdzisław Maklakiewicz as Don Roque Busqueros
- Leon Niemczyk as Don Avadoro
- Barbara Krafftówna as Camilla de Tormez
- Stanislaw Igar as Don Gaspar Soarez
- Jan Machulski as Count Pena Flor
- Kazimierz Opaliński as Hermit / Sheikh
- Janusz Kłosiński as Don Diego Salero
- Slawomir Lindner as Van Worden's father
- Miroslawa Lombardo as Van Worden's mother
- Franciszek Pieczka as Pacheco
- Adam Pawlikowski as Don Pedro Uzeda
- Krzysztof Litwin as Don Lopez Soarez
- Jadwiga Krawczyk as Donna Inez Moro

== Production ==
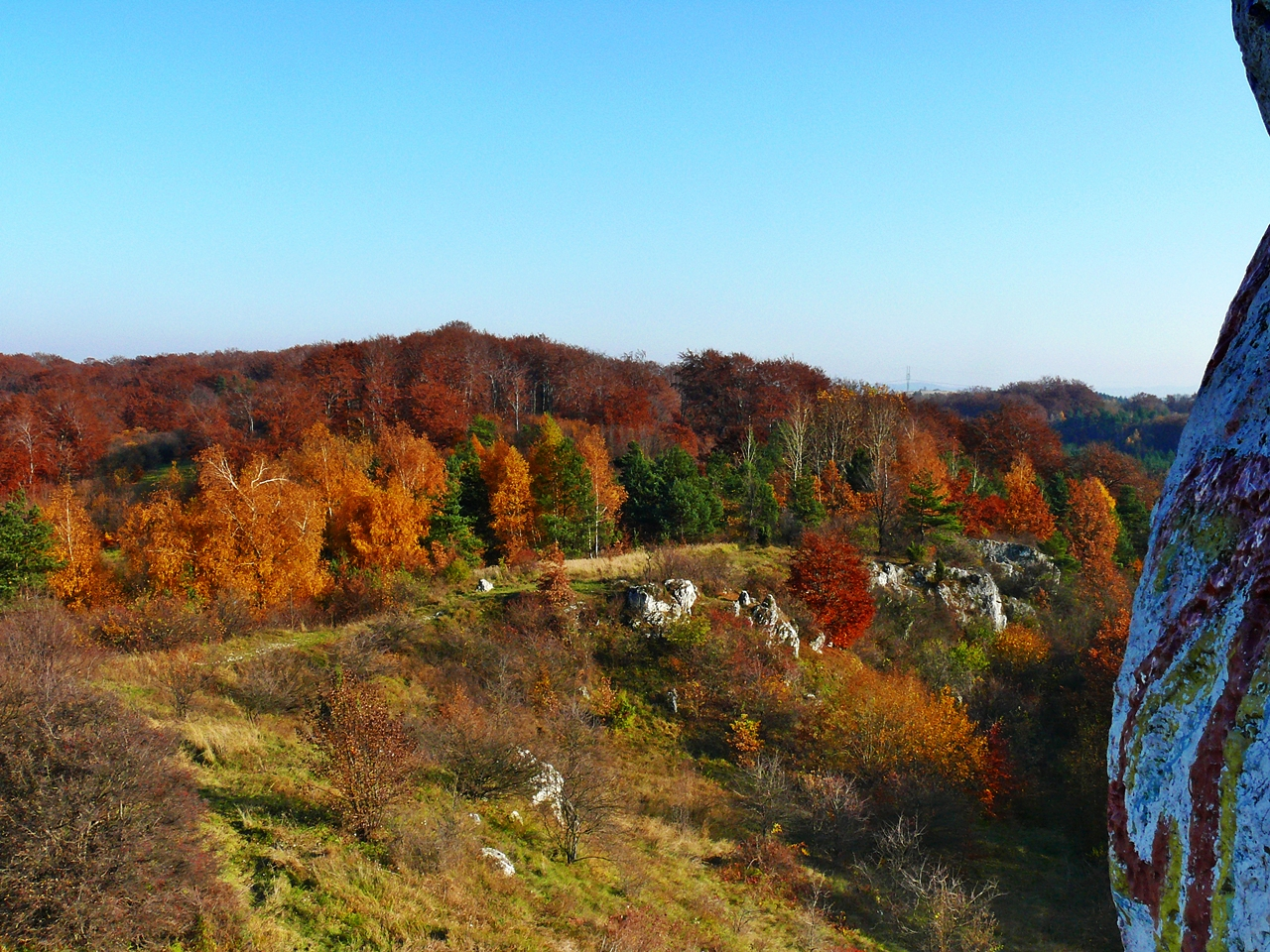
The film was shot at Kraków-Częstochowa Upland, near Częstochowa

The film was shot at Kraków-Częstochowa Upland near Częstochowa; Olsztyn castle; Wrocław, Poland.

== Release ==
The film was released in Poland uncut at 182 minutes, but it was shortened for release in the US and UK to 147 minutes and 125 minutes, respectively. Though an underground favorite, the film faced idiosyncratic distribution, particularly in the United States. At one point the American rights to the film were owned by a butcher in Chicago who had only a few prints. By the 1990s there was only one known subtitled print in the entire world and it was found to be incomplete.

Jerry Garcia became interested in the film when he saw it in 1966 at the Cento Cedar in San Francisco. In the 1990s, Garcia offered archivist Edith Kramer $6,000 to help find and restore a subtitled print of the film. Kramer purchased the film from Parisian distributor Koukou Chanska, but soon realized that it was incomplete. Garcia died the day after the print arrived from France. With Garcia out of the picture and the existence of any definitive print uncertain, Martin Scorsese stepped in, spending $36,000 to locate, restore, and subtitle Wojciech Has's personal print. The restored film, re-released in 2001, is commercially available in VHS and DVD formats.

In 2011, the film was digitally restored in HD by Kino Polska with partial funding provided by the Polish Film Institute, and is available on Blu-ray.

The film is among 21 digitally restored classic Polish films chosen for Martin Scorsese Presents: Masterpieces of Polish Cinema.

== Reception ==
On Rotten Tomatoes, the film holds an approval rating of 93% based on 15 reviews, with a weighted average rating of 8/10.

Polish critic Michał Oleszczyk writes that "the film remains a towering oddity more than a half-century after its premiere: budgeted at eighteen million zlotys at the time, when a regular feature cost one-third of that amount, it may be the strangest film epic of all time, with a Chinese-box narrative structure that still dazzles with its intricate, convoluted beauty".

Kristin Jones of the Wall Street Journal writes that "as it interweaves the rational with the supernatural, The Saragossa Manuscript becomes a celebration of storytelling and the marvels of cinema. It also suggests the inevitability of returning to the past; more than one narrative wormhole leads back to the foot of a gallows before the tales continue".

== See also ==
- List of cult films
