= Pornografia (film) =

2003 Polish–French film

- Directed by: Jan Jakub Kolski
- Written by: Witold Gombrowicz; Luc Bondy; Gérard Brach; Jan Jakub Kolski
- Produced by: Antoine de Clermont-Tonnerre; Lew Rywin
- Starring: Krzysztof Majchrzak; Adam Ferency; Krzysztof Globisz; Grażyna Błęcka-Kolska; Grzegorz Damięcki; Jan Frycz; Irena Laskowska; Sandra Samos; Anna Baniowska; Kazimierz Mazur; Jan Urbanski; Magdalena Różczka; Henryk Niebudek; Dariusz Toczek; Jerzy Chojnowski
- Cinematography: Krzysztof Ptak
- Edited by: Witold Chominski
- Music by: Zygmunt Konieczny
- Release date: 17 October 2003 (Poland)
- Running time: 117 minutes
- Countries: Poland; France
- Language: Polish
- Box office: $37,834

Pornografia is a 2003 Polish-language film directed by Jan Jakub Kolski. It is based on the 1960 novel of the same name by Witold Gombrowicz, set in Nazi-occupied Poland during World War II.

A Polish-French co-production, the film touches on themes such as European society of the 1940s as a whole, conspiracy theories, guerrilla warfare, the Nazi invasion, murder, suicide, as well as eroticism, guilt, and manipulation of youth by adults.

The score, composed by Zygmunt Konieczny, won the Georges Delerue Award at Film Fest Gent in 2003.

== Cast ==
- Krzysztof Majchrzak as Fryderyk
- Adam Ferency as Witold
- Krzysztof Globisz as Hipolit
- Grażyna Błęcka-Kolska as Maria
- Grzegorz Damiecki as Waclaw Paszkowski
- Jan Frycz as Siemian
- Irena Laskowska as Amelia
- Sandra Samos as Henia
- Anna Baniowska as Weronika
- Kazimierz Mazur as Karol
- Jan Urbanski as Skuziak
- Magdalena Różczka as sitting loom landlady
- Henryk Niebudek as Hans
- Dariusz Toczek as German soldier
- Jerzy Chojnowski as Gustaw
