= Conversation with a Cupboard Man =

1993 Polish film

- Directed by: Mariusz Grzegorzek
- Written by: Mariusz Grzegorzek
- Story by: Ian McEwan
- Cinematography: Jolanta Dylewska
- Music by: Donald Crumb; A. Nowak
- Release date: 1993
- Language: Polish

Conversation with a Cupboard Man (Polish: Rozmowa z człowiekiem z szafy, also known as The Conversation with the Man from the Closet) is a 1993 Polish drama film written and directed by Mariusz Grzegorzek and loosely based on a short story by Ian McEwan.

The film was entered into the main competition at the 50th edition of the Venice Film Festival. It also won the Special Jury Prize at the 1993 Polish Film Festival.

== Plot ==
Charles sits for hours in a wardrobe in a rented room on the attic, looking back on his whole life. He was brought up by a single mother who loved her only child with a sick desperate feeling and limited all his world to her own person. Charles' tragedy began with his adolescence. It made his mother aware of her femininity that resulted in her new marriage. Together with a new husband she decided to send the boy to a school for retarded children. Upon leaving the school Charles starts to seek his longing mother who moved out, in a meanwhile, not giving any address...

== Cast ==
- Bożena Adamek as Mother
- Rafał Olbrychski as Karol
- Karol Cieślar as Karol (3 years old)
- Maciej Wilk as Karol (7 years old)
- Adam Ferency as Kitchen Master
- Marek Walczewski as Teacher
- Stanisława Celińska as Postwoman
- Leon Niemczyk as Inspector
- Ewa Frąckiewicz as Mrs. Weiss
- Marek Siudym as Mother's Fiancé
- Piotr Pawłowski as Deth
- Wiesława Mazurkiewicz as Old Gravedigger
- Katarzyna Bargiełowska as Young Cook
