= Iga Cembrzyńska =

Polish actress (1939–2026)

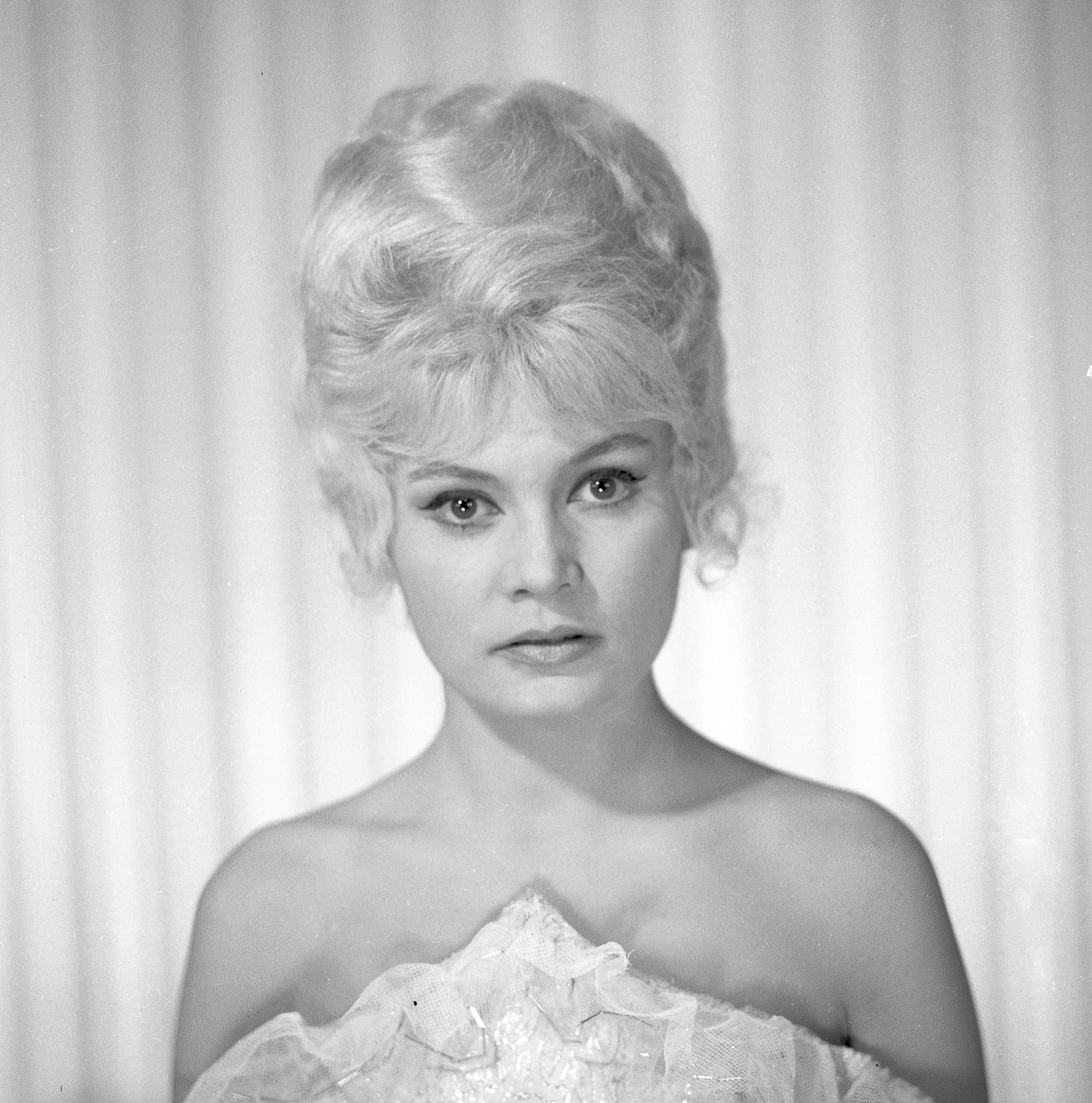
- Cembrzyńska in 1963
- Born: Maria Elżbieta Cembrzyńska; 2 July 1939; Radom, Poland
- Died: 30 July 2026 (aged 87)
- Other name: Iga Cembrzyńska-Kondratiuk
- Education: Uniwersytet Mikołaja Kopernika; National Higher School of Theatre in Warsaw
- Occupations: Actress, producer
- Notable work: The Saragossa Manuscript
- Spouse: Andrzej Kondratiuk

Maria Elżbieta "Iga" Cembrzyńska (2 July 1939 – 30 July 2026) was a Polish actress, singer, composer, screenwriter, film director and producer. She ran her own film company, Iga Film. Cembrzyńska was the wife of Polish film director Andrzej Kondratiuk.

== Life and career ==
Cembrzyńska studied philosophy at Uniwersytet Mikołaja Kopernika in Toruń, and later at the National Higher School of Theatre in Warsaw from which she graduated in 1962. She performed in several prominent theatres in Warsaw like: Teatr Powszechny, Teatr Komedia and Teatr Ateneum.

She is best known for her film roles in The Saragossa Manuscript (1964) and almost all films directed by her husband Andrzej Kondratiuk.

Cembrzyńska died on 30 July 2026, at the age of 87.

== Filmography ==
- Salto (1965)
- The Saragossa Manuscript, Rękopis znaleziony w Saragossie (1965)
- Komedia z pomyłek (1967) (TV)
- Stawka większa niż życie (1 episode, TV series)
- Ściana czarownic (1967)
- Jowita (1967)
- Hydrozagadka (1970) (TV)
- Motodrama (1971)
- Skorpion, Panna i Łucznik (1973)
- Jak to się robi (1974)
- Smuga cienia (1976)
- Pełnia (1980)
- Levins Mühle (1980)
- Gwiezdny pył (1982)
- Hotel Polan und seine Gäste (1982) (TV)
- Yokohama (1982)
- Klakier (1983)
- Krzyk (1983)
- Engagement (1984) (TV)
- Widziadło (1984) (voice)
- Cztery pory roku (1985)
- Big Bang (1986) (TV)
- Rajska jabłoń (1986)
- Dziewczęta z Nowolipek (1986)
- Siekierezada (1986)
- Pay Off (1987) (TV)
- Crimen (1988) TV mini-series
- Powroty (1989)
- Mleczna droga (1991) (TV)
- Ene
- Panna z mokrą głową (1994)
- Wrzeciono czasu (1995)
- Słoneczny zegar (1997)
- Córa marnotrawna (2001)
- Szycie na goraco (2004) (TV)
- Bar pod młynkiem (2005) (TV)
- Na dobre i na złe (1 epiѕode, TV series)
