= Silence (2001 film) =

2001 film by Michał Rosa

- Polish: Cisza
- Directed by: Michał Rosa
- Written by: Michał Rosa; Krzysztof Piesiewicz
- Produced by: Juliusz Machulski
- Starring: Kinga Preis; Bartosz Opania
- Cinematography: Arkadiusz Tomiak
- Edited by: Malgorzata Orłowska
- Music by: Tomasz Stanko
- Release date: October 26, 2001 (Poland)
- Running time: 89 minutes
- Country: Poland
- Language: Polish

Silence (Polish: Cisza) is a 2001 Polish film directed by Michał Rosa from a screenplay by Rosa and Krzysztof Piesiewicz. Rosa was named best director for the film at the 2001 Polish Film Festival. Actress Kinga Preis won Best Actress at both the Polish Film Festival and the 2002 Polish Film Awards. The film was also nominated for Polish Film Awards for its cinematography and its score.

Cisza is one of several Polish films released in 2001 with a religious theme. According to Piesiewicz, Cisza was intended as the first of eight films intended to "synthesize the last 20 years of Polish history." The series was to be called Naznaczeni (Predestined).

== Plot ==
The film begins in 1978 in Łódź when a young boy Szymon accidentally causes a deadly car crash while playing pranks with his friends. The scene then jumps forward 22 years, when Szymon, now portrayed by Bartosz Opania becomes friendly with Mimi, played by Preis. Mimi's parents had been killed in the car crash 22 years earlier and Mimi herself had survived the crash. The relationship forces Mimi to face the issues from her past and her attitude to her own daughter, while Szymon attempts to relieve the guilt he feels by watching over and trying to protect Mimi.

== Reception ==
Film critic Andrew James Horton claims that the film's "portrayal of a woman falling in love with her stalker will be morally sickening and insensitive and outweigh Piesiewicz' otherwise worthy aims." But author Steven Woodward points out that the same could be said about some other films cowritten by Piesiewicz, such as A Short Film About Love and The Double Life of Veronique, and that Cisza "aspires to the metaphysics of The Double Life of Veronique.

== Cast ==
- Kinga Preis as Magdalena "Mimi"
- Bartosz Opania as Szymon
- Zuzanna Rezner as Magda
- Marek Kimona as Szymon
- Ilona Ostrowska
- Irena Burawska
- Magdalena Kuta as Stanisława
- Laura Konczarek as Ola
- Wojciech Wasasik
- Piotr Kopczyński
- Wojciech Kalarus
- Przemysław Rezner
- Jolanta Fraszyńska
- Sylwia Juszczak
- Jerzy Matula
