= Irena Laskowska =

Polish actress (1925–2019)

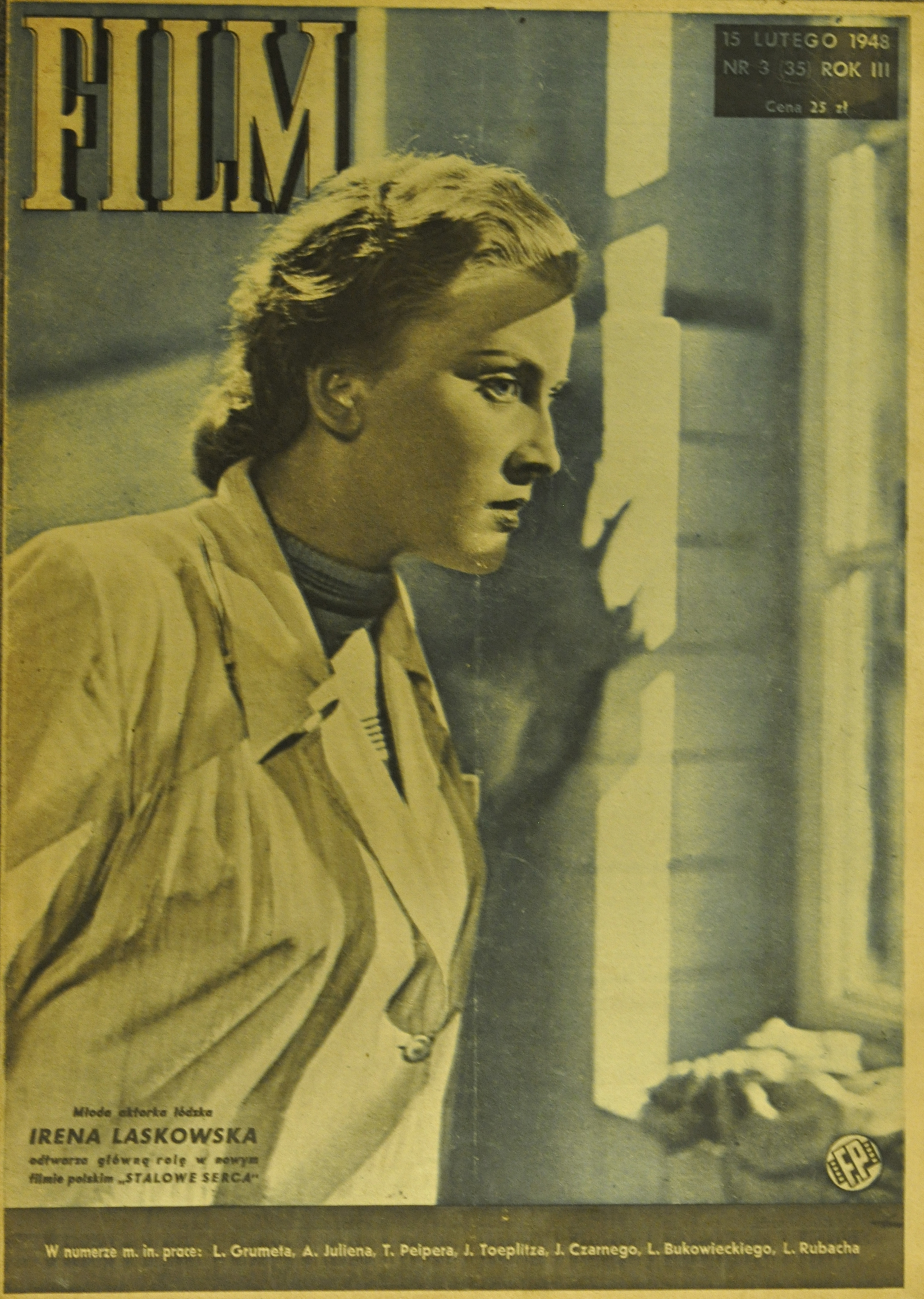
- Laskowska on a 1948 magazine cover
- Born: 15 March 1925; Kraków, Poland
- Died: 6 December 2019 (aged 94); Warsaw, Poland
- Occupation: Actress
- Years active: 1948–2003

Irena Laskowska (15 March 1925 – 6 December 2019) was a Polish actress. She appeared in more than 40 films and television shows between 1948 and 2003.

== Selected filmography ==
- The Last Day of Summer (1958)
- Milczące ślady (1961)
- Salto (1965)
- Hunting Flies (1969)
- Everything for Sale (1969)
- Pornografia (2003)
