= Franciszek Pieczka =

Polish actor (1928–2022)

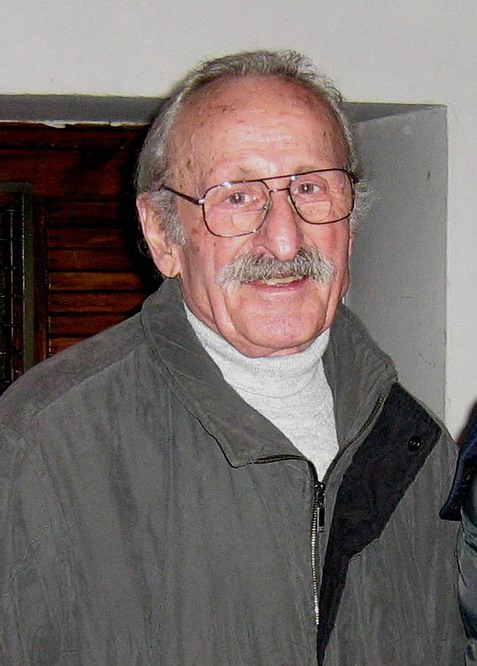
- Pieczka in 2007
- Born: 18 January 1928; Godów, Silesia, Poland
- Died: 23 September 2022 (aged 94)
- Occupations: Film actor, stage actor
- Awards: Order of the White Eagle (Poland) Order Odrodzenia Polski Krzyż Zasługi

Franciszek Maksymilian Pieczka (18 January 1928 – 23 September 2022) was a Polish actor. A graduate of the National Higher School of Theatre in Warsaw (1954), he first made his debut in the theatre in Jelenia Góra. He won the award for Best Actor at the Polish Film Festival in 1976 for The Scar.

In 2015, he was awarded the Polish Academy Life Achievement Award.

== Biography ==
Franciszek Pieczka was born and raised in Godów. He was the youngest of six siblings.

After World War II, he studied acting. A graduate of the Aleksander Zelwerowicz National Academy of Dramatic Art in Warsaw. He made his debut at the Dolnośląski Theater in Jelenia Góra. Then he moved to the Ludowy Theatre in Nowa Huta, where he performed in the years 1955–1964. In 1974–2015, he was an actor of the Powszechny Theater in Warsaw.

He has starred in over a hundred films, both Polish and foreign. He has been awarded and honored many times for his individual roles, as well as his contribution to the development of theater and film art. Franciszek Pieczka is an honorary citizen of the Godów commune.

In 2016, he supported the fight against smog in his hometown of Upper Silesia, appearing in a film clip entitled Nie truj sąsiada! recorded together with the city of Wodzisław Śląski.

On 11 November 2017, he was awarded the highest Polish state decoration, the Order of the White Eagle.

Pieczka died on 23 September 2022, at the age of 94.

== Filmography ==
- Matka Joanna od Aniołów (1960)
- Kwiecień (1961) as Anklewicz
- Drugi brzeg (1962)
- Zacne grzechy (1963)
- Rękopis znaleziony w Saragossie (1964)
- Czterej pancerni i pies (1966-1970) as Gustlik
- Żywot Mateusza (1968) as Mateusz
- Hydrozagadka (1970)
- Liberation (1970)
- Perła w koronie (1971)
- Wesele (1972) as Czepiec
- Ziemia obiecana (1974) as Muller
- Potop (1974) as old Kiemlicz
- Budapest Tales (1976)
- The Scar (1976)
- The Woman Across the Way (1978)
- Jadup and Boel (1980)
- Ród Gąsieniców (1981)
- Austeria (1982) as Tag
- Blisko coraz bliżej (1982) as Franciszek Pasternik
- Konopielka (1982) as God
- Axiliad (1986)
- The Mother of Kings (1987)
- Memories of a River (1990)
- God afton, Herr Wallenberg (1990)
- Burial of a Potato (1990)
- Jańcio Wodnik (1993)
- Johnnie Waterman (1994)
- Thanks for Every New Morning (1994)
- Szabla od komendanta (1995)
- Historia kina w Popielawach (1998)
- Syzyfowe prace (1998) as Joseph
- Quo Vadis (2001) as Saint Peter
- Jasminum (2006)
- Ranczo (2007-2016)
