= Out of Life =

- Directed by: Maroun Bagdadi
- Written by: Maroun Bagdadi; Didier Decoin; Elias Khoury
- Produced by: Mario Gallo; Enzo Giulioli; Jacques Perrin
- Starring: Hippolyte Girardot; Rafic Ali Ahmad
- Cinematography: Patrick Blossier
- Edited by: Luc Barnier
- Music by: Nicola Piovani
- Distributed by: BAC Films
- Release date: 15 May 1991 (premiere at Cannes)
- Running time: 97 minutes
- Country: France
- Language: French

Out of Life (French: Hors la vie) is a 1991 film directed by Lebanese director Maroun Bagdadi. The film tells the story of a French photographer (played by Hippolyte Girardot), who is kidnapped in Beirut, Lebanon, and attempts to maintain his personal dignity in the face of torture and brainwashing. The story was inspired by the events surrounding the kidnapping of Roger Auque during the Lebanon hostage crisis. The film was produced by the French companies Galatée Films and Films A2.

== Cast ==
- Hippolyte Girardot as Patrick Perrault
- Rafic Ali Ahmad as Walid 'Chief'
- Hussein Sbeity as Omar
- Habib Hammoud as Ali 'Philippe'
- Majdi Machmouchi as Moustapha
- Hassan Farhat as Ahmed 'Frankenstein'
- Hassan Zbib as Fadi
- Nabila Zeitouni as Najat
- Hamza Nasrallah as 'De Niro'
- Sami Hawat as Hassan
- Sabrina Leurquin as Isabelle
- Roger Assaf as Farid
- Nidal Al-Askhar as Khaled's Mother (as Nidal Ashkar)
- Fadi Abou Khalil as (as Fady Abou Khalil)

== Awards ==
The film won the Jury Prize at the 1991 Cannes Film Festival.
