= Witold Wieliński =

Polish actor

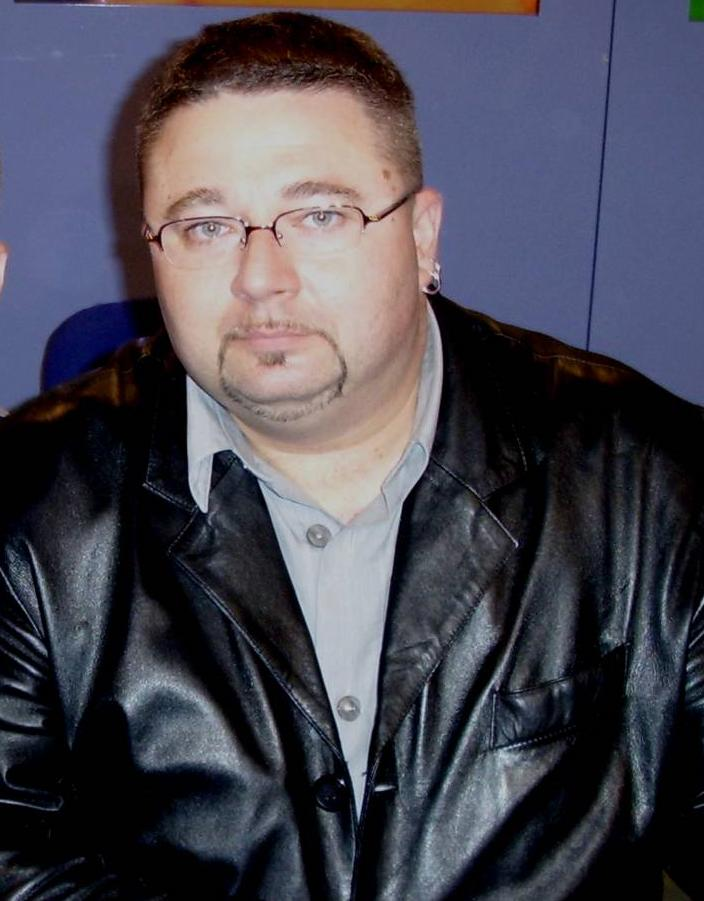
- Witold Wieliński in 2006
- Born: Witold Wieliński; June 26, 1968 (age 56)
- Occupation: Actor
- Years active: 1991–present

Witold Wieliński (born 26 June 1968) is a Polish actor. In 1991 he finished his studies in Warszawa.

== Selected filmography ==
- 1992 - A Bachelor's Life Abroad as Wacek
- 2004 - The Wedding as Gruby
- 2008 - Four Nights with Anna
- 2008 - Louise's Garden
- 2009 - Pierwsza miłość as Sylwester Banaszkiewicz "Medyk"
- 2013 - Life Feels Good
- 2018 - Birds Are Singing in Kigali
