= Little Wars (film) =

1982 film

- Directed by: Maroun Bagdadi
- Written by: Maroun Bagdadi; Kamal Kassar
- Produced by: Maroun Bagdadi
- Starring: Roger Hawa
- Cinematography: Edward Lachman
- Edited by: Joële Van Effenterre
- Music by: Gabriel Yared
- Release date: 2 October 1982
- Running time: 108 minutes
- Countries: France; Lebanon
- Languages: French; Arabic

Little Wars (French: Les petites guerres, Arabic: حروب صغيرة ḥurūb ṣaġīrah, translit. Horoub Saghira) is a 1982 French-Lebanese war film directed by Maroun Bagdadi. It was screened in the Un Certain Regard section at the 1982 Cannes Film Festival. The film screened at New York Film Festival on 2 October 1982.

== Cast ==
- Roger Hawa as Talal
- Youcef Hosni as L'oncle de Soraya
- Nabil Ismaïl as Nabil
- Reda Khoury as- La mère de Talal
- Soraya Khoury as Soraya
- Rifaat Tarabay as Selim

== Reception ==
Critic Janet Maslin wrote an overall positive review in the New York Times citing the film as "somewhat hazy and highly imaginative", arguing that Little Wars "is on the weak side as drama, and it's somewhat obscure as a political statement, but as a still-life and mood piece it is highly effective."
