= A Very Christmas Story =

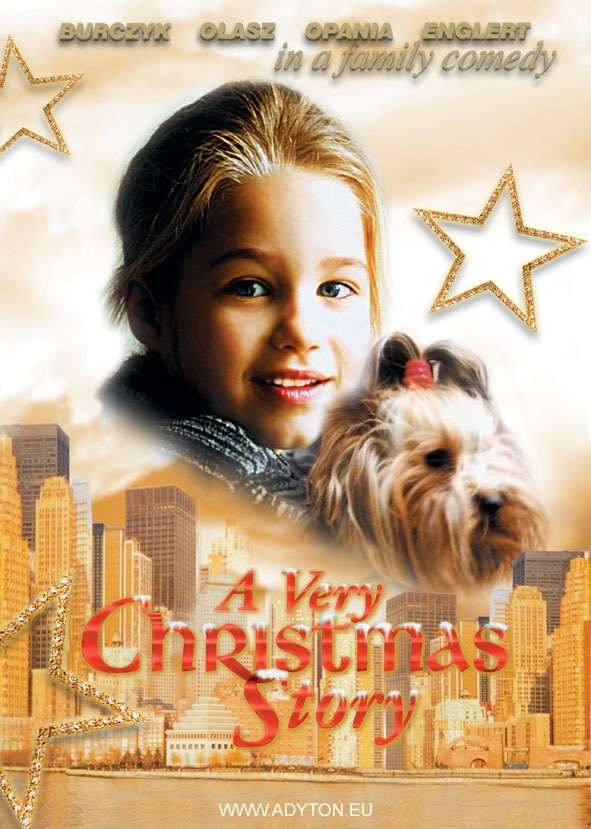
- Film poster
- Polish: Świąteczna Przygoda
- Directed by: Dariusz Zawislak
- Written by: (Polish version); Dariusz Zawislak; Paul Burczyk; (English version); Robert Fleet; Alina Szpak
- Produced by: Dariusz Zawislak
- Starring: Paul Burczyk; Kasia Olarz; Bartosz Opania; Jan Englert; Jerzy Lapinski
- Cinematography: Jacek Pliszka
- Edited by: Jaroslaw Barzan; Bartlomiej Wroblewski; Grzegorz R. Wróblewski
- Music by: Chris Rafael Wnuk; Maciej Zielinski
- Production company: Adyton Television
- Distributed by: Intercinema Poland; Adyton International
- Release date: 3 November 2000 (Poland)
- Running time: 90 minutes
- Country: Poland
- Languages: Polish; English
- Budget: $1,500,000 (est)

A Very Christmas Story (Polish: Świąteczna Przygoda) is a 2000 Polish comedy film written and directed by Dariusz Zawiślak.

== Plot ==
Corporate accountant Mike Young (Paul Burczyk) has a briefcase full of stolen money. Angelika (Kasia Olarz) seeks money to save her orphanage. The Angel of Death (Jan Englert) has been begging God (Gustaw Holoubek) for a vacation day. With so many souls to be gathered, a substitute is found, but when on vacation Death crosses paths with a Guardian Angel (Teresa Dzielska). Meanwhile, Angelica is looking for Santa Claus to fulfill her Christmas wish for money. During her search she crosses paths with an accountant named Claus (Bartosz Opania) who has stolen a huge amount of money and who is himself being pursued by a group of bumbling hoodlums.

== Cast ==
- Paul Burczyk as Young
- Kasia Olarz as Angelica
- Bartosz Opania as Claus
- Jan Englert as Death
- Jerzy Łapiński as Poodle
- Teresa Dzielska as Jo
- Slawomir Pacek as Dachshound
- Gustaw Holoubek as God
- Jacek Jarzyna as Mr. Walizeczka
- Stefan Burczyk as Q
- Józef Fryzlewicz as Boss
- Dorota Naruszewicz
- Wojciech Mann
- Krzysztof Materna
- Aleksandra Nieśpielak
- Rafal Okyne

== Soundtrack ==
1. Kto Wie, performed by De Su
2. Kiedy Rozsypia Sie Pomarancze, performed by Daria Druzgala
3. Dwie Strony Medalu, performed by Wojciech Dmochowski
4. Szklane Kulki, performed by Zuzanna Madejska
5. Intro, composed by Rafal Wnuk
6. Niebo, composed by Rafal Wnuk
7. Dziewczynka
8. Konfrontacja, composed by Rafal Wnuk
9. Jamnik i Pudel
10. Pomarancze
11. Chinczyk
12. Dwie Strony Medalu II, performed by Wojciech Dmochowski
13. Szklane Kulki II, performed by Zuzanna Madejska
14. Karaiby
15. Kto Wie (Wersja Instrumentalna)
16. De Su - "Kto Wie"

== Locations ==
The film was shot on locations in New York City, Warsaw, and Amsterdam.

== Recognition ==
- 2001, nomination for Golden Lion for 'Best Picture' at Gdynia Film Festival.
