= Beirut Oh Beirut =

Lebanese film

- Directed by: Maroun Bagdadi
- Written by: Oussama El-Arefm Maroun Bagdadi
- Starring: Ezzat El Alaili; Mireille Maalouf; Joseph Bou Nassar
- Cinematography: Roby Breidi
- Music by: Walid Ghanis
- Release date: 1975
- Running time: 111 minutes
- Country: Lebanon
- Language: Arabic

Beirut Oh Beirut (French: Beyrouth ya Beyrouth; Arabic: بيروت يا بيروت) is a 1975 Lebanese drama film directed by Maroun Bagdadi, who co-wrote it with Oussama El-Aref. It was Bagdadi's feature film directorial debut. The story follows the lives of four characters living in Beirut who are trying to find their way in the aftermath of the 1967 Arab-Israeli war.

== Cast ==
- Ezzat El Alaili as Kamal
- Mireille Maalouf as Hala
- Joseph Bou Nassar as Emiel
- Ahmed Al Zain as Safwan

== Production ==
Bagdadi begun to develop the screenplay for the film whilst at university in Paris.

Filming began at Bagdadi's friend's house, then moved to the Al-Qurair School in Gemmayzeh, where the director spent his childhood and teenage years, and later to the Al-Mahaji Daoud neighborhood. It was also shot in the streets of Beirut and at the Lebanese University.

== Release ==
The film was premiered on the eve of the Lebanese Civil War.

== Reception ==
The Lebanese Film Festival Australia held a screening marking the film's 50th anniversary, calling it a "landmark in Lebanese cinema" on their website.

== See also ==
- List of Lebanese films
