= Grażyna Błęcka-Kolska =

Polish actress (born 1962)

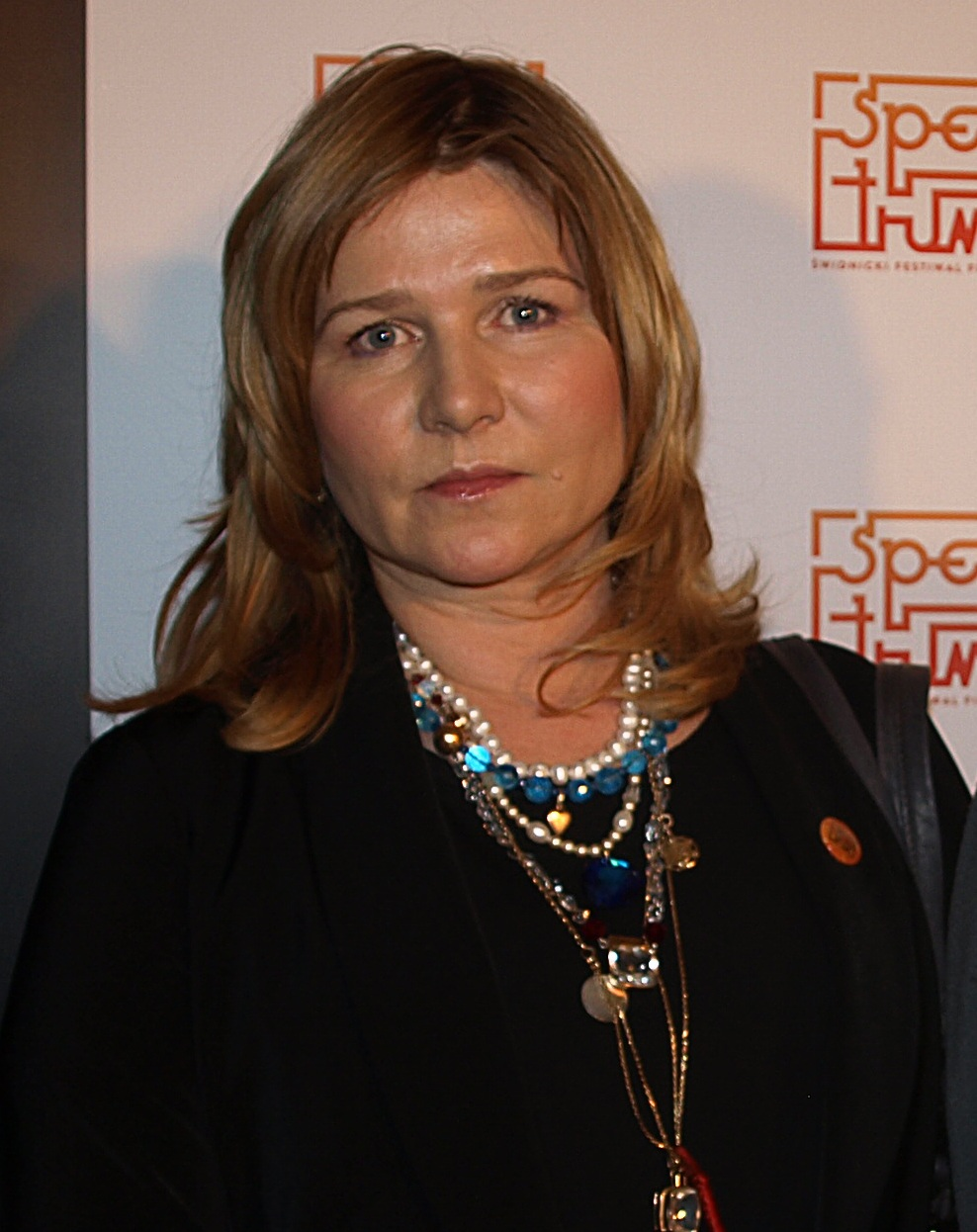
- Born: 16 February 1962 (age 64); Łódź, Poland
- Occupation: Actress
- Years active: 1988–present

Grażyna Błęcka-Kolska (born 16 February 1962) is a Polish actress. She has appeared in 22 films and television shows since 1988. She starred in Johnnie Waterman, which was screened in the Un Certain Regard section at the 1994 Cannes Film Festival.

She is the ex-wife of film director Jan Jakub Kolski.

== Selected filmography ==
- Burial of a Potato (1990)
- Johnnie Waterman (1994)
- Historia kina w Popielawach (1998)
- Pornografia (2003)
- The Office PL (2021)
