= Wiesława Mazurkiewicz =

Polish film and theater actress (1926–2021)

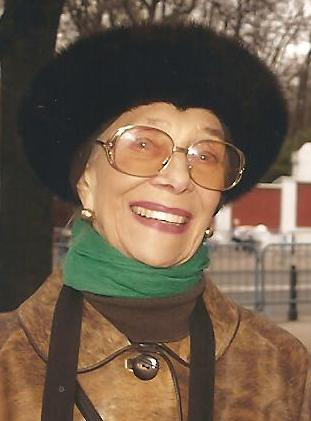
- Wiesława Mazurkiewicz
- Born: Wiesława Mazurkiewicz-Lutkiewicz; 25 March 1926; Łódź, Poland
- Died: 20 April 2021 (aged 95); Warsaw, Poland
- Occupation: Actress
- Spouse: Gustaw Lutkiewicz

Wiesława Mazurkiewicz-Lutkiewicz (25 March 1926 – 20 April 2021) was a Polish film and theater actress. She graduated from the National Film School in Łódź in 1952.

In 1974 she starred in the Academy Award-nominated film The Deluge under Jerzy Hoffman.

Mazurkiewicz appeared in the Teatr Nowy i Łódź, Juliusz Słowacki Theatre in Kraków, Teatr Powszechny in Warsaw, National Theatre in Warsaw and Teatr Rozmaitości in Warsaw.

She was awarded the Gold Cross of Merit in 1979.

Mazurkiewicz died on 20 April 2021, aged 95.

== Selected filmography ==
- Godzina pąsowej róży (as Wanda) (1963)
- Pharaoh (as Queen Nikotris, mother of Ramses XIII) (1966)
- Hydrozagadka (as Florist) (1970)
- The Deluge (as Aunt Kulwiecówna) (1974)
- Interrogation (as Female Prison Officer) (1982)
- Woman in a Hat (as Ewa's Mother) (1985)
- Pięć kobiet na tle morza (as Countess Aleksandra Dunin-Borkowska) (1986)
- Gorzka miłość (as Marta Powiłańska, Hanna's Mother) (1989)
- Conversation with a Cupboard Man (1993)
- To nie tak jak myślisz, kotku (as Waleria) (2008)
