= Pornografia =

1960 novel by Witold Gombrowicz

- Author: Witold Gombrowicz
- Translator: Danuta Borchardt
- Language: Polish
- Publication date: 1960
- English publication date: 1966; 2009

Pornografia is a 1960 novel by the Polish writer Witold Gombrowicz. The narrative revolves around two middle-aged Warsawian intellectuals, who during a trip to the countryside during World War II construct a scheme to entice two teenagers in a scheme to disturb the young girl's fiancé and, later, to have the youngsters enact the murder of a leader in the Polish resistance.

== Publication ==
The book was originally published in 1960. In 1966, an English translation from French was published in the United Kingdom through Calder and Boyars, and the United States through Grove Press. In 2009 Grove Press published an English translation by Danuta Borchardt, from the original Polish.

== Critical response ==
Upon the 2009 American release, Michael Dirda wrote in The Washington Post that Pornografia "seems as sick, as pathologically creepy a novel as one is ever likely to read. In some ways, it resembles a rather more polymorphously perverse version of Les Liaisons Dangereuses or one of those disturbing fictions by European intellectuals that blend the philosophical with the erotic: Think of Georges Bataille's The Story of the Eye or Pierre Klossowski's Roberte Ce Soir. ... Through its sado-masochistic material and its almost Henry Jamesian analyses of human motives, Pornografia underscores Gombrowicz's lifelong philosophical obsession: the quest for authenticity." Dirda continued: "Certainly, most readers will find Pornografia perturbing, or worse: repulsive, confusing, ugly. As Miłosz once said of Gombrowicz: 'He had no reverence whatsoever for literature. He derided it as a snobbish ritual, and if he practiced it, he attempted to get rid of all its accepted rules.'"

== Adaptation ==
A Polish film adaptation was released in 2003. It was directed by Jan Jakub Kolski and titled Pornografia.
