= Maroun Bagdadi =

Film director (1950–1993)

- Maroun Bagdadi
- Born: January 21, 1950; Lebanon
- Died: December 10, 1993 (aged 43); Lebanon
- Occupation: Film director
- Spouse: Soraya Khoury
- Children: 3

Maroun Bagdadi (also Baghdadi; Arabic: مارون بغدادي, mārūn baġdādi; January 21, 1950 – December 10, 1993) was a Lebanese film director known for his vivid portrayal of Lebanon's civil war. Bagdadi was internationally the best-known Lebanese filmmaker of his generation. He worked with American producer/director Francis Coppola and made several films in French that became hits in France.

== Career ==
Maroun Bagdadi was arguably Lebanon's most prominent filmmaker, one whose work has been seen all over the world. One of his best-known films, Houroub Saghira (Little Wars), was shown at the 1982 Cannes Film Festival, drawing this comment from a prominent film critic: "To make a film about Beirut that eschews polemics for more universal, more human issues is an achievement." His first Lebanese production was for television, an educational program called 7½. In 1975, he directed his first feature film, Beirut Oh Beirut. Koullouna Lil Watan (We are all for the fatherland), a 75-minute documentary produced in 1979, won the Jury Honor Prize at the International Leipzig Festival Documentary and Animated Film.

== Death ==
Bagdadi died on December 10, 1993, aged 43, allegedly after an accidental fall down an elevator shaft at his home in Beirut. He is survived by his wife and favorite actress, Soraya, a daughter of former defense minister Victor Khoury whose acting career continues as of 2017, and their three children.

== Filmography ==
- La Fille de l'air (1992)
- Out of Life (1991)
- Lebanon, the Land of Honey and Incense (1988)
- The Veiled Man (1987)
- War on War (1983)
- Little Wars (1982)
- Whispers (1980)
- The Procession (1980)
- We Are All for the Fatherland (1979)
- The Story of a Village and a War (1979)
- The Martyr (1979)
- Ninety (1978)
- The Most Beautiful of All Mothers (1978)
- Greetings to Kamal Jumblat (1977)
- The South Is Fine, How About You (1976)
- The Majority Is Standing Strong (1976)
- Kafarkala (1976)
- Beirut Oh Beirut (1975)

== Awards ==
- Jury Prize at the 1991 Cannes Film Festival for Out of Life (Hors La Vie)
- Jury Honor Prize at the International Leipzig Festival Documentary and Animated Film for Koullouna Lil Watan
