= 1991 Cannes Film Festival =

- Official poster of the 44th Cannes Film Festival, an original illustration by Philippe and Pascal Lemoine.
- Opening film: Homicide
- Closing film: Thelma & Louise
- Location: Cannes, France
- Founded: 1946
- Awards: Palme d'Or: Barton Fink
- No. of films: 19 (In Competition)
- Festival date: 9 May 1991 – 20 May 1991
- Website: festival-cannes.com/en

Cannes Film Festival
- 1992 1990

The 44th Cannes Film Festival was held from 9 to 20 May 1991. French-Polish filmmaker Roman Polanski served as jury president for the main competition.

American filmmakers Joel Coen and Ethan Coen won the Palme d'Or, the festival's top prize, for the comedy film Barton Fink.

The festival opened with Homicide by David Mamet, and closed with Thelma & Louise by Ridley Scott.

== Juries ==
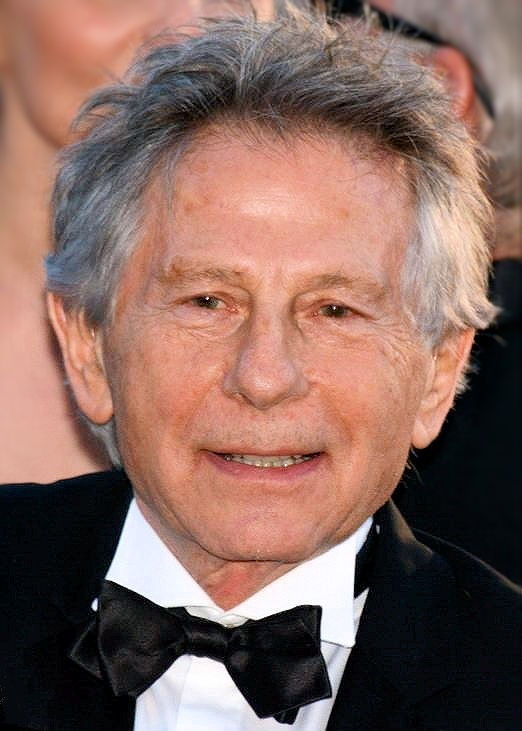
Roman Polanski, Jury President of the Main competition

=== Main competition ===
- Roman Polanski, French-Polish filmmaker - Jury President
- Férid Boughedir, Tunisian filmmaker
- Whoopi Goldberg, American actress
- Margaret Ménégoz, German-French producer
- Natalya Negoda, Soviet actress
- Alan Parker, British filmmaker
- Jean-Paul Rappeneau, French filmmaker
- Hans Dieter Seidel, German film critic
- Vittorio Storaro, Italian cinematographer
- Vangelis, Greek musician

=== Camera d'Or ===
- Geraldine Chaplin, American actress - Jury President
- Jan Aghed, Swedish journalist
- Didier Beaudet, French
- Gilles Colpart, French film critic
- Roger Kahane, French film director
- Fernando Lara, Spanish cinephile
- Eva Sirbu, Romanian journalist
- Myriam Zemmour, French cinephile

== Official selection ==
=== In Competition ===
The following feature films competed for the Palme d'Or:

English title	Original title	Director(s)	Production Country
The Assassin of the Tsar	Цареубийца	Karen Shakhnazarov	Soviet Union
Anna Karamazoff	Анна Карамазофф	Rustam Khamdamov	Soviet Union
Barton Fink		Joel Coen and Ethan Coen	United States
La Belle Noiseuse		Jacques Rivette	France, Switzerland
Bix		Pupi Avati	Italy
Cold Moon	Lune froide	Patrick Bouchitey	France
The Double Life of Veronique	La double vie de Véronique	Krzysztof Kieślowski	Poland, France, Norway
Europa		Lars von Trier	Denmark, France, Germany, Sweden, Switzerland
The Flesh	La carne	Marco Ferreri	Italy
Guilty by Suspicion		Irwin Winkler	United States, France
Homicide (opening film)		David Mamet	United States
Jungle Fever		Spike Lee	United States
Life on a String	边走边唱	Chen Kaige	China
Malina		Werner Schroeter	Germany, Austria
Out of Life	Hors la vie	Maroun Bagdadi	France
A Rage in Harlem		Bill Duke	United States
The Suspended Step of the Stork	Το Mετέωρο Bήμα Tου Πελαργού	Theo Angelopoulos	Greece
Van Gogh		Maurice Pialat	France
The Yes Man	Il portaborse	Daniele Luchetti	Italy

=== Un Certain Regard ===
The following films were selected for the Un Certain Regard section:

English title	Original title	Director(s)	Production Country
Boyz n the Hood		John Singleton	United States
Burial of a Potato	Pogrzeb kartofla	Jan Jakub Kolski	Poland
A Captive in the Land	Пленник земли	John Berry	Soviet Union, United States
The Chosen One	Ishanou	Aribam Syam Sharma	India
Comrade Chkalov Crosses the North Pole	Переход товарища Чкалова через Северный полюс	Maksim Pezhemsky	Soviet Union
L'entraînement du champion avant la course		Bernard Favre	France
Escape from the 'Liberty' Cinema	Ucieczka z kina 'Wolność'	Wojciech Marczewski	Poland
Fire!	Ta Dona	Adama Drabo	Mali
Friends, Comrades	Ystävät, toverit	Rauni Mollberg	Finland
Hearts of Darkness: A Filmmaker's Apocalypse		Fax Bahr and George Hickenlooper	United States
Holidays on the River Yarra		Leo Berkeley	Australia
In the Alleys of Love	در کوچه‌های عشق	Khosrow Sinai	Iran
Lebewohl, Fremde		Tevfik Başer	Germany
Paths of Death and Angels	Halálutak és angyalok	Zoltán Kamondi	Hungary
Revenge	Месть	Yermek Shinarbayev	Soviet Union
The Tradition	Laada	Drissa Toure	Burkina Faso
Sango Malo		Bassek Ba Kobhio	Cameroon, Burkina Faso
Treasure Island	L'île au trésor	Raúl Ruiz	United Kingdom, France, United States
Woman of the Port	La mujer del puerto	Arturo Ripstein	Mexico
Yumeji	夢二	Seijun Suzuki	Japan

=== Out of Competition ===
The following films were selected to be screened out of competition:

English title	Original title	Director(s)	Production Country
Le film du cinéma suisse		Michel Soutter and Jean-François Amiguet	Switzerland
Jacquot de Nantes		Agnès Varda	France
Life Stinks		Mel Brooks	United States
Madonna: Truth or Dare		Alek Keshishian	United States
Prospero's Books		Peter Greenaway	United Kingdom, Netherlands, France, Italy, Japan
Rhapsody in August	八月の狂詩曲	Akira Kurosawa	Japan
Thelma & Louise (closing film)		Ridley Scott	United States

=== Short Films Competition ===
The following short films competed for the Short Film Palme d'Or:

- Broken Skin by Anna Campion
- Casino by Gil Bauwens
- Les éffaceurs by Gérald Frydman
- Ja, Wałęsa by Jacek Skalski
- Mal de blocs by Marc Saint-Pierre, Nathalie Saint-Gelais
- La Noce by Régis Obadia, Joëlle Bouvier
- Nokturno by Nikola Majdak
- Push Comes to Shove by Bill Plympton
- La vie selon Luc by Jean-Paul Civeyrac
- W.A.L. by Robert Turlo
- With Hands Raised (Z podniesionymi rekami) by Mitko Panov

== Parallel sections ==
=== International Critics' Week ===
The following films were screened for the 30th International Critics' Week (30e Semaine de la Critique):

Feature film competition

- Diabły, diabły by Dorota Kędzierzawska (Poland)
- Laafi - Tout va bien by S. Pierre Yameogo (Burkina Faso)
- Liquid Dreams by Mark S. Manos (United States)
- Robert's Movie by Canan Gerede (Turkey)
- Sam & Me by Deepa Mehta (Canada)
- Trumpet Number 7 by Adrian Velicescu (United States)
- La Vie des morts by Arnaud Desplechin (France)
- Young Soul Rebels by Isaac Julien (United Kingdom)

Short film competition

- Carne by Gaspar Noé (France)
- Die mysreriosen lebenslinien by David Rühm (Austria)
- Livraison à domicile by Claude Philippot (France)
- A Nice Arrangement by Gurinder Chadha (United Kingdom)
- Once Upon a Time by Kristian Petri (Sweden)
- Petit drame dans la vie d’une femme by Andrée Pelletier (Canada)
- Une Symphonie du havre by Barbara Doran (Canada)

=== Directors' Fortnight ===
The following films were screened for the 1991 Directors' Fortnight (Quinzaine des Réalizateurs):

- The Adjuster by Atom Egoyan
- Annabelle partagée by Francesca Comencini
- The Cabinet of Dr. Ramirez by Peter Sellars
- Chichkhan by Fadhel Jaïbi, M. Ben Mahmoud
- Danzón by Maria Novaro
- O Drapetis by Lefteris Xanthopoulos
- És mégis... by Zsolt Kézdi-Kovács
- An Imaginary Tale (Une histoire inventée) by André Forcier
- The Indian Runner by Sean Penn
- Lost In Siberia by Alexander Mitta
- Ovo Malo Duse by Ademir Kenović
- Paris Trout by Stephen Gyllenhaal
- Proof by Jocelyn Moorhouse
- Adam's Rib by Vyacheslav Krishtofovich
- Riff-Raff by Ken Loach
- Toto the Hero (Toto le héros) by Jaco Van Dormael
- Suffocating Heat (Caldo soffocante) by Giovanna Gagliardo

Short films

- Le Caire by Youssef Chahine

== Official Awards ==
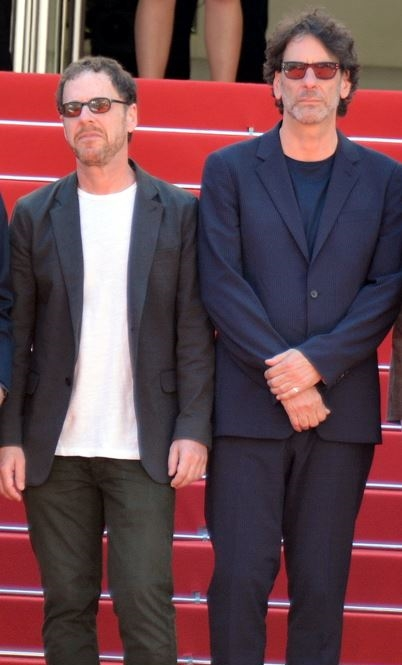
Joel and Ethan Coen, Palme d'Or winners

=== In Competition ===
- Palme d'Or: Barton Fink by Joel Coen and Ethan Coen
- Grand Prize of the Jury: La Belle Noiseuse by Jacques Rivette
- Best Director: Joel Coen for Barton Fink
- Best Actress: Irène Jacob for The Double Life of Veronique
- Best Actor: John Turturro for Barton Fink
- Best Supporting Actor: Samuel L. Jackson for Jungle Fever
- Jury Prize:
  - Europa by Lars von Trier
  - Out of Life by Maroun Bagdadi

=== Caméra d'Or ===
- Toto le Héros by Jaco Van Dormael
  - Special Mention:
    - Proof by Jocelyn Moorhouse
    - Sam & Me by Deepa Mehta

=== Short Film Palme d'Or ===
- With Hands Raised by Mitko Panov
- Special Jury Prize: Push Comes to Shove by Bill Plympton

== Independent Awards ==
=== FIPRESCI Prizes ===
- The Double Life of Veronique by Krzysztof Kieślowski (In competition)
- Riff-Raff by Ken Loach (Directors' Fortnight)

=== Commission Supérieure Technique ===
- Technical Grand Prize: Lars von Trier for Europa

=== Prize of the Ecumenical Jury ===
- The Double Life of Veronique by Krzysztof Kieślowski
  - Special Mention:
    - Jungle Fever by Spike Lee
    - La Belle Noiseuse by Jacques Rivette

=== Award of the Youth ===
- Foreign Film: Toto le Héros by Jaco Van Dormael
- French Film: Cheb by Rachid Bouchareb

=== International Critics' Week ===
- SACD Award:
  - Best Short: Carne by Gaspar Noé
  - Best Feature: Young Soul Rebels by Isaac Julien

== Media ==
- INA: Robert Mitchum opens the 1991 Festival (commentary in French)
- INA: List of winners of the 1991 festival (commentary in French)
