= Andrzej Barański =

Polish film director

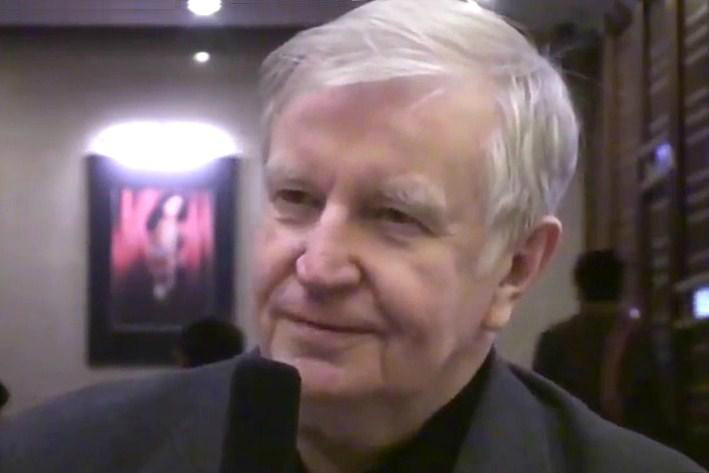
- Born: 2 April 1941 (age 85); Pintschow, General Government
- Occupations: Film director, screenwriter
- Years active: 1970-present

Andrzej Barański (born 2 April 1941) is a Polish film director and screenwriter. He has directed more than 45 films since 1970. His 1992 film A Bachelor's Life Abroad was entered into the 18th Moscow International Film Festival.

== Selected filmography ==
- A Bachelor's Life Abroad (1992)
