= Joanna Jędryka =

Polish actress

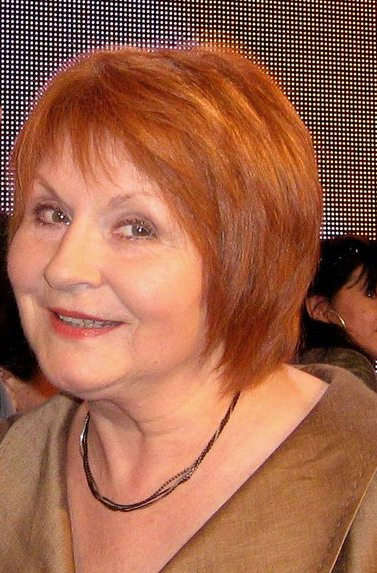
- Jędryka in 2007
- Born: Stanisława Jędryka; 1 January 1940 (age 86); Trembowla, Poland
- Other names: Joanna Jędryka-Chamiec; Joanna Chamiec
- Years active: 7 November 1964 to 31 May 2013
- Known for: Dubbing Molly Weasley in the Harry Potter series Zibelda in the Saragossa Manuscript
- Spouse(s): Krzysztof Chamiec (divorced); Stanisław Jędryka (divorced); Jerzy Chociłowski
- Awards: Grand Splendor award in 1995

Joanna Jędryka (born Stanisława Jędryka; born 1 January 1940, Trembowla) is a Polish film and theatre actress. She is a graduate of the Acting Department at the National Film School in Łódź in 1965 and stars in 38 different works.

Jędryka made her debut in 1965. She was associated with the Stefan Jaracz Theatre in Łódź from 1965 to 1968, the Ateneum Theatre in Warsaw from 1968 to 1980, and the Kwadrat Theatre from 1980 to 1988). She is currently starring in films, serials, theatre plays, radio plays, and television commercials.

In 1995, Jędryka was awarded the Grand Splendor award by the Polish Radio Theatre.
