= Michał Rosa =

Polish film director

Michał Rosa (born 27 September 1963 in Zabrze) is a Polish film director. He is a graduate from the Krzysztof Kieślowski Film School in Katowice.

== Filmography ==
- Gorący czwartek (1994)
- Farba (1998)
- Silence (2001)
- Co słonko widziało (2006)
- Scratch (2008)
- Szczęście Świata (2016)
- Piłsudski (2019)
