= Burial of a Potato =

1990 Polish film

- DVD cover
- Directed by: Jan Jakub Kolski
- Written by: Jan Jakub Kolski
- Produced by: Anna Gryczynska
- Starring: Franciszek Pieczka
- Cinematography: Wojciech Todorow
- Edited by: Ewa Pakulska
- Release date: October 1990
- Running time: 96 minutes
- Country: Poland
- Language: Polish

Burial of a Potato (Polish: Pogrzeb kartofla) is a 1990 Polish drama film directed by Jan Jakub Kolski. It was screened in the Un Certain Regard section at the 1991 Cannes Film Festival.

== Cast ==
- Franciszek Pieczka - Mateusz Szewczyk
- Adam Ferency - Stefan Gorzelak
- Mariusz Saniternik - Pasiasia
- Ewa Zukowska - Mierzwowa
- Grażyna Błęcka-Kolska - Dziedziczka Lachowiczowa
- Bogusław Sochnacki - Mazurek
- Grzegorz Herominski - Wladzio Rzepecki
- Feliks Szajnert - Antoni Andrzejewski
- Katarzyna Laniewska - Mazurkowa
- Irena Burawska - Kusidelka
- Henryk Niebudek - Kapitan
- Andrzej Jurczak - Mierzwa
- Krystyna Feldman - Matka Gorzelaka
- Joanna Jankowska-Hussakowska - Hanka
- Jan Jankowski - Jurek Szewczyk, Mateusz's son
- Lech Gwit - Geometra Franus
