= Andrzej Kondratiuk =

Polish film director (1936–2016)

- Born: 20 July 1936; Pinsk, Poland (now Belarus)
- Died: 22 June 2016 (aged 79); Warsaw, Poland
- Education: National Film School in Łódź
- Occupations: Flm director, screenwriter, actor, cinematographer
- Spouse: Iga Cembrzyńska

Andrzej Lech Kondratiuk (20 July 1936 – 22 June 2016) was a Polish film director, screenwriter, actor, and cinematographer.

== Biography ==
Kondratiuk graduated from the National Film School in Łódź in 1963.

Andrzej Kondratiuk created low-budget films, and, in scenarios, often used threads from his biography. He often selected actors and individuals from the immediate surroundings, including amateurs. Some of his films were created in Gzowo near Pułtusk.

Although some of his films, such as Wniebowzięci and Hydrozagadka, are classified as cult films and were often award-winning, they are not box office films. Many of his earlier films were short etudes.

== Private life ==
He was the older brother of film director Janusz Kondratiuk and was married to the actress Iga Cembrzyńska.

== Filmography ==
- 1963 – Kobiela na plaży
- 1963 – Niezawodny sposób
- 1965 – Monolog trębacza
- 1966 – Chciałbym się ogolić
- 1966 – Klub profesora Tutki
- 1967 – Fluidy
- 1970 – Hydrozagadka
- 1970 – Dziura w ziemi
- 1972 – Skorpion, Panna i Łucznik
- 1972 – Dziewczyny do wzięcia
- 1973 – Wniebowzięci
- 1973 – Jak to się robi
- 1976 – Czy jest tu panna na wydaniu?
- 1979 – Pełnia
- 1982 – Gwiezdny pył
- 1984 – Cztery pory roku
- 1986 – Big Bang
- 1990 – Mleczna droga
- 1991 – Ene... due... like... fake...
- 1993 – Wesoła noc smutnego biznesmena
- 1995 – Wrzeciono czasu
- 1997 – Słoneczny zegar
- 2000 – Pamiętnik filmowy Igi C.
- 2001 – Córa marnotrawna
- 2004 – Bar pod młynkiem
- 2007 – Pamiętnik Andrzeja Kondratiuka

Etudes from PWSF:

- 1958 – Juvenalia w Łodzi
- 1958 – Zakochany Pinokio
- 1959 – Dedykacja
- 1959 – Noe (scenariusz z M. Kijowskim)
- 1960 – Obrazki z podróży
