= Eike Besuden =

German TV presenter, documentary film director, screenwriter, film producer

Eike Besuden (born December 21, 1948, in Wildeshausen) is a German television presenter, director, screenwriter, and producer.

== Biography ==
Besuden grew up in East Frisia and attended high school for boys in Leer and Emden. After graduating from high school in Emden in 1970, he studied sociology and German studies and became a high school teacher in Bremen in 1976. At the same time, Besuden worked as an author, presenter, and editor for the radio station Radio Bremen from 1976 and as an author for documentaries and features on television from 1987.

He is also a presenter on the regional program of Radio Bremen buten un binnen.

In 1995, Besuden founded Geisberg Studios to produce documentaries.

In 2010, Geisberg Studios was renamed Pinguin Studios.

== Honors ==
In 2023, Eike Besuden was awarded the Villa Ichon Culture and Peace Prize for showing personalities who have been wronged in his films and for his commitment to better coexistence and humanity.
