= Prorok =

Prorok (Czech feminine: Proroková) is a surname. It means "prophet" in Czech, Polish, Serbo-Croatian, and related languages. Notable people with the surname include:

- Byron Khun de Prorok (1896–1954), American amateur archaeologist
- Ivo Prorok (born 1969), Czech ice hockey player
- Josef Prorok (born 1987), Czech track and field athlete
- Snežana Prorok (born 1994), Bosnian beauty pageant contestant
