= Wiesław Michnikowski =

Polish actor and cabaret performer

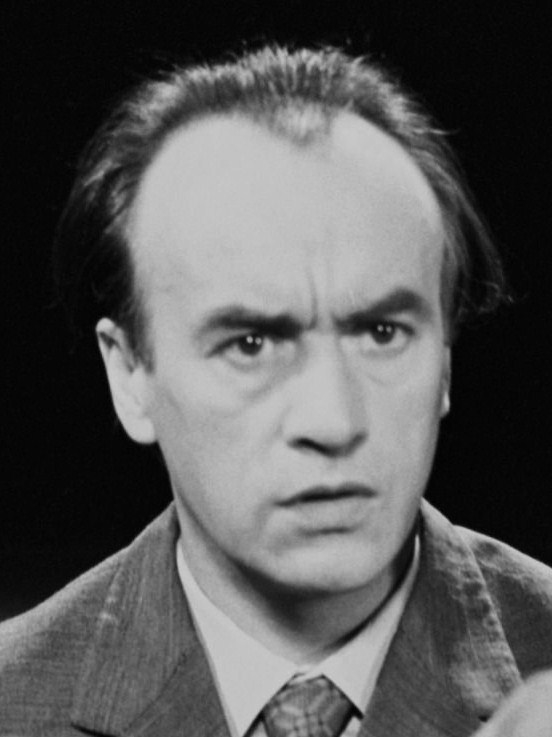
Wiesław Michnikowski

Wiesław Michnikowski (3 June 1922 in Warsaw – 29 September 2017 in Warsaw) was a Polish stage, cabaret, and film actor.

He performed at such satirical theaters (cabarets) as Kabaret Wagabunda, Kabaret Starszych Panów and Kabaret Dudek.

== Selected filmography ==
- Warszawska syrena (1956)
- Gangsterzy i filantropi (1963)
- Hydrozagadka (1970)
- Hallo Szpicbródka, czyli ostatni występ króla kasiarzy (1978)
- Głosy (1980) as priest Żółkiewski
- Sexmission (1983) as Her Excellency
- Akademia Pana Kleksa (1984)
- Podróże Pana Kleksa (1986)
- The Smurfs (1987) as Papa Smurf (voice, Polish dub)
- Skutki noszenia kapelusza w maju (1993)
- Cartoons All-Stars to the Rescue (1997) as Papa Smurf (voice, Polish dub)
