= A Bachelor's Life Abroad =

1992 Polish film

- Film poster
- Directed by: Andrzej Barański
- Written by: Jakub Wojciechowski; Andrzej Barański
- Starring: Marek Bukowski
- Cinematography: Ryszard Lenczewski
- Release date: 1992
- Running time: 108 minutes
- Country: Poland
- Language: Polish

A Bachelor's Life Abroad (Polish: Kawalerskie życie na obczyźnie) is a 1992 Polish comedy film directed by Andrzej Barański. It was entered into the 18th Moscow International Film Festival.

== Cast ==
- Marek Bukowski as Michal
- Bożena Dykiel as Frau Luther
- Magdalena Wójcik as Agata
- Artur Barciś as Stefan
- Jan Frycz as Herman
- Marek Walczewski as Carousel Owner Schumann
- Ewa Buczko as Angela
- Cynthia Kaszynska as Regina
- Jaroslaw Gruda as Franek
- Andrzej Mastalerz as Staszek
- Witold Wieliński as Wacek
