= The Faithful River (film) =

1987 film by Tadeusz Chmielewski

The Faithful River (Polish: Wierna rzeka) is a Polish historical film directed by Tadeusz Chmielewski. It was produced in 1983 and released in 1987.
