= Johnnie Waterman =

1993 Polish film

- DVD cover
- Directed by: Jan Jakub Kolski
- Written by: Jan Jakub Kolski
- Starring: Franciszek Pieczka
- Cinematography: Piotr Lenar
- Edited by: Ewa Pakulska
- Music by: Zygmunt Konieczny
- Release date: 17 February 1994
- Running time: 101 minutes
- Country: Poland
- Language: Polish

Johnnie Waterman (Polish: Jańcio Wodnik, also known as Johnnie the Aquarius) is a 1994 Polish drama film directed by Jan Jakub Kolski.

== Cast ==
Source.

- Franciszek Pieczka – Jańcio Wodnik
- Grażyna Błęcka-Kolska – Weronka
- Bogusław Linda – Stygma
- Katarzyna Aleksandrowicz – Oczyszczona
- Olgierd Łukaszewicz – Dziad
- Wieslaw Cichy – Umarlak
- Renata Palys – Zona Umarlaka
- Henryk Niebudek – Chlop
- Malgorzata Kaluzinska – Czarnowlosa
- Kazimierz Krzaczkowski – Ojciec Oczyszczonej
- Katarzyna Kurylonska – Dziewczyna Stygmy
- Mariusz Kilian – Pastuch
- Lech Gwit – Socha
- Izabela Kwinta-Kolakowska – Wiejska Dziewczyna

== Release and reception ==
It was screened in the Un Certain Regard section at the 1994 Cannes Film Festival. It won the Findling Award in Cottbus. At the 1993 Polish Film Festival the film received Special Jury Prize, award for best actor (Pieczka) and journalists' award.
