= Zdzisław Maklakiewicz =

Polish actor (1927–1977)

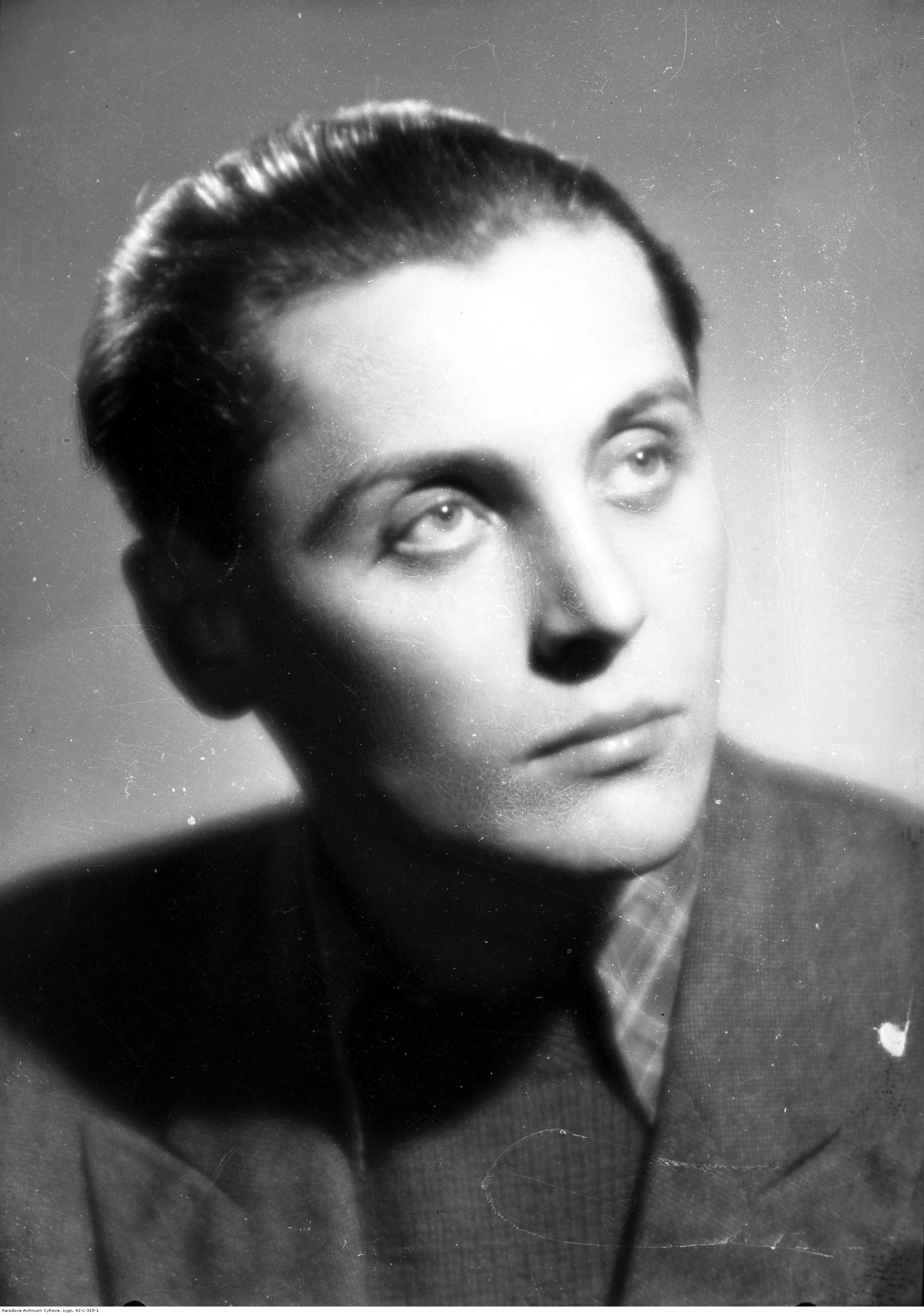
Zdzisław Maklakiewicz

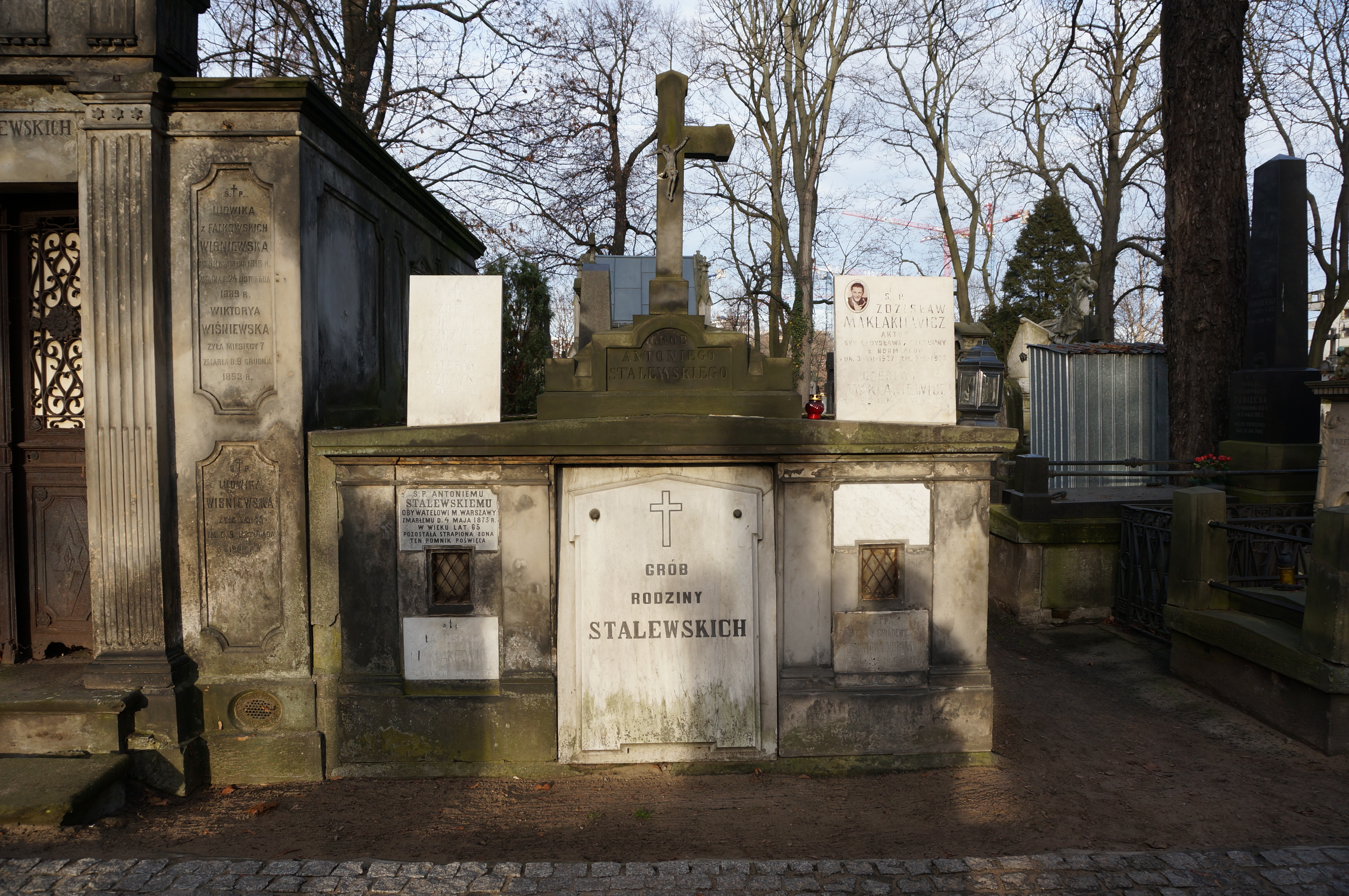
Grave of Zdzisław Maklakiewicz at Powązki Cemetery in Warsaw

Zdzisław Maklakiewicz (9 July 1927 in Warsaw – 9 October 1977) was a Polish actor. He was the nephew of composers Jan and Tadeusz Maklakiewicz.

== Biography ==
During World War II, Maklakiewicz served in the Home Army. He took part in the Warsaw Uprising (using the pseudonym of "Hanzen"), fighting in the city center as a gunner in the motorized company "Iskra" battalion "Kiliński". After the capitulation of Warsaw, he was taken to a German POW camp (Stalag XVIII-C Markt Pongau, no POW: 105022), from where he returned to Poland in September 1945.

In 1947 he began studying acting in Kraków, then in the Theatre Academy in Warsaw, graduating in 1950. He tried to study directing, but did not complete these studies. He was an actor in the Theatre Syrena, the Polish Theatre in Warsaw, and the Ludowy Theatre. From 1958 to 1962, he was an actor in the Coastal Theatre in Gdansk. From 1962 to 1964, he was also an actor in the Chamber Theatre and in the Polish Theatre in Wroclaw. In 1967-69 - the Helena Modrzejewska National Stary Theater in Kraków, and in the seventies, the National Theatre in Warsaw and the TR Warszawa.

He married Polish actor Renata Firek, with whom he had a daughter, Marta. In many movies, he played together with Jan Himilsbach and Andrzej Kondratiuk, with whom he was close friends.

Maklakiewicz suffered from alcohol abuse. In October 1977, while intoxicated, he was beaten in the vicinity of the Hotel Europejski in Warsaw by police. He died a few days after the beating.

On 2 August 2009, former Polish president Lech Kaczyński posthumously awarded Maklakiewicz the Officer's Cross of the Order of Polonia Restituta for outstanding contributions to the independence of the Polish Republic and for his achievements in the activities for the development of Polish culture.
