= Jan Jakub Kolski =

Polish film director (born 1956)

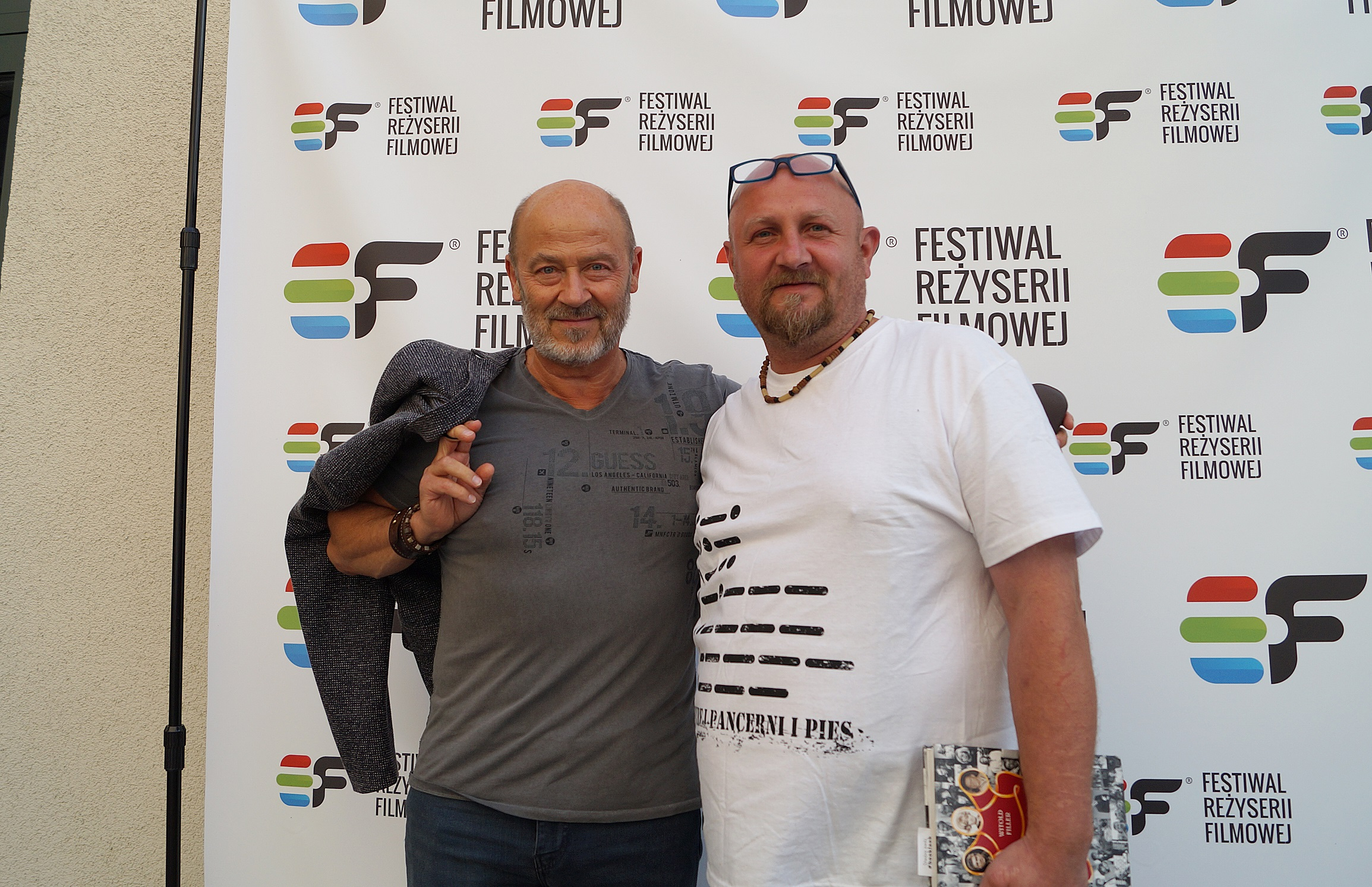
- Jan Jakub Kolski, 2018
- Born: 29 January 1956 (age 70); Wrocław, Poland
- Occupations: film director, writer

Jan Jakub Kolski (born 29 January 1956) is a Polish film director, cinematographer, and writer.

== Early life and career ==
Kolski was born in Wrocław, and comes from a family closely connected to cinema. His father, Roman Kolski, and his sister, Ewa Pakulska were film editors. His brother, Włodzimierz Kolski, is a production manager. His paternal grandfather was a film producer. Kolski's wife, Grażyna Błęcka-Kolska is an actress. From age eleven until age fourteen, Kolski lived in a small village, Popielawy, near Tomaszów Mazowiecki and Łódź. Those years became the inspiration for his later films. During the late 1970s, he worked his way through the ranks at a TV station in his home town, ending up as chief director of photography. He then studied cinematography at the famous Film School in Łódź, where he now runs a screenplay workshop. In 2007 he gained his doctoral degree in film art. He's also a lecturer at Andrzej Wajda Master School of Film Directing.

== Works ==
During the 1980s, Kolski made about twenty short films, including Umieranko (A Little Dying); Najpiękniejsza jaskinia świata (The Most Beautiful Cave in the World); Mały dekalog (The Little Ten Commandments), Nie zasmucę serca twego (I Won't Make You Sad), Jak mnie kochasz (How Do You Love Me?), Szkoła przetrwania (The Survival School), Pałkiewicz ma rację (Palkiewicz Is Right), Słowiański świt (The Dawn of the Slavonic Tribes), Ładny dzień (A Nice Day), Idź (Walk). The shorts won many awards in Poland. Many of Kolski's short films documented his passion for mountain climbing and speleology, which earned him a nickname 'The Stuntman of the Polish cinematography'. More recently, Kolski created three film diaries: Zobaczyc jak najwiecej (To see everything), Gdzie jestes Paititi? (Where are you, Paititi?) and Między rajem a ziemią (Between Paradise and Earth) during his journeys to Asia and South America.

Kolski's first feature, Pogrzeb kartofla (The Burial of a Potato), was shot in Popielawy in 1990, and was based on a real story of Kolski's maternal grandfather, Jakub Szewczyk. In that movie, as well as in his subsequent films, Kolski employed his own vision of the world enriched with magic, and is considered to be the founder of the 'magical realism' trend in Polish film making. Since then, Kolski has made many more films, most of them located in the same village or mythical countryside. Among those films are: Pograbek (A Knacker); Magneto; Jańcio Wodnik (Johnnie Aquarius aka Johnnie Waterman); Cudowne miejsce (A Miraculous Place); Grający z talerza (Playing from the Plate); Szabla od komendanta (The Commander's Sword aka Legacy of Steel); and Historia kina w Popielawach (The History of Cinema in Popielawy), which were all based on Kolski's own script. In 1994 Jańcio Wodnik won the Findling Award at the Filmfestival Cottbus.

Daleko od okna (Keep Away from the Window), made in 2000, opened a new chapter in Kolski's filmography. The screenplay by Cezary Harasimowicz was based on a real-life story written by Hanna Krall, famous for writing about the Holocaust. His next work, Pornografia (Pornography) was in turn based on the novel with the same title by Witold Gombrowicz. The next two Jasminum and Afonia i pszczoły (Afonia and Honeybees) were based on his own original screenplays, whereas Wenecja (Venice), his latest movie, is based on a short story by Włodzimierz Odojewski.

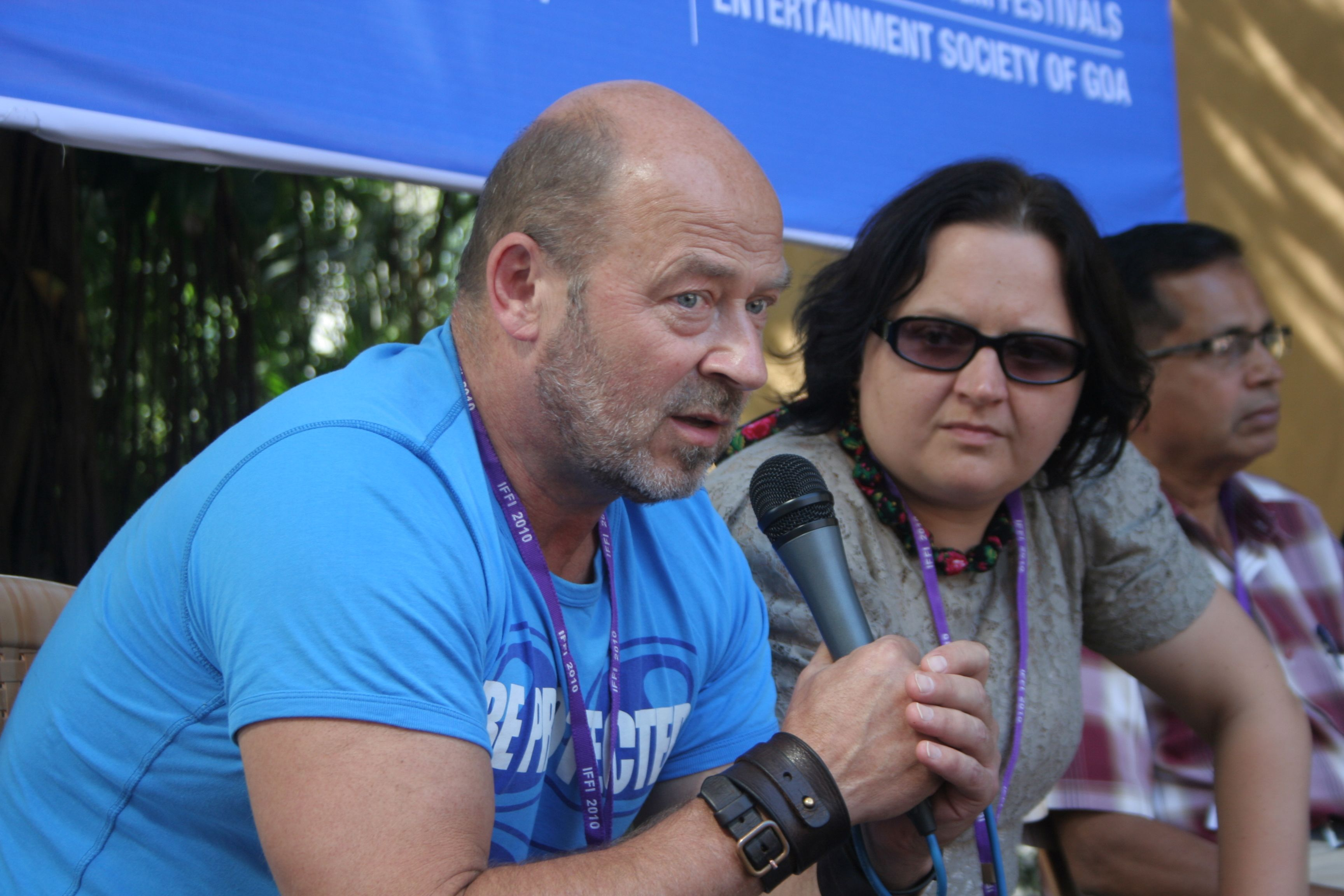
Jan Jakub Kolski in 2010

Kolski continued to work with television, and many of his films and other works were made for the medium. He wrote several plays for television, including Bajka o bardzo lekkim chlebie (A Fable of the Very Light Bread), Skrzypki (The Fiddles), Noga dla Józefa (A Leg for Jozef), and Kamera marzen (The Dream Camera), which were primarily addressed to children. Others, such as Wyspa róż (The Rose Island) and Diabeł przewrotny (Again the Devil), were Kolski's adaptations of original plays. Kolski also directed several commercials, video clips, and one television series, Małopole, czyli świat (Malopole, or the World), in which he returns to the life in the countryside.

Kolski's literary output includes short stories collected in two books – Jańcio Wodnik i inne nowele (Johnnie Aquarius and Other Stories), and Mikroświaty (Microworlds); a novel, Kulka z chleba (A Bread Pellet); and a book for children, Jadzia i małoludki (Jadzia and The Little People).

Kolski has won many awards in Poland and abroad. Among his major international successes is the Special Award at The Film Festival in Tokyo in 1995 for his Grający z talerza (Playing from the Plate). In 2000, he also became a member of the European Film Academy. His 2000 film Keep Away from the Window was entered into the 23rd Moscow International Film Festival.

== Filmography ==
=== School works ===
- Odrobina bólu (A Bit of Pain) (1982) – Photography
- Inauguracja 82 (Inauguration '82) (1983) – Director, photography
- Za górami (Across the mountains) (1983) – Photography
- Red Box (1984) – Collaboration
- Umieranko (A Little Dying) (1984) – Director, photography

=== Shorts ===
- Najpiękniejsza jaskinia świata (The Most Beautiful Cave in the World) (1983) – Director, script, voice-over, photography
- Mały dekalog (The Little Ten Commandments) (1983) – Information not available
- Nie zasmucę serca twego (I Won't Make You Sad) (1984) – Information not available
- Jak mnie kochasz (How Do You Love Me?) (1985) – Information not available
- Człowiek z ulicy Zielonej Gęsi (A Man from the Zielona Ges Street) (1986) – Photography
- Słowiański świt. Początki Polski w Dzieje kultury polskiej [WFO] (The Dawn of the Slavonic Tribes) (1986) – Director, screenplay, photography
- Rekwizyty Wiesława Garbolińskiego (Wieslaw Garbolinski's Props) (1987) – Photography
- Trzy tematy Leszka Rózgi (Three Topics of Leszek Rozga) (1987) – Photography
- Ładny dzień (A Nice Day) (1988) – Screenplay, director, photography, art director
- Pałkiewicz ma rację (Palkiewicz Is Right) (1988) – Director, script, photography
- Szkoła przetrwania (The Survival School) (1988) – Director, script, photography
- Idź (Walk) (1989) – Photography
- Piosenki polne i okoliczne (Songs from the Fields and Near-bys) (1996) – Director, script
- Videoclips for songs from ojDADAna, a music album by Grzegorz Ciechowski
- Zobaczyć jak najwięcej (To See Everything) (2001) – Director, script, photography
- Gdzie jesteś Paitii? (Where Are You, Paititi?) (2002) – Director, script, photography
- Między rajem a ziemią (Between the Paradise and Earth)

=== Features ===
- Pogrzeb kartofla (The Burial of a Potato) (1990) imdb
- Pograbek (A Knacker) (1992) imdb
- Magneto (1993) imdb
- Jańcio Wodnik (Johnnie Aquarius aka Johnnie Waterman) (1993) imdb
- Cudowne miejsce (A Miraculous Place) (1994) imdb
- Grający z talerza (Playing from the Plate) (1995) imdb
- Szabla od komendanta (The Commander's Sword aka Legacy of Steel) (1995) imdb
- Historia kina w Popielawach (The History of Cinema in Popielawy) (1998) imdb
- Daleko od okna (Keep Away From The Window) (2000)
- Małopole czyli świat (Malopole, Or The World) 2000 – 2001 TV series
- Pornografia (Pornography) (2002) imdb
- Jaśminum (Jasminum) (2006) imdb
- Afonia i pszczoly (Afonia and Honeybees) (2009)
- Wenecja (Venice) (2010)

=== Television theatre plays ===
- Diabeł przewrotny (Again the Devil) (1997) – Adaptation and director
- Bajka o bardzo lekkim chlebie (A Fable of the Very Light Bread) (1997) – Screenplay and director
- Noga dla Józefa (A Leg for Jozef) (1997) – Screenplay
- Wyspa róż (The Rose Island) (1998) – Director
- Skrzypki (The Fiddles) (1999) – Screenplay and director
- Kamera marzeń (The Dream Camera) (2001) – Screenplay and director
