= Janusz Gajos =

Polish actor (born 1939)

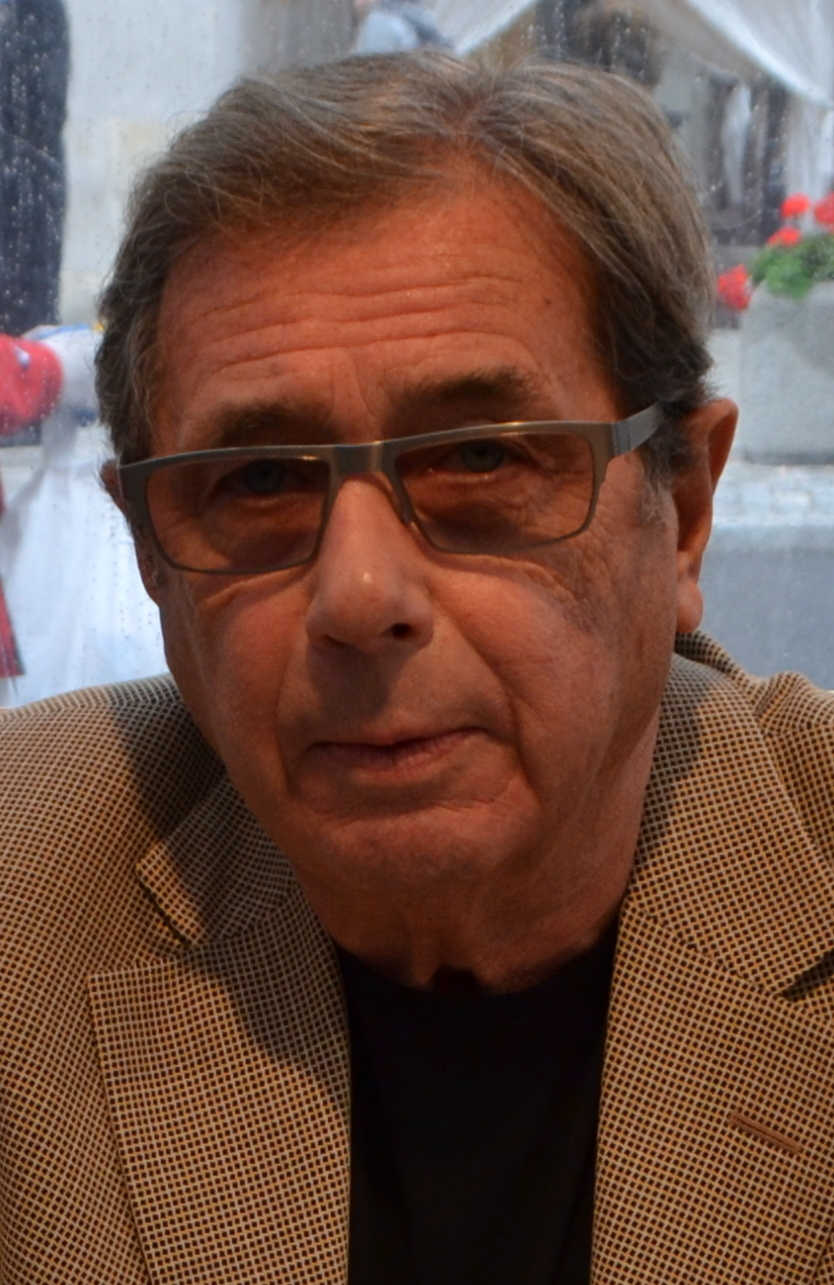
- Gajos in 2015
- Born: 23 September 1939 (age 86); Dąbrowa Górnicza, Poland
- Education: National Film School in Łódź
- Occupations: Film actor; stage actor; pedagogue
- Years active: 1964–present
- Spouse: Elżbieta Brożek

Janusz Gajos (Polish pronunciation: [ˈjanuʂ ˈɡajɔs]; born 23 September 1939) is a Polish film, television and theatre actor as well as pedagogue and photographer. Professor of Theatre Arts and an Honorary Doctor of the National Film School in Łódź, he is considered one of the greatest Polish actors.

He is the recipient of numerous awards and honours including the Gold Cross of Merit (1974), Gloria Artis Medal for Merit to Culture (2007), five Polish Film Awards (2001, 2007, 2016, 2016, 2019), Commander's Cross with Star of the Order of Polonia Restituta (2011), and Diamond Lions Award at the Gdynia Film Festival (2015).

== Life and career ==
He was born in Dąbrowa Górnicza. At the age of 11, he moved to Będzin where in 1957, he graduated from the High School No 3. In 1965 he graduated from the National Film School in Łódź as one of its best students despite having been rejected during entrance exams three times. He debuted while he was still in film school in children's film Panienka z okienka directed by Maria Kaniewska in 1964. Shortly afterwards he was cast in a role of Janek Kos in a widely popular TV World War II series Czterej pancerni i pies (Four Tank Men and a Dog). He starred in numerous other films and theatrical plays, notably in Krzysztof Kieślowski's Three Colors: White, Ryszard Bugajski's Interrogation, Andrzej Wajda's Man of Marble, Wojciech Marczewski's Escape from the 'Liberty' Cinema, Władysław Pasikowski's Pigs, Andrzej Wajda's The Revenge, Małgorzata Szumowska's Body and Wojciech Smarzowski's Clergy.

He performed in numerous theatres throughout his acting career including Stefan Jaracz Theatre in Łódź as well as the Komedia Theatre, Polish Theatre, Kwadrat, the Dramatic Theatre and the National Theatre in Warsaw. In 2003, he became an academic teacher at the National Film School in Łódź. He is also known for performing in popular Olga Lipińska's Cabaret.

In 2010, he officially endorsed the candidacy of Bronisław Komorowski in the 2010 Polish Presidential Elections as well as the 2015 Polish Presidential Elections.

In 2007, he received the Golden Medal for Merit to Culture – Gloria Artis. In 2011, he was awarded the Commander's Cross with Star of the Order of Polonia Restituta. He is a five-time winner of the Polish Film Awards including the Polish Film Award for Lifetime Achievement in 2016.

== Filmography ==
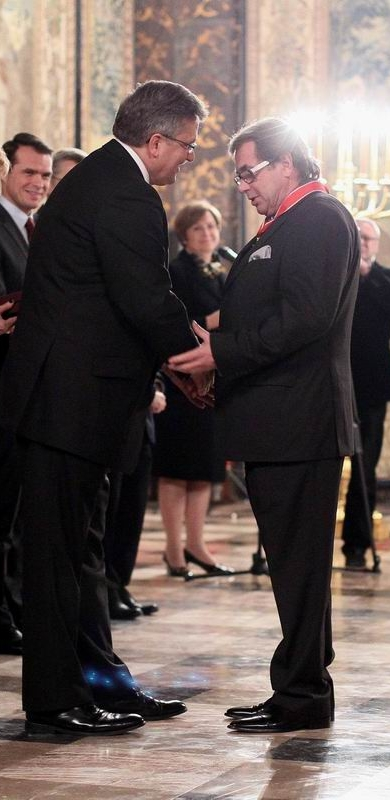
Janusz Gajos accepting the Commander's Cross with Star of the Order of Polonia Restituta from President Bronisław Komorowski, 2011

- Solid Gold (2019), as CBŚ officer Nowicki
- Clergy (2018), as archbishop Mordowicz
- Kamerdyner (2018), as Bazyli Miotke
- Breaking the Limits (2017)
- Blindness (2016)
- Body (2015)
- The Closed Circuit as Andrzej Kostrzewa
- Ekipa, as former Prime Minister Henryk Nowasz
- Jasminum (2006) as monk Zdrówko
- Pitbull (2005)
- Hamlet (2004/II) (TV), as Claudius
- Treasure Planet (2002), as John Silver (voice, Polish Dub)
- Zemsta (2002) a.k.a. The Revenge, as Cześnik Maciej Raptusiewicz
- Chopin: Desire for Love (2002), as Grand Duke Constantine Pavlovich Romanov:
- Tam i z powrotem (2002) a.k.a. There and Back, as Andrzej Hoffman
- Przedwiośnie (2001) a.k.a. The Spring to Come, as Seweryn Baryka, father of Cezary
- Weiser (2001), as Antiquarian
- Żółty szalik (2000) (TV)
- To ja, złodziej (2000) a.k.a. It's Me, the Thief, as Roman Wyskocz
- Ostatnia misja (2000) a.k.a. The Last Mission, as Police Inspector
- Egzekutor (1999), as Kowalik
- Fuks (1999), as Policeman
- Szczęśliwego Nowego Jorku (1997) a.k.a. Happy New York, as Professor
- Czas zdrady (1997), as Messer Niccolo
- Poznań 56 (1996), as Professor
- Revenge of the Musketeers (1994), as D'Artagnan (voice, Polish Dub)
- Akwarium (1996) as Nikolay Kravcov
- Łagodna (1995) a.k.a. A Gentle Woman, as He
- Śmierć jak kromka chleba (1994) a.k.a. Death like a Slice of Bread, as Miodek
- Three Colors: White (1994), as Mikołaj
- Straszny sen Dzidziusia Górkiewicza (1993) a.k.a. The Terrible Dream of Babyface Gorkiewicz
- Szwadron (1993) a.k.a. Squadron
- Coupable d'innocence (1992) a.k.a. When Reason Sleeps
- Pigs (1992), as Major SB "Siwy" Gross
- Escape from the 'Liberty' Cinema (1991), as Cenzor
- Stan wewnętrzny (1990) a.k.a. Inner State
- Dekalog (1989) a.k.a. The Decalogue (mini) TV Series, as Michał
- Piłkarski poker (1989) a.k.a. Soccer Poker, as Referee Jan Laguna
- Dekalog, cztery (1988) (TV) a.k.a. Honor Thy Father and Thy Mother, as Michał
- Big Bang (1986) (TV), as Janek
- Hamlet we wsi Głucha Dolna (1985) (TV)
- Rok spokojnego słońca (1984) a.k.a. The Year of the Quiet Sun, as Moonlighter
- Wedle wyroków twoich... (1984) a.k.a. After Your Decrees, as Driver
- Alternatywy 4 (1983) TV Series, as Jan Winnicki
- Gwiezdny pył (1982)
- Limuzyna Daimler-Benz (1982) a.k.a. The Consul, as Kuschmerek
- Nieciekawa historia (1982) a.k.a. Uninteresting Story
- Interrogation (1982) a.k.a. Interrogation, as Major UB "Kąpielowy" Zawada
- From a Far Country (1981) a.k.a. Z dalekiego kraju
- Man of Iron (1981) a.k.a. Man of Iron, as Committee vice-chairman
- Wahadełko (1981) a.k.a. Shilly-Shally
- The War of the Worlds: Next Century (1981)
- The Orchestra Conductor (1980), as High Official
- Kontrakt (1980) a.k.a. The Contract, as Bolesław Bartoszuk
- Kung-Fu (1979), as Editor-in-Chief Maciek
- What Will You Do When You Catch Me? (1978), as Supermarket Manager
- Milioner (1978) a.k.a. Millionaire, as Józef Mikuła
- Mgła (1976) a.k.a. The Fog
- Wakacje z duchami (1970) TV Series, as Antoniusz
- Bicz boży (1967) a.k.a. God's Whip, as Kleń
- Stajnia na Salwatorze (1967) a.k.a. Stall on Salvador
- Barrier (1966) (uncredited), as Tram Driver with Letter "E"
- Czterej pancerni i pies (1966) TV Series, as Pvt./Cpl./Sgt./Lt. Jan Kos
- The Codes (1966), as White monk
- Panienka z okienka (1964)

== See also ==
- Polish cinema
- Gdynia Film Festival
- Polish Film Awards
