= Apel (film) =

1970 film by Ryszard Czekała

- Screenshot from the film
- Directed by: Ryszard Czekała
- Written by: Ryszard Czekała
- Produced by: Magda Barycz
- Cinematography: Jan Tkaczyk
- Music by: Ryszard Sulewski
- Production company: Studio Miniatur Filmowych
- Release date: 1970
- Running time: 7 minutes
- Country: Poland
- Language: German

Apel (Polish pronunciation: [ˈa.pɛl], variously translated as The Appeal and The Roll-Call) is a 1970 black-and-white cutout animated short film by Ryszard Czekała.

The film is about World War II and the Nazi occupation of Poland: during the morning roll call, a group of concentration camp prisoners are tormented by an SS officer who orders them to perform gymnastic exercises. The prisoners are shot when they rebel against obeying orders.

== Plot ==
A train arrives, and the sound of numerous people running can be heard. The crowd comes to a standstill and it can be seen that they are Polish concentration camp prisoners. The crowd stands in front of an SS officer who gives them the orders "Up" (German: Auf) and "Down" (German: Nieder). First, the crowd obeys these commands. Suddenly, however, one man stops as the rest kneel down. When the man repeatedly refuses to obey the order "down", the SS officer shoots him. Then all the prisoners stand up together. The SS officer gives the order to fire and all prisoners are shot. At the end a man stops and the SS officer walks over to him. The prisoner begins to alternate between standing up and going down. Finally, the SS officer shoots him anyway.

== Production ==
Apel was written and directed by Ryszard Czekała and was made using black-and-white cutout animation. It was produced by the Krakow Branch of Studio Miniatur Filmowych in Warsaw, with Magda Barycz serving as production manager. Jan Tkaczyk completed the film's photography and Ryszard Sulewski completed the film's sound.

== Style and themes ==
The film's black-and-white cut-out animation style has drawn comparison to the reporting style in documentary films. The visual repetition of the uniform stripes on the crowd's prison uniforms has also been said to express the emotional effects of dehumanization. Apel has been called a neorealist film.

== Release ==
Apel was released in 1970 and promoted by Poland as a film about the martyrs of the Nazi concentration camps.

Before the film's release, the Nazi concentration camp was considered an inappropriate subject matter for animated films at the time. Apel has been called "the first animated film in Eastern Europe to directly depict the concentration camps".

== Reception ==
Apel was praised in Poland, with film critic Jerzy Giżycki favorably comparing it to The Last Stage (1947) and Passenger (1963). In his book Polish Film and the Holocaust: Politics and Memory, Marek Haltof called Apel "one of the most unusual films ever made in Poland".

Apel was awarded the Grand Prix at the Annecy International Animation Film Festival in 1971 in a three-way tie with the Yugoslavian short film The Bride and the American short film The Further Adventures of Uncle Sam.

The film also won the Bronze Hobby-Horse (Lajkonik) at the 1971 Kraków Film Festival. At the 50th Kraków Film Festival in 2010, Apel was selected for screening with nineteen other films–ten Polish films and ten foreign films deemed the best from the festival's history, as selected by seven film critics. Apel was also screened the same year at the 35th Polish Film Festival in Gdynia.

== Awards ==
- 1971 – Grand Prix at the Annecy International Animation Film Festival
- 1971 – Bronze Hobby-Horse (Lajkonik) at the Kraków Film Festival
