= Egzekutor =

- Directed by: Filip Zylber
- Written by: Mariusz Gawryś
- Produced by: Wiesław Łysakowski
- Starring: Rafał Mohr; Jan Frycz; Janusz Gajos
- Cinematography: Jarosław Szoda
- Edited by: Katarzyna Rudnik
- Music by: Tomasz Stańko
- Production companies: Akson Studio; Canal+ Poland; Cinematography Committee; Agencja Produkcji Filmowej; Warsaw Documentary Film Studio
- Distributed by: ITI Cinema
- Release date: 22 October 1999
- Running time: 107 minutes
- Country: Poland
- Language: Polish

Egzekutor (Polish: [ɛɡ.zɛˈku.tɔr]; lit. 'The Executor') is a 1999 Polish-language drama thriller film directed by Filip Zylber, written by Mariusz Gawryś, and produced by Wiesław Łysakowski. It premiered on 22 October 1999.

== Plot ==
Alex, a young student, falls in love with Maja, a fellow student, and girlfriend of rich Kowalik. Alex has a brother Wiktor, who is in jail for stealing Kowalik's money. As part of internship, Alex takes care of elderly Franciszek Kozar, who one day, offers him 16,000 United States dollars if he kills him. Alex is hesitant, however, he decides to do it. He decides to begin a business, offering euthanasia to people.

== Cast ==
- Rafał Mohr as Alex
- Teresa Marczewska as Alex's mother
- Jan Frycz as Wiktor
- Paulina Kinaszewska as Maja
- Janusz Gajos as Kowalik
- Piotr Adamczyk as a physician
- Jerzy Nowak as Franciszek Kozar
- Tadeusz Szymków as Napalony
- Borys Jaźnicki as a club employee

== Production ==
The film was directed Filip Zylber, written by Mariusz Gawryś, and produced by Wiesław Łysakowski. The cinematography was done by Jarosław Szoda, music by Tomasz Stańko, editing by Katarzyna Rudnik, and scenography by Anna Brodnicka, editing by Katarzyna Rudnik. The main cast included: Rafał Mohr, Jan Frycz, and Janusz Gajos. The film was produced by Akson Studio, Canal+ Poland, * Cinematography Committee, Agencja Produkcji Filmowej, and Warsaw Documentary Film Studio, and distributed by ITI Cinema. It was filmed in Poland. The film premiered on 22 October 1999.
