= Jerzy Zieliński (cinematographer) =

Polish cinematographer

- Born: Jerzy Karol Zieliński; January 8, 1950 (age 76); Szczecin, Poland
- Occupation: Cinematographer
- Years active: 1971–2018

Jerzy Karol Zieliński (Polish pronunciation: [jɛʐɨ karɔl ʑɛ'liɲskʲi], born January 8, 1950) is a Polish retired cinematographer.

== Filmography ==
=== Feature film ===
Year	Title	Director	Notes
1976	Kradzież	Piotr Andrejew	
1980	Wizja lokalna 1901	Filip Bajon	
1981	Czułe miejsca	Piotr Andrejew	
1981	Shivers	Wojciech Marczewski	
1982	Limuzyna Daimler-Benz	Filip Bajon	
1984	Cal	Pat O'Connor	
1985	Medium	Jacek Koprowicz	With Wit Dąbal
1985	Przeznaczenie	Jacek Koprowicz	
1986	Flight of the Spruce Goose	Lech Majewski	
1988	Stars and Bars	Pat O'Connor	
1988	In a Shallow Grave	Kenneth Bowser	
1989	The January Man	Pat O'Connor	
1989	Valentino Returns	Peter Hoffman	
1990	Fools of Fortune	Pat O'Connor	
1990	Escape from the 'Liberty' Cinema	Wojciech Marczewski	
1991	Paradise	Mary Agnes Donoghue	
1993	Swing Kids	Thomas Carter	
1995	Houseguest	Randall Miller	
1995	Powder	Victor Salva	
1997	That Darn Cat	Bob Spiers	
1997	Washington Square	Agnieszka Holland	
1998	Home Fries	Dean Parisot	
1999	Teaching Mrs. Tingle	Kevin Williamson	
1999	The Third Miracle	Agnieszka Holland	
1999	Galaxy Quest	Dean Parisot	
2001	Bubble Boy	Blair Hayes	
2001	Who Is Cletis Tout?	Chris Ver Wiel	
2003	The Lizzie McGuire Movie	Jim Fall	
2004	Dodgeball: A True Underdog Story	Rawson Marshall Thurber	
2004	The SpongeBob SquarePants Movie	Mark Osborne	Live-action scenes
2005	Fun with Dick and Jane	Dean Parisot	
2008	The Lazarus Project	John Glenn	
2011	Baby sa jakies inne	Marek Koterski	
2012	Private Peaceful	Pat O'Connor	
2015	Letnie przesilenie	Michał Rogalski	
2018	7 uczuć	Marek Koterski	

=== Television ===
TV movies

Year	Title	Director
1977	Romans prowincjonalny	Krzysztof Wierzbianski
1978	Wejscie w nurt	Barbara Sass
1979	Niewdziecznosc	Zbigniew Kaminski
1980	Klucznik	Wojciech Marczewski
1980	Zielona ziemia	Filip Bajon
1996	Little Surprises	Jeff Goldblum
1999	A.T.F.	Dean Parisot
2009	The Courageous Heart of Irena Sendler	John Kent Harrison
2009	See Kate Run	Dean Parisot

TV series

Year	Title	Director	Notes
1984	40 Minutes	Witold Starecki	Episode "Asylum"
2001	The Job	Dean Parisot	Episode "Pilot"
2002	Monk	Dean Parisot	Episode "Mr. Monk and the Candidate"
2016	Miranda's Rights		Episode "Pilot"
2018	Good Girls	Dean Parisot; So Yong Kim; Nzingha Stewart; Sarah Pia Anderson	6 episodes

== Awards ==
- Nominated 2009 ASC Awards - Outstanding Achievement in Cinematography in Motion Picture/Mini-Series Television: (The Courageous Heart of Irena Sendler)
- Won 1981 Kraków Film Festival - Best Cinematography (The Primer)
