= Cinematography Committee =

State legal entity established in 1987

Cinematography Committee (Polish: Komitet Kinematografii) was a state legal entity established in 1987. It supervised, among others, Documentary and Feature Film Studios. It produced several films, including Egzekutor. Its chair were: Jerzy Bajdor (1987–1989), Juliusz Burski (1989–1990), Waldemar Dąbrowski (1990–1994), Tadeusz Ścibor-Rylski (1994–2001) and Janusz Bodasiński (2001). Its members included Bohdan Poręba and Ryszard Ber.
