= Interrogation (1982 film) =

1982 Polish film about false imprisonment by Ryszard Bugajski

- DVD cover
- Directed by: Ryszard Bugajski
- Written by: Ryszard Bugajski; Janusz Dymek
- Produced by: Tadeusz Drewno; Andrzej Wajda
- Starring: Krystyna Janda; Adam Ferency; Janusz Gajos
- Cinematography: Jacek Petrycki
- Edited by: Katarzyna Maciejko-Kowalczyk
- Production company: Zespól Filmowy "X"
- Release date: 13 December 1989
- Running time: 118 minutes
- Country: Poland
- Language: Polish

Interrogation (Polish: Przesłuchanie) is a Polish film about false imprisonment under the Stalinist pro-Soviet Polish regime in the early 1950s. Completed in 1982, the film was directed by Ryszard Bugajski and first released in 1989. The plot follows an ordinary, apolitical woman named Tonia, played by Krystyna Janda. She refuses to cooperate with the abusive system and its officials, who are trying to force her to incriminate a former incidental lover, now an accused political prisoner.

Due to its criticism of the regime, the Polish communist government banned the film from public viewing for over seven years, until the 1989 dissolution of the Eastern Bloc allowed it to see the light of day. Despite the film's controversial initial reception and subsequent banning, it gained a cult fanbase through the circulation of illegally taped VHS copies, which director Ryszard Bugajski secretly helped to leak to the general public.

The film had its first theatrical release in December 1989 in Poland and was entered into the 1990 Cannes Film Festival, where Krystyna Janda won the award for Best Actress and the film was nominated for the Palme d'Or.

== Plot ==
Set in 1951, the film centres around Tonia, a cabaret singer in Stalinist Poland. One evening after she performs for soldiers, she quarrels with her husband who she feels has been too friendly with her best friend. Frustrated, she accepts an invitation from two strangers to go out for a drink. The two men then proceed to intentionally get her drunk. They say they will take her home by car, but instead, she is driven to a political military prison to be arrested, imprisoned and interrogated, without being told why.

Over the course of several years, she is humiliated and bullied by prison officials with the intention of forcing her to sign false confessions. After refusing to sign a false confession which denounces a friend, she is taken to the shower block in the basement and placed in a tiny barred cell. The water is turned on and the room slowly floods. She is released at the last moment and told to sign the confession form again, but again refuses. Another episode sees her interrogators stage a scene where a man is supposedly executed for refusing to confess. They then confront Tonia and threaten to shoot her as well is she continues to refuse. She doesn't relent, and appears to accept death. In the commotion that follows, she realises that the man was still alive. He was an actor, and her interrogator's charade is revealed.

After continually demanding to see her husband, he is finally allowed to visit. Before seeing Tonia, he is told by the officials of the infidelities she had been forced to reveal. In their brief encounter he confronts Tonia about these infidelities and demands an explanation from her. When she remains silent, he renounces her and tells her that he does not want to see her again. Immediately following this, she unsuccessfully attempts suicide. While recovering in the prison's hospital, one of her interrogators takes an interest in her recovery. She repeatedly tells him of the absurdity of the system in which he believes and he seems sympathetic to her situation. The two form a brief romantic relationship, and after a single sexual encounter, she becomes pregnant by him. Like other female inmates, she is forced to give up her child for adoption soon after she gives birth. Later, the father of the child meets with Tonia to inform her that he has secured her release. He also gives her instructions on how to reclaim their child. He then commits suicide.

After being released, Tonia visits the orphanage where her daughter had been living. The girl, now a toddler, does not recognise her mother. Tonia and her daughter leave the orphanage together and make their way towards her husband's home. Her daughter appears to recognise the place and rushes ahead, calling out "father". This suggests that her husband had been raising the child in her stead.

== Production and release ==
The film was directed by Ryszard Bugajski and produced by the film studio Zespół Filmowy "X”. Production began in 1981 and was completed in 1982. Its original version contained scenes set in the modern era, wherein the protagonist's daughter attempts to uncover the truth of her mother's past, as covered in the main plot. This "contemporary theme" was considered politically dangerous by the government of Poland at the time. As such, the Ministry of Culture convened a co-laudation commission to debate whether the film should be released to the public, as was common procedure with controversial films at the time. The majority of the commission called the film "propagandistic" and argued that it made an overly political statement about the past which tied this criticism to the current regime. After seeing the film, one of the members of the commission commented:

"We had an obvious example of art today, cinematic art, that cannot, in this situation, be released right away, as it was proposed here. This film is so shocking and the context is so strong, so strongly tied to the present, independent of the intentions of its creators. (...) A mass audience will react to this film unequivocally as, how shall I say, the breaking of human beings by people in Polish uniforms."

— Professor Golebiowski, University of Warsaw

At the commission's suggestion, the Minister of Culture forbade the film's release for fear of how the public would react. It was one of many "shelf-films" (Polish: półkowniki) which were archived and only presented to the public following the Revolutions of 1989. The version of the film that was released had removed the contemporary timeline from the film in an effort to make it a purely historical work without references to the current political crisis.

When it was shown at the 1990 Cannes Film Festival, it was both applauded and criticised. Krystyna Janda, the film's lead actress, was awarded as best actress, but some called her performance overly dramatic and criticised the film for not being historically realistic. In reality, the film's director had taken great care in researching the imprisonment of women in Stalinist Poland that he depicted. In an interview, Janda stated that,

The story was really based on the lives of two real women who lived through the Stalinist hell: Tonia Lechmann and Wanda Podgórska, the secretary to Władysław Gomułka. Mrs. Podgórska, who spent six years in prison, including two in an isolation cell, served as my consultant on the film. (...) We had to make sure that we documented the film very well because we had to defend everything we did in front of a review board. That is why the French reaction at the Cannes festival showing, that the film was unreal, made me angry. It was remarkably factual.

— Krystyna Janda

In 2023, British production company Second Run, which "specialises in releasing lost gems of world cinema", rereleased the film with new and improved English subtitles and 2K restoration by Poland’s WFDiF film studio. It also featured an in-depth interview with the director in which he "discusses the film’s contextual history, its production, the controversy surrounding its release and its eventual withdrawal and banning by Polish authorities".

== Cast ==
- Krystyna Janda as Antonina 'Tonia' Dziwisz
- Adam Ferency as Lieutenant Tadeusz Morawski
- Janusz Gajos as Major Zawada "Kapielowy"
- Agnieszka Holland as Communist Witkowska
- Anna Romantowska as Miroslawa "Mira" Szejnert
- Bożena Dykiel as Honorata
- Olgierd Łukaszewicz as Konstanty Dziwisz (Tonia's husband)

== Awards ==
Festival	Category	Winner/Nominee	Result
Cannes Film Festival	Best Actress	Krystyna Janda	Won
Cannes Film Festival	Palme d'Or	Ryszard Bugajski	Nominated
Chicago International Film Festival	Silver Hugo	Ryszard Bugajski	Won
European Film Awards	Best Actress	Krystyna Janda	Nominated
European Film Awards	Best Film	Janusz Morgenstern	Nominated
European Film Awards	Best Screenwriter	Ryszard Bugajski, Janusz Dymek	Nominated
Polish Film Festival	Best Actor	Janusz Gajos	Won
Polish Film Festival	Best Actress	Krystyna Janda	Won
Polish Film Festival	Best Supporting Actress	Anna Romantowska	Won
Polish Film Festival	Special Jury Prize	Ryszard Bugajski	Won

== See also ==
- Cinema of Poland
- Stalinism in Poland
- Anti-Soviet agitation
