= Autumn in Warsaw =

2003 Japanese drama film

- DVD cover
- Screenplay by: Masatake Tamukai
- Directed by: Hiroki Hayashi
- Starring: Yuko Takeuchi; Keiko Kishi; Ayumi Ishida; Anna Romantowska
- Music by: Toshiyuki Honda
- Country of origin: Japan
- Original language: Japanese

Production
- Producer: Takahiro Kasagi
- Running time: 95 minutes
- Production company: Kansai Telecasting Corporation

Original release
- Release: 23 December 2003

Autumn in Warsaw (Japanese: ワルシャワの秋, Warushawa no aki) is a Japanese-language drama television film written by Masatake Tamukai, directed by Hiroki Hayashi, and produced by Takahiro Kasagi. It was produced and filmed in Japan by the Kansai Telecasting Corporation, and premiered on 23 December 2003. The film was based on actual events of 1922, when the Polish Committee of Rescue of Children from the Far East, with the cooperation of the government of Japan and the Japanese Red Cross Society transported around 3,000 Polish orphaned children from Russian Siberia to Osaka, Japan, before they prior to them being able to be transported to Poland. The film revolves around Yoko Aoki, a nurse in the hospital, where she takes care of a 10-years-old Lew Kamiński, who due to trauma, does not speak. The cast includes Yuko Takeuchi, Keiko Kishi, Ayumi Ishida, and Anna Romantowska.

== Plot ==
In 1922, the Polish Committee of the Rescue of Children from the Far East in agreement with the government of Japan, organises the relocation of around 3,000 Polish children from Russian Siberia to Osaka, Japan, prior to them being able to be transported to Poland. They are the orphans of Polish exiles to Siberia who lost their parents during the period of the October Revolution and the Russian Civil War. The chairperson of the committee, Anna Bielkiewicz (Anna Romantowska), travels to Japan to meet about this matter with the chairperson of the Japanese Red Cross Society. A young journalist, Takanori Honda (Kenji Sakaguchi), arrives to Vladivostok in Russia to report about the rescue and relocation operation. His fiancée Yoko Aoki (Yuko Takeuchi) works in a hospital in Osaka, which is planned to receive the children. As Takori still does not return after a few months, Yoko begins to worry about him. The children arrive to the hospital, being in poor physical and mental health. One of the children is a 10-years-old boy (portrayed by Ignacy Zalewski), who, being traumatised after the death of his mother, does not speak. Due to inability to commentate with him, one of the girls among the orphans, Karolina, calls him Kamil. Around the same time, Yoko is informed of the death of Takanori who was shot and died from his wounds. Devastated and feeling alone, Yoko devotes more time to Kamil, who is gradually recovering, and begins to speak again and becoming more cheerful. She also learns that his real name is actually Lew Kaczyński. Eventually, on the day the children are meant to be relocated to Poland, Lew hides away, scared of leaving. Yoko wants to adopt him, however she is informed it is not allowed, and he must return to Poland.

In 1951, Yoko unexpectedly meets again Karolina, and lives in the United States working as a nurse. She has with herself their son named after his father. Yoko is informed that Karolina and Lew got married, and that he died in 1944 in the Warsaw Uprising during the Second World War. She has with herself their son, who is also named Lew after his father. In 1973, Lew, who works as a musical conductor, invited Yoko to one of his concerts. She dies two years later.

== Cast ==
- Yuko Takeuchi as Yoko Aoki
  - Keiko Kishi as older Yoko
- Kenji Sakaguchi as Takanori Honda
- Mirai Yamamoto as Noriko
- Mitsuru Fukikoshi as doctor Kakinuma
- Takehiro Hira as Nobuyuki Oramura
- Ayumi Ishida as Ritsu Shizuya
- Anna Romantowska as Anna Bielkiewicz
- Keiju Kobayashi as Hirashima
- Ignacy Zalewski as Lew Kaczyński (aka Kamil) and Lew Kaczyński (younger)
- Agnieszka Pikała as Karolina
- Daniel Skowroński as Zalewski
- Kanako Irie
- Keiju Kobayashi
- Yūma Kusakawa
- Katsuyuki Murai
- Miho Ninagawa
- Megumi Sato
- Hiroyuki Sumiwaka

== Production ==
The film was based on actual events of 1922, when the Polish Committee of Rescue of Children from the Far East, with the cooperation of the government of Japan and the Japanese Red Cross Society transported around 3,000 Polish orphaned children from Russian Siberia to Osaka, Japan, before they prior to them being able to be transported to Poland. The film was written by Masatake Tamukai, directed by Hiroki Hayashi, and produced by Takahiro Kasagi. The music was done by Toshiyuki Honda. The cast includes Yuko Takeuchi, Keiko Kishi, Ayumi Ishida, and Anna Romantowska. The film was produced and filmed in Japan by the Kansai Telecasting Corporation, and premiered on 23 December 2003. The movie was made for the celebration of the 45th anniversary of the Kansai Telecasting Corporation.
