= Polish Film Festival =

Polish annual film festival

- Golden Lions (Polish: Złote Lwy)
- Location: Gdynia, Poland
- Founded: 1974
- Most recent: 2025
- Awards: Golden Lions; Silver Lions; Platinum Lions; Sapphire Lions
- Hosted by: Ministry of Culture and National Heritage of Poland; Polish Film Institute (PISF); Polish Filmmakers Association; Pomeranian Voivodeship
- Artistic director: Joanna Łapińska
- Festival date: Opening: 21 September 2026; Closing: 26 September 2026
- Website: festiwalgdynia.pl

Current: 51st
- 52nd 50th

The Polish Film Festival (Polish: Festiwal Polskich Filmów Fabularnych, FPFF), formerly Gdynia Film Festival (2012), Gdynia – Festiwal Filmowy (2013) and Film Festival w Gdynia (2014–2016), is an annual film festival first held in Gdańsk (1974–1986), now held in Gdynia, Poland. It has taken place every year since 1974, except in 1982 and 1983 when Poland was under martial law.

The organizers of the festival are the Ministry of Culture and National Heritage of Poland, Polish Film Institute (PISF), Polish Filmmakers Association, the Pomeranian Voivodeship Local Government as well as the port city of Gdynia.

The jury for the 2008 competition was headed by Robert Gliński, a director who had previously won at the festival.

== Awards ==
The Polish Film Festival main award is the Grand Prix Golden Lions (Polish: Złote Lwy), which is different from the Eagle (Polish: Orzeł), awarded at the Polish Film Awards and the Seattle Polish Film Festival (Seattle is the sister city of Gdynia). Special awards include the Platinum Lions (Platynowe Lwy) conferred for lifetime achievements in cinema as well as the Audience Award.

- Golden Lions: The award's name comes from the coat of arms of Gdańsk, where the festival was held until 1986. It is the main film award in the Main Competition, which goes to the director and producer of the best film, along with a financial prize of zł300,000 (zł200,000 for the director, zł100,000 for the producer).
- Silver Lions: It is also presented to the director and producer along with a financial prize of zł150,000 (zł100,000 for the director, zł50,000 for the producer).
- Platinum Lions: This award honors a filmmaker for their entire body of work. The winner is nominated by the Program Council in consultation with the Polish Filmmakers Association, and the award is presented by the Organizing Committee. The winner receives a statuette and a cash prize of zł30,000.
- Sapphire Lions: This award was instituted from 49th edition in 2024. It is awarded to the director and producer of the best film in the Perspectives Competition, along with a financial prize of zł50,000 (zł30,000 for the director, zł20,000 for the producer).
- Audience Award: This award is given to the director of the film that receives the highest number of audience votes at the festival. The prize is zł25,000, funded by the Kino Polska Group.

Agnieszka Holland holds the record number of wins at the festival having been awarded the Grand Prix four times. In 2020, Mariusz Wilczyński's Kill It and Leave This Town became the first ever animated film in the festival's history to be awarded the Golden Lions for Best Film.

== List of winners ==
=== Golden Lions ===
The Golden Lions Award was not awarded on six occasions: in 1976, four films were instead awarded Main Prizes (Polish: Nagroda Główna), the films which received this distinction were Jerzy Łomnicki's Ocalić miasto, Marek Piwowski's Przepraszam, czy tu biją?, Andrzej Wajda's Smuga cienia and Mieczysław Waśkowski's Hazardziści; in 1982 and 1983, the festival was not held due to the imposition of the martial law in Poland; in 1989, 1991 and 1996.

Year	Director(s)	Original title	English title	Source(s)
1974	Jerzy Hoffman	Potop	The Deluge	
1975	Andrzej Wajda	Ziemia obiecana	The Promised Land	
1975	Jerzy Antczak	Dnie i noce	Nights and Days	
1976	No award	–	–	–
1977	Krzysztof Zanussi	Barwy ochronne	Camouflage	
1978	Stanisław Różewicz	Pasja	Passion	
1978	Andrzej Wajda	Bez znieczulenia	Without Anesthesia	
1979	Krzysztof Kieślowski	Amator	Camera Buff	
1980	Kazimierz Kutz	Paciorki jednego różańca	The Beads of One Rosary	
1981	Agnieszka Holland	Gorączka	Fever	
1982	Cancelled	–	–	–
1983	Cancelled	–	–	–
1984	Jerzy Kawalerowicz	Austeria	Austeria	
1985	Stanisław Różewicz	Kobieta w kapeluszu	Woman in a Hat	
1986	Witold Leszczyński	Siekierezada	Axiliad	
1987	Janusz Zaorski	Matka Królów	The Mother of Kings	
1988	Krzysztof Kieślowski	Krótki film o miłości	A Short Film About Love	
1988	Krzysztof Kieślowski	Krótki film o zabijaniu	A Short Film About Killing	
1989	No award	–	–	–
1990	Wojciech Marczewski	Ucieczka z kina "Wolność"	Escape from the 'Liberty' Cinema	
1991	No award	–	–	–
1992	Robert Gliński	Wszystko co najważniejsze	All That Really Matters	
1993	Radosław Piwowarski	Kolejność uczuć	The Order of Feelings	
1993	Grzegorz Królikiewicz	Przypadek Pekosińskiego	The Pekosiński's Case	
1994	Kazimierz Kutz	Zawrócony	Reverted	
1995	Juliusz Machulski	Girl Guide	Girl Guide	
1996	No award	–	–	–
1997	Jerzy Stuhr	Historie miłosne	Love Stories	
1998	Jan Jakub Kolski	Historia kina w Popielawach	The History of the Cinema in Popielawy	
1999	Krzysztof Krauze	Dług	The Debt	
2000	Krzysztof Zanussi	Życie jako śmiertelna choroba przenoszona droga płciową	Life as a Fatal Sexually Transmitted Disease	
2001	Robert Gliński	Cześć, Tereska	Hi, Tereska	
2002	Marek Koterski	Dzień świra	Day of the Wacko	
2003	Dariusz Gajewski	Warszawa	Warsaw	
2004	Magdalena Piekorz	Pręgi	The Welts	
2005	Feliks Falk	Komornik	The Collector	
2006	Joanna Kos-Krauze and Krzysztof Krauze	Plac Zbawiciela	Saviour Square	
2007	Andrzej Jakimowski	Sztuczki	Tricks	
2008	Waldemar Krzystek	Mała Moskwa	Little Moscow	
2009	Borys Lankosz	Rewers	Reverse	
2010	Jan Kidawa-Błoński	Różyczka	Little Rose	
2011	Jerzy Skolimowski	Essential Killing	Essential Killing	
2012	Agnieszka Holland	W ciemności	In Darkness	
2013	Paweł Pawlikowski	Ida	Ida	
2014	Łukasz Palkowski	Bogowie	Gods	
2015	Małgorzata Szumowska	Body/Ciało	Body	
2016	Jan P. Matuszyński	Ostatnia rodzina	The Last Family	
2017	Piotr Domalewski	Cicha noc	The Silent Night	
2018	Paweł Pawlikowski	Zimna wojna	Cold War	
2019	Agnieszka Holland	Obywatel Jones	Mr. Jones	
2020	Mariusz Wilczyński	Zabij to i wyjedź z tego miasta	Kill It and Leave This Town	
2021	Łukasz Ronduda and Łukasz Gutt	Wszystkie nasze strachy	All Our Fears	
2022	Agnieszka Smoczyńska	The Silent Twins	The Silent Twins	
2023	Paweł Maślona	Kos	Scarborn	
2024	Agnieszka Holland	Zielona granica	Green Border	
2025	Piotr Domalewski	Ministranci	The Altar Boys	
2026	Maciej Sobieszczański	Przez ścianę	Through the Wall	

=== Platinum Lions ===
- 2007 – Jerzy Kawalerowicz
- 2008 – Stanisław Różewicz
- 2009 – Kazimierz Kutz, Jerzy Hoffman
- 2010 – Janusz Morgenstern
- 2011 – Tadeusz Konwicki, Roman Polanski
- 2012 – Jerzy Wójcik, Witold Sobociński
- 2013 – Jerzy Antczak
- 2014 – Sylwester Chęciński
- 2015 – Tadeusz Chmielewski
- 2016 – Janusz Majewski
- 2017 – Jerzy Gruza
- 2018 – Jerzy Skolimowski
- 2019 – Krzysztof Zanussi
- 2020 – Andrzej Barański, Feliks Falk
- 2021 – Agnieszka Holland
- 2022 – Filip Bajon
- 2023 – Allan Starski
- 2024 – Wojciech Marczewski
- 2025 – Ewa Braun
- 2026 – Halina Prugar-Ketling

== Gallery ==
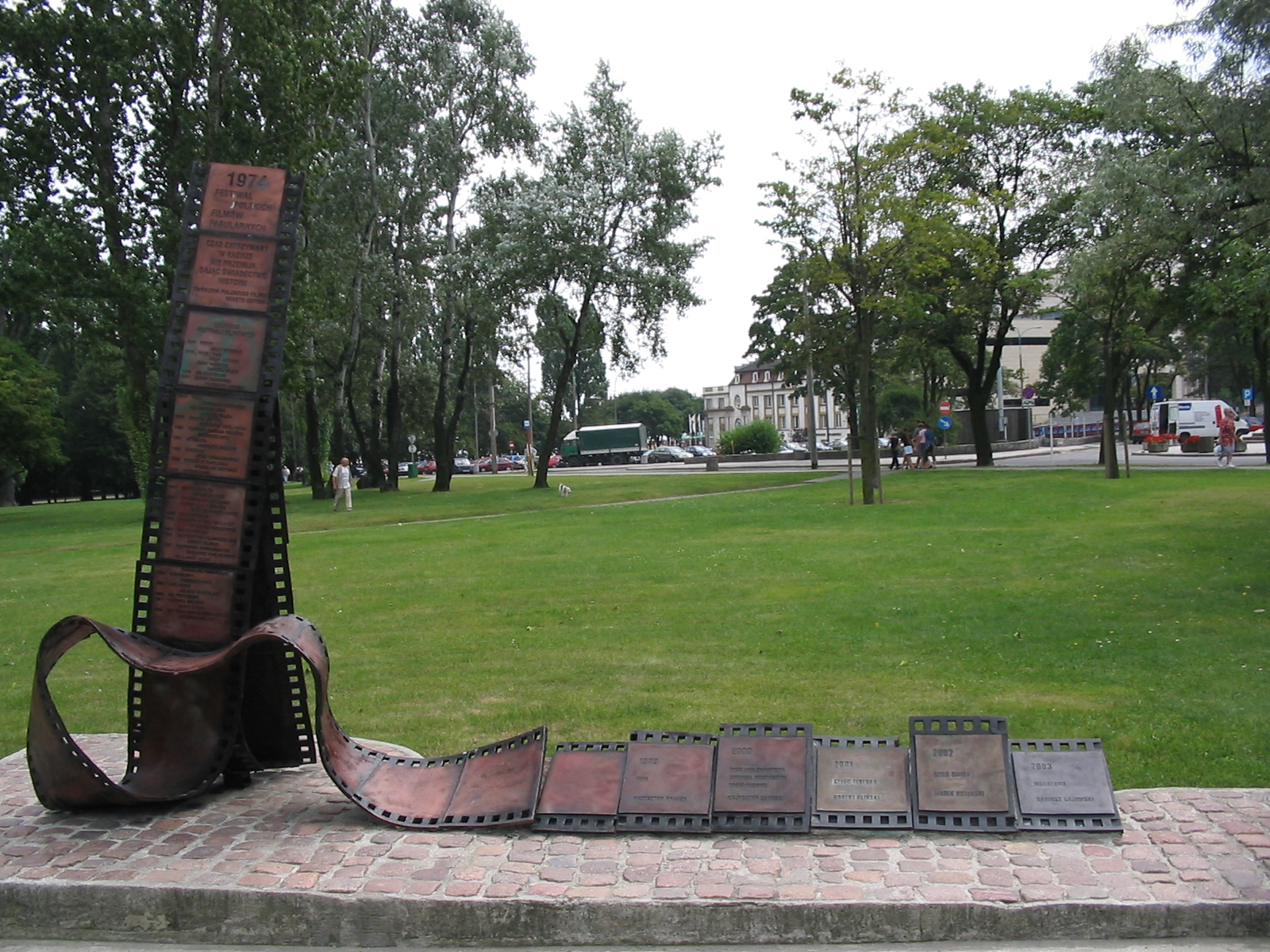
Commemorative festival statue in Gdynia

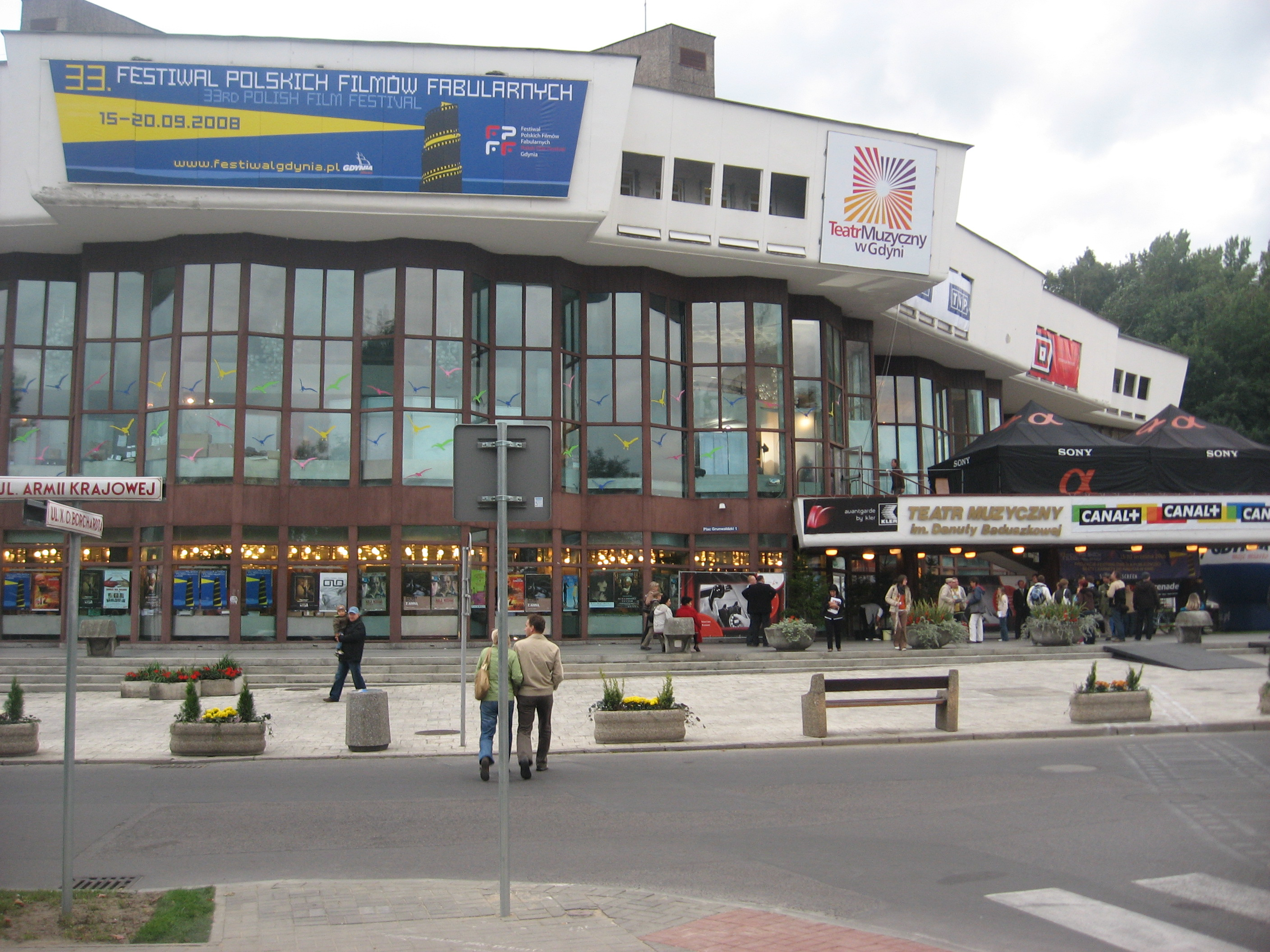
Music Theatre in Gdynia, the main venue of the festival

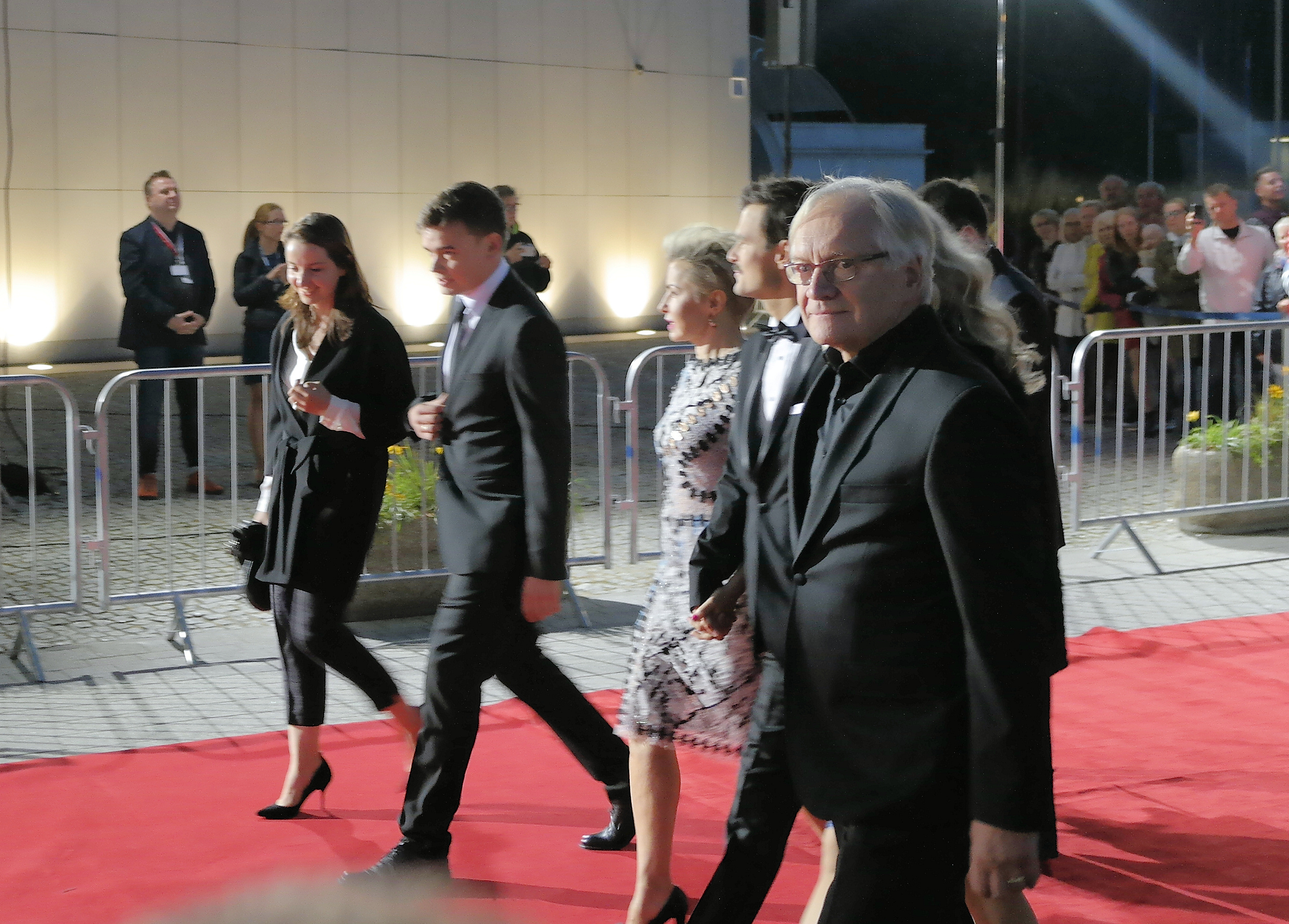
Andrzej Seweryn at the 2016 Gdynia Film Festival

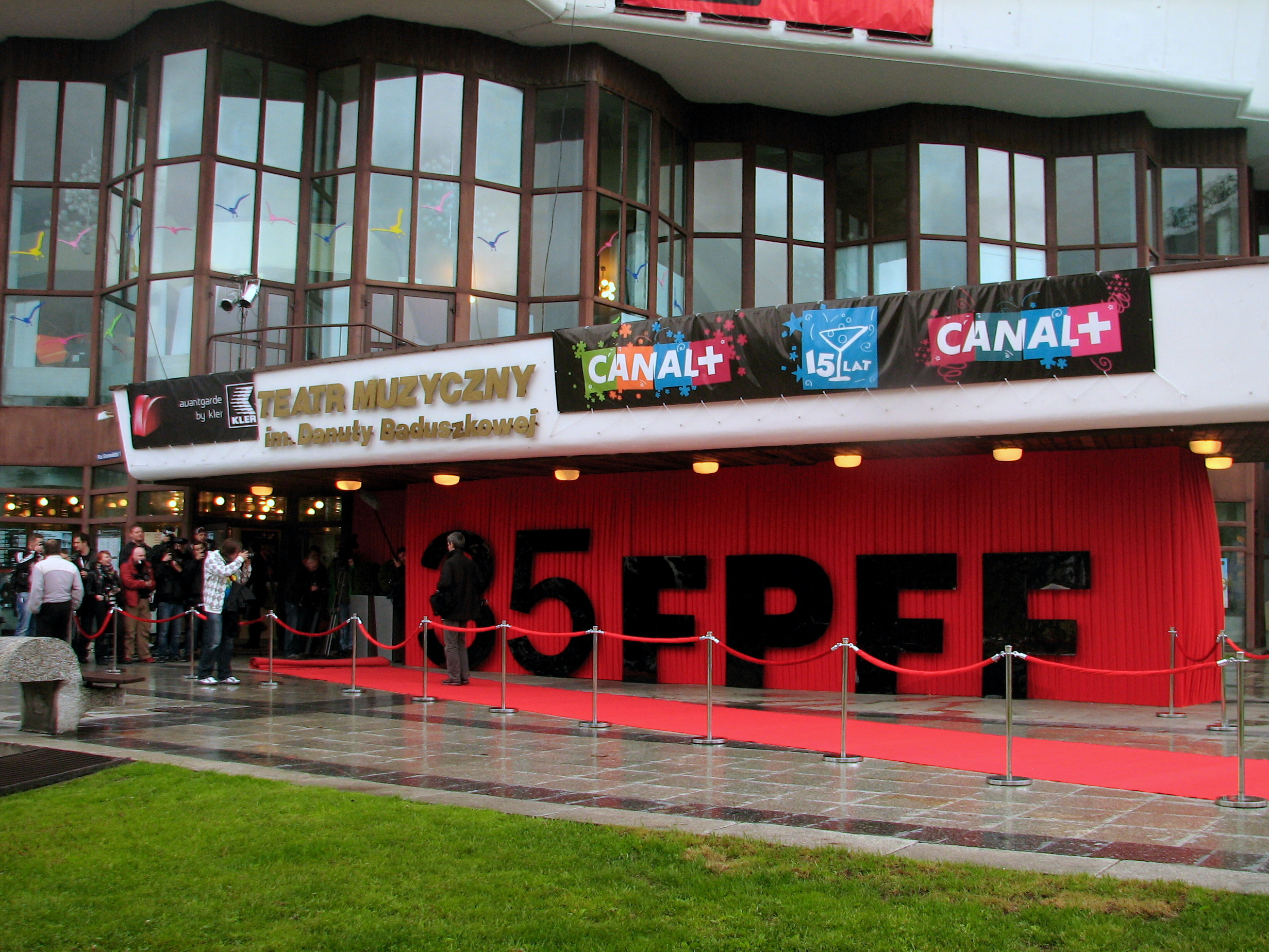
Main entrance

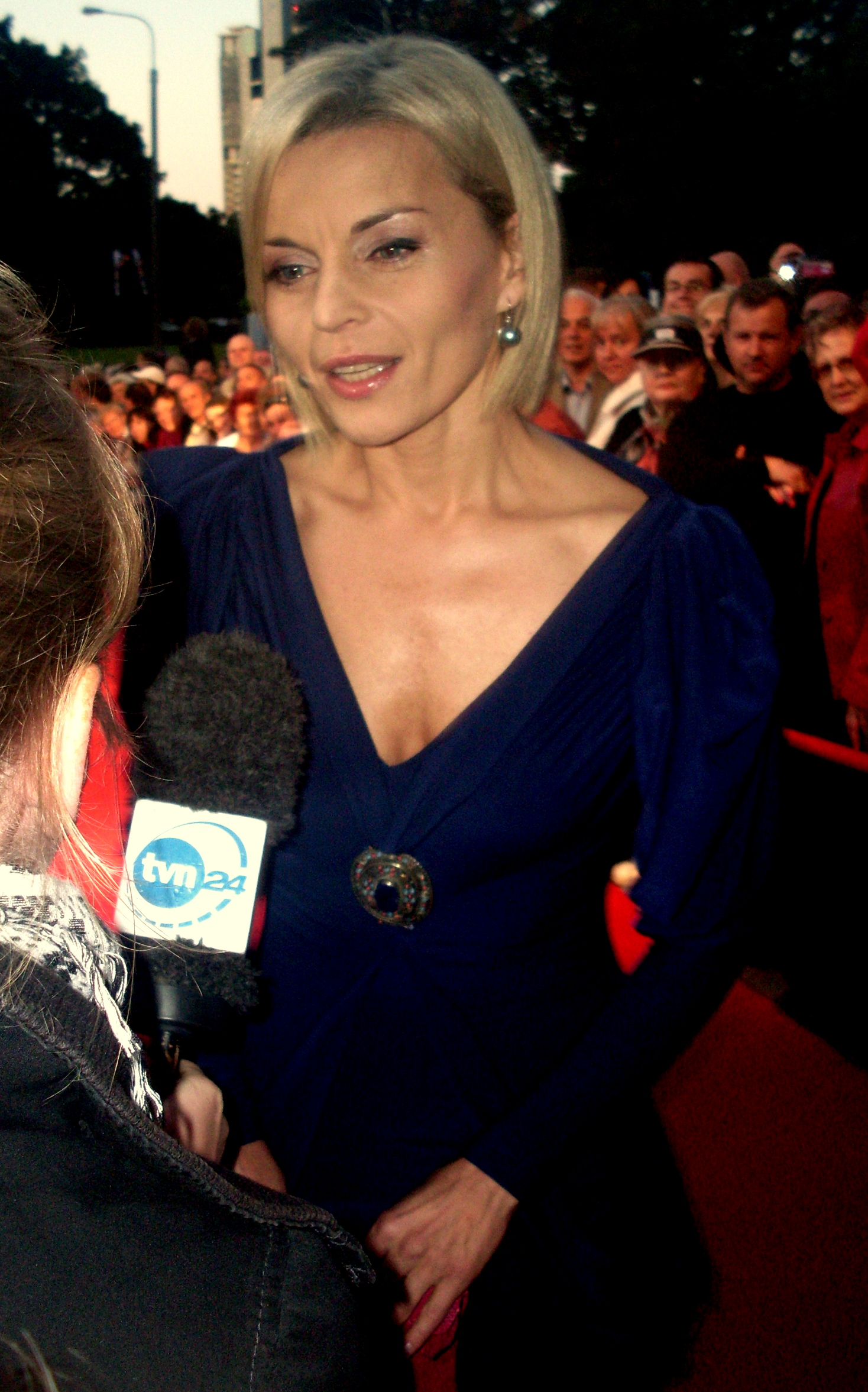
Małgorzata Foremniak at the 2009 Polish Film Festival

== See also ==
- Polish cinema
- List of film festivals
