= Czas zdrady =

1997 film by Wojciech Marczewski

Czas zdrady (English: Time of Betrayal) is a Polish historical film directed by Wojciech Marczewski. It was released in 1997.

== Cast ==
- Janusz Gajos as Machiavelli Niccolo
- Jerzy Radziwiłowicz as Savonarola Girolamo
- Krzysztof Wakuliński as envoy
- Marek Siudym as soldier
- Jan Marciniak as doorman
- Agnieszka Krukówna as Rosana
- Mariusz Benoit as Alberti
- Leon Charewicz as Matteo
- Rafał Mohr as Tonino
- Jakub Penier as Carlitto
- Andrzej Żółkiewski as soldier
- Henryk Gołębiewski as soldier
- Jarosław Nowikowski as rider
- Adam Hejger as rider
