= The Closed Circuit =

2013 Polish film

- Film poster
- Polish: Układ zamknięty
- Directed by: Ryszard Bugajski
- Starring: Janusz Gajos; Kazimierz Kaczor
- Cinematography: Piotr Sobociński Jr.
- Release date: 5 April 2013
- Running time: 120 minutes
- Country: Poland
- Language: Polish

The Closed Circuit (Polish: Układ zamknięty) is a 2013 Polish action film directed by Ryszard Bugajski.

== History ==
The writers of The Closed Circuit, Michał Pruski and Mirosław Piepka, were inspired by the true story of businessmen struggling with the accusations made by the prosecutor's office and the tax office. Some of them ended up in mining arrest, and their company was brought to collapse. One of the cases against them was discontinued years later due to the lack of any signs of a crime, and entrepreneurs received 10,000 zlotys in compensation, while in the second, the court issued an invalid conviction at the end of 2013. Some of the accused were acquitted, and some pleaded guilty and voluntarily submitted to the punishment.

== Plot ==
Based on real events, the story of three owners of a thriving company, who – as a result of the collusion of corrupt officials: the prosecutor (Janusz Gajos) and the head of the tax office (Kazimierz Kaczor) – are showly detained on charges of acting in an organized criminal group and money laundering.

== Cast ==
- Janusz Gajos as Andrzej Kostrzewa
- Kazimierz Kaczor as Miroslaw Kaminski
- Wojciech Zoladkowicz as Kamil Slodowski
- Robert Olech as Piotr Maj
- Przemysław Sadowski as Marek Stawski
- Magdalena Kumorek as Dorota Maj
