= Krzysztof Kolberger =

Polish actor and theatre director (1950–2011)

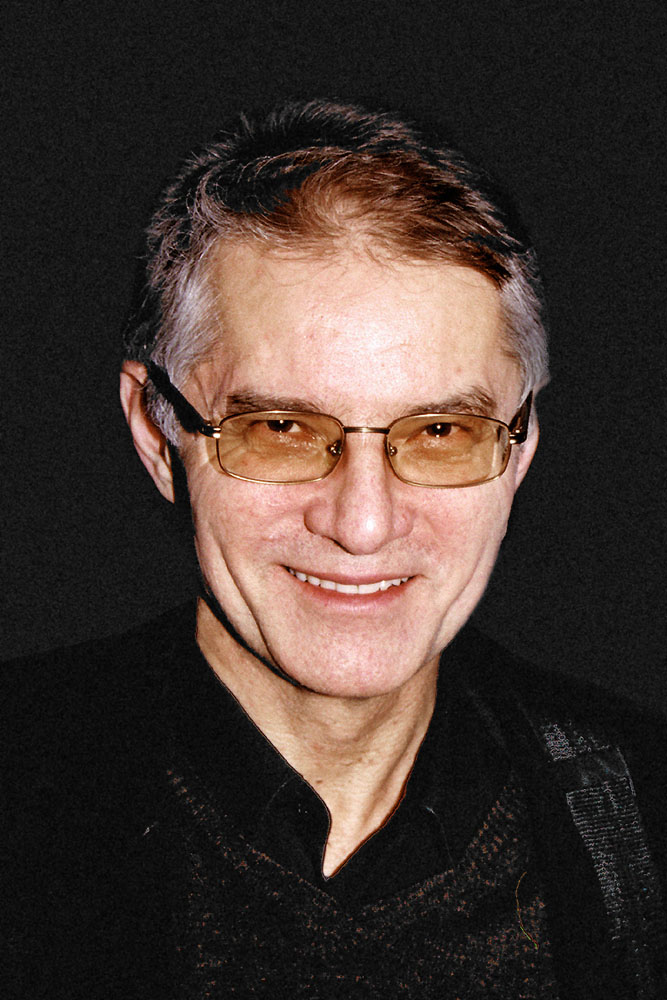
- Krzysztof Kolberger in 2005
- Born: 13 August 1950; Gdańsk, Poland
- Died: 7 January 2011 (aged 60); Warsaw, Poland
- Occupations: Actor, theatre director
- Years active: 1974–2011

Krzysztof Marek Kolberger (13 August 1950 – 7 January 2011) a Polish actor and theatre director. His father's surname was changed from Kohlberger in the 1950s. He had daughter, actress Julia Kolberger, with Anna Romantowska.

== Life and career ==
Krzysztof Kolberger studied at Warsaw Academy of Dramatic Arts (PWST) and graduated in 1972. He débuted at the Theatre of Silesia. After a period, he was involved in the Upper Silesian National Theatre in Warsaw (Teatr Narodowy w Warszawie), where he starred in such plays as Dziady (Forefathers' Eve), Wacława dzieje (The History of Wenceslas) and Wesele (The Wedding).

He directed a version of Krakowiacy i górale at the Wrocław Opera House, (which then became known as the Teatr Wielki w Poznaniu or 'Grand Theatre in Poznan'), Nędza uszczęśliwiona (The Happy Misery) (also at the Grand Theatre in Poznan), "Żołnierz królowej Madagaskaru (Soldier's Queen of Madagascar) (at the Szczecin Opera) and Królewna Śnieżka i siedmiu krasnoludków (Snow White and the Seven Dwarfs).

On 7 April 2005, the eve of the Funeral of John Paul II, Kolberger read the Pope's testament on TVN Television. He was also the narrator and soloist alongside Krystyna Tkacz, Beata Rybotycka and Krzysztof Gosztyła in Msza Polskiej (Polish Mass).

He was one of the heroes of the book Odnaleźć dobro (Finding the Good) (by author Marzanna Graff-Oszczepalińska) in which he told in the form of a memoir about his personal encounter with the true good which is present in man.

== Latter years and death ==
Krzysztof Kolberger had for many years suffered from renal cell carcinoma. He was an honorary president of the Stowarzyszenie Chorych na Raka Nerki (Kidney Cancer Association). He underwent surgery twice, which he said in a significant way had changed his approach to life and his career, including the way he acted on stage and the way he directed. This was stated in a book-interview published in 2007 entitled Przypadek nie-przypadek. Rozmowa między wierszami księdza Jana Twardowskiego (Fri: "The case of non-coincidence. Conversation between the lines of Father Jan Twardowski").

He ultimately died from heart failure.

== Filmography ==
- Romeo and Juliet
- W biały dzień (1980)
- Epitafium dla Barbary Radziwiłłówny (Epitaph for Barbara Radziwiłłówna, 1983)
- Kornblumenblau (1989)
- Najdłuższa wojna nowoczesnej Europy (The Longest War of Modern Europe).

== Awards ==
- 2007 – Order of Polonia Restituta
- 2008 – Gold Medal for Merit to Culture – Gloria Artis

== See also ==
- Polish cinema
- Polish Film Awards
