= Anna Romantowska =

Polish actress (born 1950)

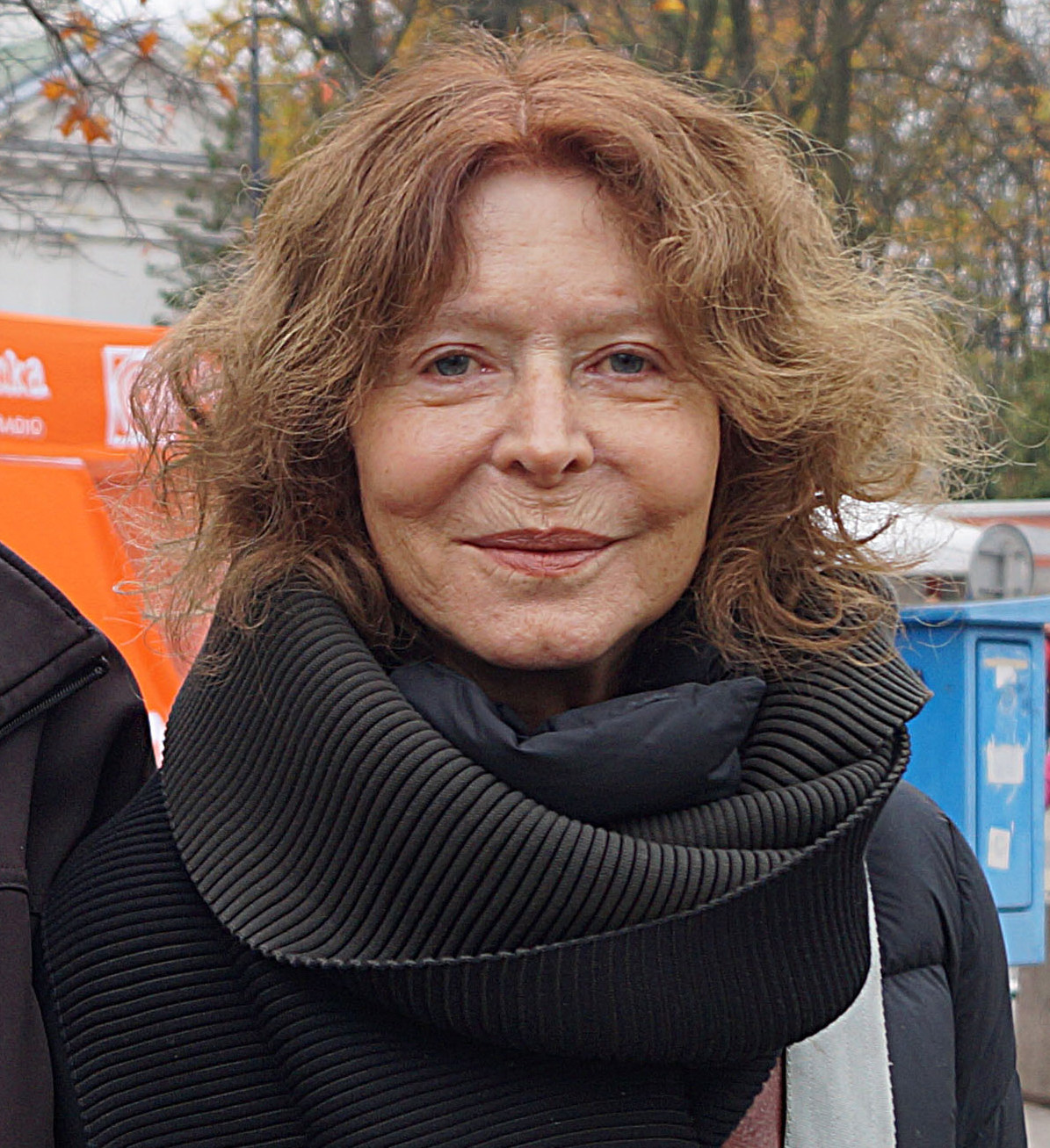
- Romantowska in 2017
- Born: 16 May 1950 (age 76); Poland
- Occupation: Actress
- Years active: 1979–present
- Spouse: Krzysztof Kolberger

Anna Romantowska (born 16 May 1950) is a Polish film and theatre actress.

== Biography ==
She is married to the Polish actor and director Krzysztof Kolberger with whom she has a daughter, the Polish actress Julia Kolberger.

In 1974 she graduated from the Academy of Dramatic Arts in Warsaw (then known as the Państwowa Wyższa Szkoła Teatralna, PWST or in English, the State Drama School).

She appeared in the Silesian Wyspiański Theatre in Katowice (1974–1975) and Warsaw’s National Theatre (1975–1984) and Teatr Studio (1984–1993).

Romantowska is also known in Poland as "the unforgettable voice" of Anne Shirley in a TV series adaptation of Anne of Green Gables. Since 1977 she has appeared in Polish television films and theatrical productions.

Her first film role was in a Polish film entitled Trzy po trzy (Three By Three). She also played the part of an accountant named Maria in a film called Statyści (The Extras).

In 1997 during the "II Festiwal Gwiazd" (Second Festival of Stars) in Międzyzdroje she left a hand mark in a slab of concrete at the "Promenada Gwiazd" (Promenade of Stars). She has also won awards at the Polish Film Festival for Best Supporting Actress in the film Interrogation in 1990 and again in 2006 for her role in Statyści (The Extras).
