= Teresa Marczewska =

Polish actress

Teresa Marczewska (born January 6, 1948, in Jarosław) is a Polish actress and the wife of the Polish film director Wojciech Marczewski.

== Selected filmography ==
- Scratch (2008)
- Who Never Lived (2006)
- Quo vadis (2001)
- Weiser (2001)
- Escape from the 'Liberty' Cinema (1990)
- Dekalog (1988)
- Dreszcze (Shivers) (1981)
- Nightmares (1979)
- Stawka większa niż życie (1968)
- The Sun Rises Once a Day (1967)
