= Julia Kolberger =

Polish director and actress (born 1978)

Julia Kolberger (born in Warsaw in 1978) is a Polish director and actress.

In 2009 she graduated from the Faculty of Directing at National Film School in Łódź).

She is the daughter of Polish actors Krzysztof Kolberger and Anna Romantowska.
