= Ryszard Bugajski =

Polish film director and screenwriter (1943–2019)

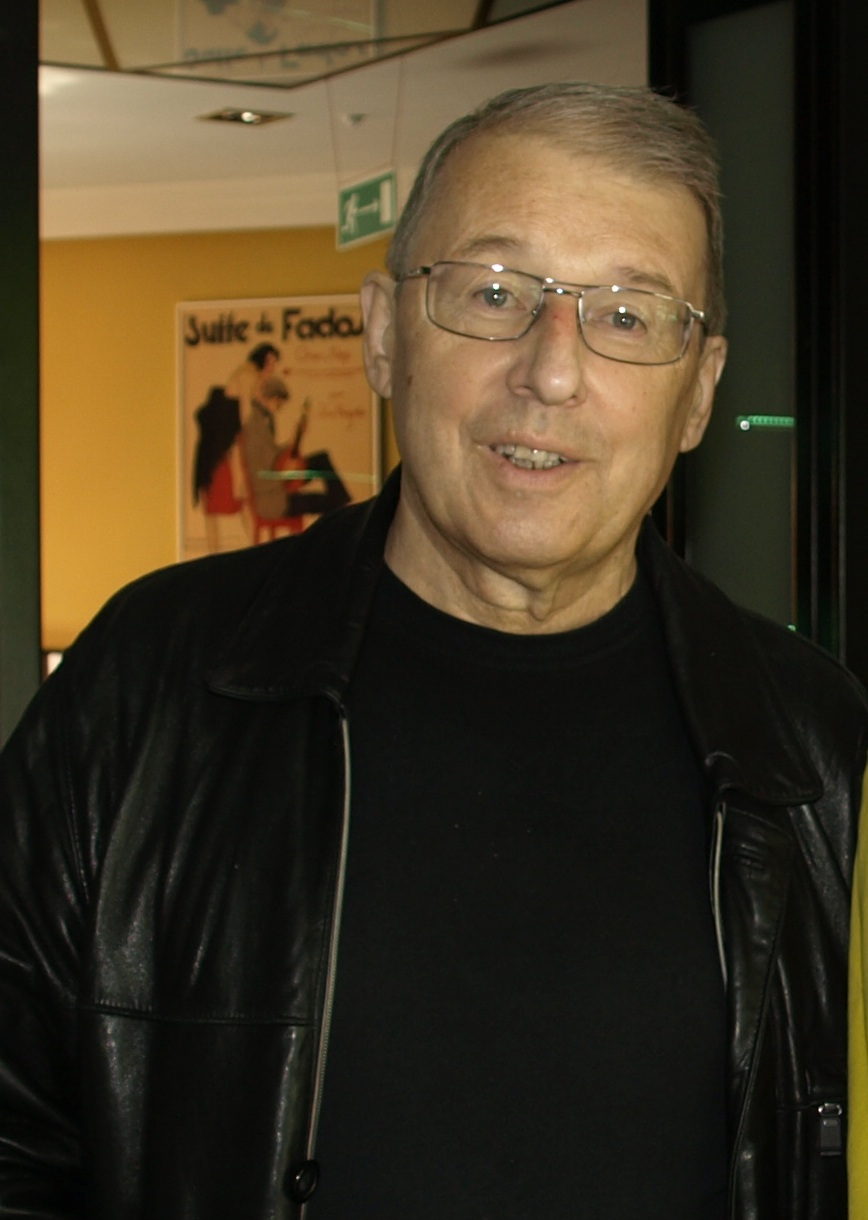
- Born: 27 April 1943; Warsaw, Poland
- Died: 7 June 2019 (aged 76); Warsaw, Poland
- Education: National Film School in Łódź
- Occupations: Film director, screenwriter
- Years active: 1972–2019
- Spouse: Maria Mamona

Ryszard Bugajski (27 April 1943 – 7 June 2019) was a Polish film director and screenwriter. He directed 23 films and television shows since 1972. His 1982 film Interrogation starring Krystyna Janda and Adam Ferency, described as "the most anti-Communist film in the history of Polish People's Republic" was entered into the 1990 Cannes Film Festival after being suppressed by the Polish communist authorities for several years.

== Life and career ==
He was born on 27 April 1943 in German-occupied Poland. His family was slated to be killed by firing squad, but a bomb fell before the wall they were lined up to be shot that saw the squad killed instead. His father was Edward Bugajski, a member of the pre-war Polish Socialist Party (PPS). He had told his family to hide in a safe place, which led to them staying in suburban Warsaw in a place called Choszczowka. Bugajski had numerous interests as a youth, initially aspiring to become a musician, but he later thought he would become a painter. However, he did not know exactly what he wanted to be by the time he graduated high school. He studied philosophy at the University of Warsaw for three years, but an accidental viewing of 8½ spurred him into wanting to become a filmmaker. He was accepted into studying directing at the National Film School in Łódź, which he graduated from in 1973.

In 1976, he joined the X Film Unit managed by Andrzej Wajda, where he directed the films A Woman and a Woman and Classes. In 1981, he made the full-length feature film Interrogation, which was banned by the communist censorship because of the film's message being incompatible with the political line of the Polish authorities after the imposition of martial law. As a result of this, the X Unit was officially dissolved. In 1985, Bugajski decided to emigrate to Canada where he became a director of popular television series. The official premiere of Interrogation took place in December 1989, after the collapse of communism in Poland. He had kept the film alive in the underground movement by making copies of the film and giving them out for showings in church basements.

He was a recipient of numerous film awards including the Golden Grape Award, Special Award at the Gdynia Film Festival and Silver Hugo Award at the Chicago International Film Festival.

In June 2008, he was awarded the Officer's Cross of the Order of Polonia Restituta for "his outstanding contributions to the democratic transformations in Poland as well as for achievements for the country in his professional and social work".

In October 2008, he received the Golden Medal for Merit to Culture - Gloria Artis from the-then Minister of Culture and National Heritage Bogdan Zdrojewski.

He died on 7 June 2019 in Warsaw after a long illness.

== Selected filmography ==
- Kobieta i kobieta (1979)
- Interrogation (made in 1981 but not released until 1989)
- Clearcut (1990)
- Gracze (1995)
- The Death of Captain Pilecki (2006)
- Generał Nil (2009)
- Układ zamknięty (2013)
- Blindness (2016)

== See also ==
- Cinema of Poland
- List of Poles
