= Polish Film Institute =

State legal entity

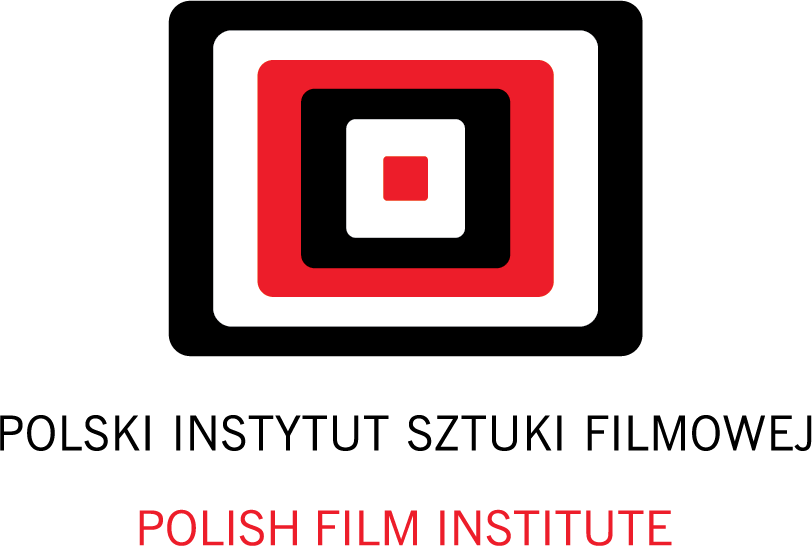
- Type: State
- Industry: Entertainment
- Founded: 2005; 21 years ago
- Headquarters: Warsaw, Poland
- Area served: Poland
- Key people: Kamila Dorbach (director)
- Products: Motion pictures
- Website: www.pisf.pl

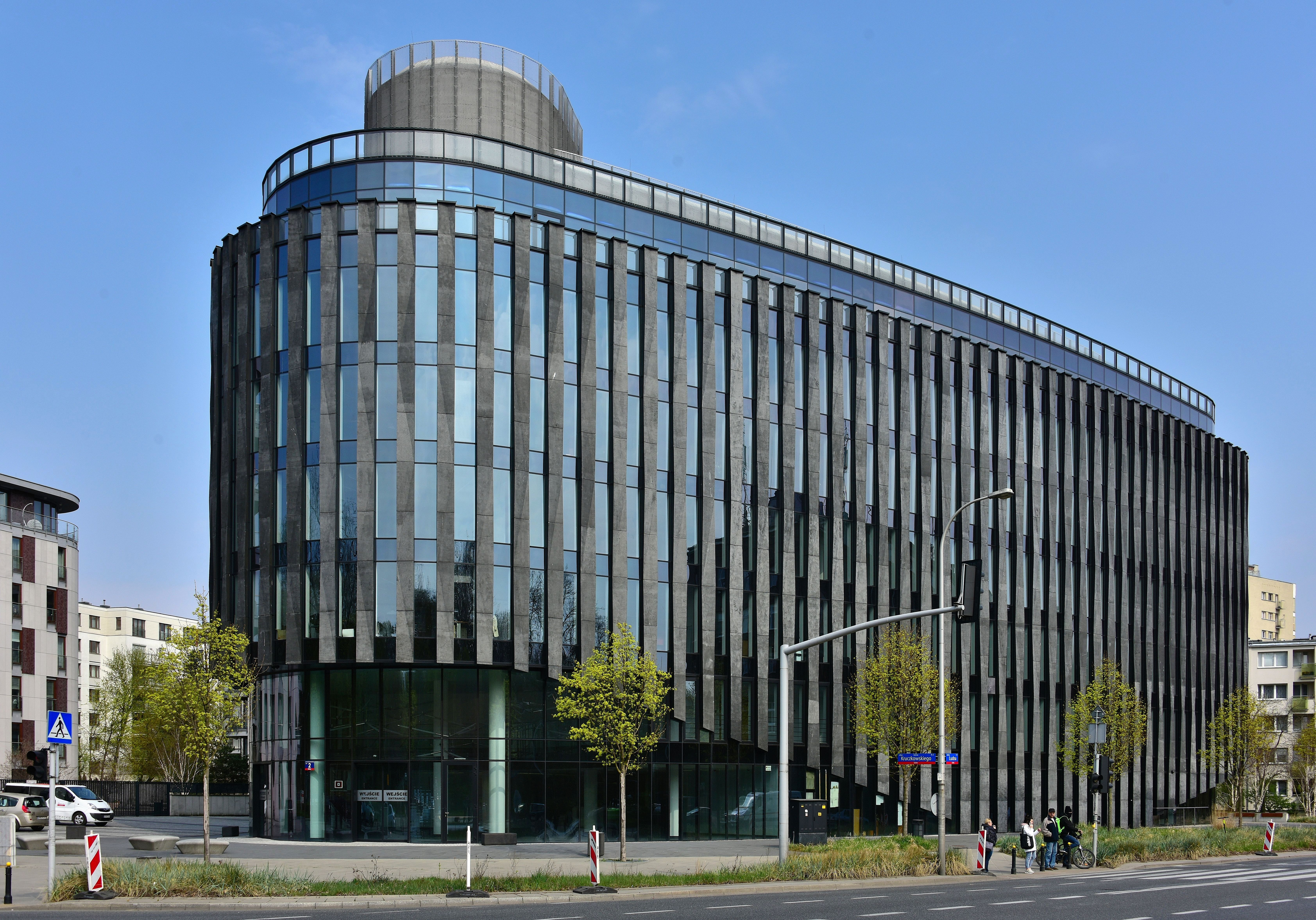
Powiśle Park office building in Warsaw, the seat of the Polish Film Institute.

Polish Film Institute (Polish: Polski Instytut Sztuki Filmowej) is a state legal entity established in 2005 to support the development of cinematography. The Institute operates on the basis of the Act of 30 June 2005 on cinematography, the Act of 9 November 2018 on financial support for audiovisual production and its statute.

The activities of the Polish Film Institute are financed primarily from payments by television broadcasters, digital platforms, cable television, as well as cinema owners and film distributors.

In 2019, thanks to the funding of the Polish Film Institute, 40 feature films, 42 documentaries, and 22 animated films were produced. The Institute also supports, among others, all the most important film festivals taking place in Poland, film education, cinema development, and international promotion of Polish cinematography.

== Tasks of the Polish Film Institute ==
PFI carries out the tasks of state policy in the field of cinematography, in particular by creating conditions for the development of Polish film production and film co-production. It inspires and supports the development of all film genres, especially artistic films, including film development, production, and distribution. The Institute also supports activities aimed at creating conditions for universal access to the achievements of Polish, European and world film art. It also supports film debuts and the artistic development of young filmmakers.

Polish Film Institute co-finances projects in the field of film development, production, distribution and dissemination, promotion of Polish cinematography, and dissemination of film culture, including the production of films undertaken by the Polish community. The Institute provides expert services to public administration bodies, and also supports the maintenance of film archives. It works to develop the potential of the Polish independent cinema industry, in particular small and medium-sized enterprises operating in the cinematography. It gives each film screened in the cinema an individual identifier published on the Institute's website in the Public Information Bulletin.

== The organization and structure of the Polish Film Institute ==
The governing bodies of the Institute are the Director of the Institute and the Institute's Council.

The Director of the Polish Film Institute is responsible for the overall activities of the Institute. Using the opinions of experts assessing the applications, he makes decisions on co-financing film projects by the Polish Film Institute. The term of office of the Director of the Institute is 5 years. Since December 8, 2017, Radosław Śmigulski has been the director of the Polish Film Institute.

Directors of the Polish Film Institute:

- Agnieszka Odorowicz 3/10/2005 – 2/10/2015
- Magdalena Sroka 3/10/2015 - 9/10/2017
- Izabela Kiszka-Hoflik (p.o.) October 16, 2017 - December 7, 2017
- Radosław Śmigulski from 08/12/2017

The PFI Council consists of 11 members, it is made up of representatives of filmmakers, film producers, trade unions operating in cinematography, cinemas, distributors, broadcasters, cable TV operators and digital platforms. Members of the Institute Council are appointed by the Minister of Culture and National Heritage for a three-year term. The PFI Council gives opinions on, among others the business plan, financial plan and annual reports of the Institute, as well as the division of funds into individual areas of cinematography.

Composition of the Institute's Council for the 2017-2020 term:

- Rafał Wieczyński - Chairman
- Joanna Szymańska - Vice-president
- Tomasz Dąbrowski - Secretary of the Supervisory Board
- Jacek Bromski
- Andrzej Bubeła
- Andrzej Jakimowski
- Mateusz Matyszkowicz
- Igor Ostrowski
- Jarosław Szoda
- Krzysztof Turkowski
- Zbigniew Żmigrodzki

The activities of the Institute are supervised by the Minister of Culture and National Heritage to the extent specified in the Act, including approval of the business plan and the draft annual financial plan, as well as the activity and financial reports.

== Revenues of the Institute ==
The budget of the Polish Film Institute consists mainly of payments made by TV broadcasters, digital platforms, cable TV, as well as cinema owners and film distributors. These entities are obliged to transfer to the Polish Film Institute contributions in the amount of 1.5% of the generated income.

The source of revenues is also a subsidy from the budget of the Minister of Culture and National Heritage.

The funds obtained by the Institute support cinematography, and are spent in the form of subsidies, guarantees, loans, scholarships and awards. The instrument for the implementation of this support are Operational Programs, announced for individual years by the Director of the Polish Film Institute.

== Operational Programs of the Polish Film Institute ==
The main task of the Polish Film Institute is to provide funding under Operational Programs for film production, education, promotion of film culture, development of cinemas and International promotion of Polish cinematography. Operational Programs are the most important instrument for fulfilling statutory tasks by the Polish Film Institute - they define the scope of public aid, eligible applicants and types of tasks. The Programs also contain other information, including specifying eligible costs, project selection criteria, a list of necessary application elements and the settlement procedure.

In 2019, the Polish Film Institute ran 6 Operational Programs: Film Production, Film Education, Promotion of Film Culture, Promotion of Polish Film Abroad, Development of Cinemas, awards, experts, and others.

In 2019, the director of the Polish Film Institute made decisions on co-financing projects under all Operational Programs for a total amount of PLN 163,918,655.

== Program of Granting Financial Support for audiovisual productions "30% Cash Rebate - Incentives" ==
Incentives for filmmakers "Cash Rebate" were introduced in Poland in February 2019 based on the Act of November 9, 2018, on financial support for audiovisual production and the regulation of the Minister of Culture and National Heritage.

It is a new tool to support film production. From February 19, 2019, it offers reimbursement of production costs incurred in Poland in the amount of up to 30% of Polish eligible expenses. It is a systemic solution whose primary task is to support audiovisual production in Poland. The funds come directly from the state budget, and the operator of the program is the Polish Film Institute. The tasks of the Institute include, mainly, the granting, payment and settlement of financial support for audiovisual production in the form of reimbursement of part of Polish eligible costs.

The Polish system of incentives is open to domestic and international productions, for feature films and series, animations, and documentaries. The reimbursement is available for Polish and international co-productions and services provided for foreign productions (so-called services). In order for the project to be supported, its producers must spend in Poland the amount of money specified in the regulations, cooperate with Polish filmmakers and film crews, and shoot in Polish locations or film studios. After meeting the required criteria, support is granted automatically, there is no expert body allocating funds. The mechanism is based on economic and legal, not artistic criteria.

== The Digital Poland Program ==
Since 2017, the Polish Film Institute has been implementing the Digital Poland Program, whose main goal is to restore, digitize and make available film materials in the form of full-length films, documentaries, fairy tales and animations, produced by Polish film studios. The project is implemented by a Consortium composed of PFI as the project leader, it manages and coordinates the activities of the project partners: Documentary and Feature Film Studio in Warsaw (from October 1, 2019, it is merged with the TOR Film Studio, KADR Film Studio, ZEBRA Film Studio, and Studio Miniatur Filmowych ) and Animated Film Studio in Bielsko-Biała.

In 2018, a total of 23 feature films and 7 animation episodes were restored and nearly a thousand episodes of the Polish Film Chronicle were digitized.

In 2019, 73 feature films, 14 documentaries, 266 episodes of animated films, 2 full-length animations were restored, and 2,403 episodes of the Polish Film Chronicle were digitized.

== PFI Awards ==
For many years, the Polish Film Institute has been involved in the organization of the Polish Film Festival in Gdynia, during which since 2008 it has been awarding the Polish Film Institute Awards to people and institutions that have distinguished themselves in the promotion of Polish cinema. The prizes are awarded in 9 categories: Cinema, Film event, Promotion of Polish film abroad, Film criticism, Film education, Book on film, Distribution of Polish film, Film Discussion Club, Film poster.

The PFI awards are a special distinction in the film industry. These are the only Polish awards, handed out in so many categories for significant achievements in dissemination and promoting Polish cinema. The awards honor the work of people and institutions that promote film culture, promote Polish cinema, and facilitate access to Polish filmmaking. Candidates for the award may be nominated by cultural institutions, film schools, local authorities, non-governmental institutions related to culture, and other entities operating in the cultural sector.

== The Oscar Selection Committee ==
The director of the Polish Film Institute appoints the Oscar Selection Committee, which selects a Polish candidate for an Oscar in the Best International Feature Film category. The Institute also supports a campaign increasing the film's chance of being on the Oscar shortlist. As part of the promotion of Polish candidates, a number of screenings are held for the members of the American Academy of Motion Picture Arts and Sciences.

Many years of operation of the Polish Film Institute - supporting Polish productions, festivals, reviews, and other film initiatives, film education, promotion of Polish cinematography abroad, and the development of cinemas have resulted, among others, in a growing cinema attendance at Polish productions

In 2020, the Polish Film Institute was honored with the Polish Film Award - the Eagle, awarded by the Polish Film Academy for "an extraordinary contribution to Polish cinema".
