= Zespół Filmowy "X" =

Polish film production studio

Zespół Filmowy X
- Industry: Film
- Founded: January 1, 1972
- Founder: Andrzej Wajda; Barbara Pec-Ślesicka; Constantine Puzyna
- Defunct: May 1, 1983
- Headquarters: Warsaw, Poland
- Products: Motion pictures, television films

Zespół Filmowy "X" was a Polish film production studio, inaugurated on New Year's Day, 1972. The studio's formation was the brainchild of acclaimed Polish director Andrzej Wajda, who served as the Artistic Director for the duration of the studio's existence.

== History ==
At this time in Poland, the custom of the Communist government's cultural authorities was to separate film production in to teams that functioned also as film schools for the novices in their employ. In the beginning, this was usually done regionally. It was also something of a reward system for the country's most highly regarded film directors, who were offered appointments as artistic director of the various teams. In late 1970 or early 1971, the Polish cultural authorities approached Andrzej Wajda, at that time enjoying a particularly fecund episode in his career coming off a string of international successes, with the possibility of directing one of these teams. After some hesitation, Wajda cautiously accepted this promotion.

Directing these teams was a tripartite affair and Wajda quickly surrounded himself with energetic young talents, appointing Barbara Pec-Ślesicka head of production and Constantine Puzyna as the team's literary director. In 1973, Puzyna stepped down and was replaced by Bolesław Michałek. Wajda, Pec-Ślesicka, and Michałek remained in these positions until May 1983, when in a period of martial law the team was forcibly shut down by the Polish government in retaliation for the political positions adopted by the team as manifested in the team's film product and in Wajda's, in particular, identification with the Solidarity (Polish trade union) movement.

Zespół Filmowy X's first production was the second film of enfant terrible Andrzej Żuławski, Diabeł (The Devil). This film - a lavish and diabolically surrealistic depiction of the effects of the aftermath of the Kościuszko Uprising and the Third Partition of Poland on a once noble-family in a bleak, wintry Polish countryside - was met immediately with stern condemnation from the Polish cultural authorities. The film existed under a state of suppression until 1987, when the film was finally released after the hardline of the government softened due to increasing pressure from within to open the society. This picture set the tone for the bulk of Zespół Filmowy X's output: challenging pictures with high artistic standards. The fallout from Diabeł's suppression earned greater scrutiny for the team from the authorities, Żuławski's departure for France and a climate of relaxed control, and exclusion of the team from cinemas, which had the effect of relegating for a time all the team's production to television.

Throughout the studio's existence these standards were maintained and the team produced several acclaimed pictures from several notable directors. The studio reached the pinnacle of cinematic achievement when Wajda's film Man of Iron collected the Palme d'Or and the Prize of the Ecumenical Jury at the 1981 Cannes Film Festival.

Of Zespół Filmowy X's atmosphere of openness, director Ryszard Bugajski recalled that:

Our team, as indeed this was true of all the teams, divisions, affiliates, unions, and delegations in Poland, was a simple bureaucratic institution of stamps, files, punches, official soap, and a bunch of kids attending night school. But it was also one of the few public places where, with a mug of hot tea brewed in a communal effort, almost like in Hyde Park's Speakers Corner in London, one could without brakes applied express different opinions - mostly unflattering of authority - surrounded by piles of unapproved scenarios, warmth and family. All in accordance with applicable rules of discipline, this was a place where one could work and celebrate the birthdays of friendly people and other anti-state occasions." - quoted in Wanda Werenstein's Zespół Filmowy "X"

== Filmography (selected) ==
- The Devil (1972), directed by Andrzej Żuławski.
- The Wedding (1972), directed by Andrzej Wajda.
- The Promised Land (1974), directed by Andrzej Wajda.
- W środku lata (In the Middle of Summer) (1975), directed by Feliks Falk.
- Obrazki z życia (Pictures of Life) (1976), an anthology film.
- Smuga cienia (The Shadow Line) (1976), directed by Andrzej Wajda.
- Motylem jestem czyli romans 40-latka (1976), directed by Jerzy Gruza.
- Zdjęcia próbne (Test Screenings) (1976), directed by Agnieszka Holland, Paweł Kędzierski and Jerzy Domaradzki.
- Man of Marble (1977), directed by Andrzej Wajda.
- Prawo Archimedesa (The Archimedes Principle) (1977), directed by Mariusz Walter.
- Indeks. Życie i twórczość Józefa M. (Index: The Life and Work of Joseph M.) (1977), directed by Janusz Kijowski.
- Pani Bovary to ja (I am Madame Bovary) (1977), directed by Zbigniew Kamiński.
- Sprawa Gorgonowej (The Gorgonowej Case) (1977), directed by Janusz Majewski.
- Rytm serca (Circadian Rhythm) (1977), directed by Zbigniew Kamiński.
- Wodzirej (Top Dog) (1977), directed by Feliks Falk.
- Pokój z widokiem na morze (A View of the Sea) (1977), directed by Janusz Zaorski.
- Quiet is the Night (1978), directed by Tadeusz Chmielewski.
- Without Anesthesia (1978), directed by Andrzej Wajda.
- Bestia (The Beast) (1978), directed by Jerzy Domaradzki.
- Provincial Actors (1978), directed by Agnieszka Holland.
- Young Girls of Wilko (1979), directed by Andrzej Wajda.
- Kobieta i kobieta (A Woman and a Woman) (1979), directed by Ryszard Bugajski.
- On the Move (1979), directed by Márta Mészáros.
- The Conductor (1979), directed by Andrzej Wajda.
- Obok (1979), directed by Feliks Falk.
- Kung-fu (1979), directed by Janusz Kijowski.
- Szansa (Chance) (1979), directed by Feliks Falk.
- Niewdzięczność (Ingratitude) (1979), directed by Zbigniew Kamiński.
- The Moth (1980), directed by Tomasz Zygadło.
- Fever (1980), directed by Agnieszka Holland.
- Głosy (Voices) (1980), directed by Janusz Kijowski.
- Spokojne lata (Quiet Years) (1981), directed by Andrzej Kotkowski.
- Man of Iron (1981), directed by Andrzej Wajda.
- Dziecinne pytania (Childish Questions) (1981), directed by Janusz Zaorski.
- Książę (The Prince) (1981), directed by Krzysztof Czajka.
- A Woman Alone (1981), directed by Agnieszka Holland.
- Był jazz (And All That Jazz) (1981), directed by Feliks Falk.
- Matka Królów (The Mother of Kings) (1982), directed by Janusz Zaorski.
- The Interrogation (1982), directed by Ryszard Bugajski.
- Danton (1983), directed by Andrzej Wajda.
- W obronie wlasnej (In Their Own Defense) (1982), directed by Zbigniew Kamiński.
- Planeta krawiec (The Planet Tailor) (1983), directed by Jerzy Domaradzki.
- Synteza (Synthesis) (1983), directed by Maciej Wojtyszko.
- Stan wewnętrzny (Inner State) (1983), directed by Krzysztof Tchórzewski.
- Wierna rzeka (The Faithful River) (1983), directed by Tadeusz Chmielewski.
- Święto księżyca (Feast of the Moon) (1983), directed by Maciej Wojtyszko.

== Bibliography ==
- Wertenstein, Wanda (1991). Zespół Filmowy "X". Warsaw: Wydawn. "Officina". ISBN 83-85208-09-7. Book
