= Monika Bolly =

Polish actress

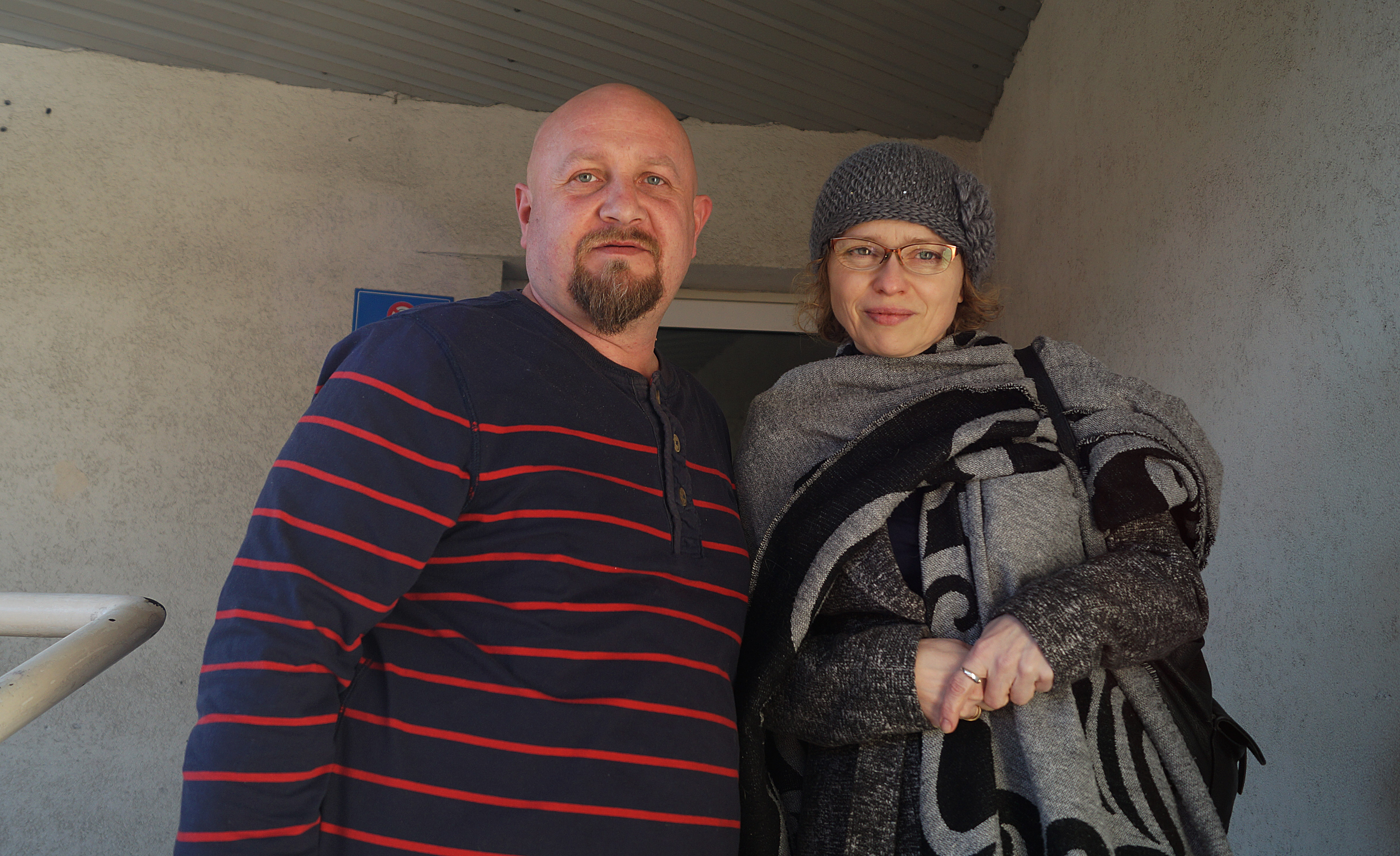
- Born: 1 February 1968 (age 58); Oleśnica
- Occupation: actress
- Years active: 1991- present

Monika Bolly (born 1 February 1968 in Oleśnica) is a Polish actress.

== Selected filmography ==
- 1990: Escape from the 'Liberty' Cinema
- 1994: Zawrócony
- 1995: Prowokator
- 1997: Lata i dni
- 1998-1999: Życie jak poker
- 2002-2008: Samo Życie
- 2005: Pierwsza miłość
- 2006: Hela w opałach
- 2012: Ja to mam szczęście!
- 2014: True Law
- 2016: Na Wspólnej
- 2018: Ślad
