= Shivers (1981 film) =

1981 Polish film

- Film poster
- Directed by: Wojciech Marczewski
- Written by: Wojciech Marczewski
- Produced by: Larry Mollin
- Starring: Tomasz Hudziec
- Cinematography: Jerzy Zieliński
- Edited by: Irena Chorynska
- Music by: Andrzej Trzaskowski
- Release date: 23 November 1981
- Running time: 106 minutes
- Country: Poland
- Language: Polish

Shivers (Polish pronunciation: [ˈdrɛʂt͡ʂɛ], Dreszcze) is a 1981 Polish drama film directed by Wojciech Marczewski. It was entered into the 32nd Berlin International Film Festival, where it won the Silver Bear - Special Jury Prize. At the time of its release it was banned by the Polish Communist government.

== Plot ==
Tomek (Tom) is a boy in Poland in 1955. His home life is mundane, yet tiresome; while looking through his father's library, he takes a small stamp of Madagascar from one of the books. In school, his teacher is crestfallen and cynical. During a poetry lesson where the teacher laments that he is not allowed to teach many great classics of Polish poetry due to the government, bullies throw a boy's hat out of the window. When he climbs out to attempt to fetch it, the teacher obliviously closes the window on his fingers, making him fall several floors to either great injury or death. Because of this, a new teacher arrives, who teaches in strict Stalinist theory. He is equally as ridiculed, and cannot control the students; yet he "volunteers" them for mandatory extracurriculars, such as agricultural work as part of a communist youth organization. On the way back from one of these trips, the class, dressed in red neckerchiefs and marching in file as the teacher has drilled them, is forced to walk directly against a crowd of churchgoers singing hymns.

The next day, Tom wakes up to find his home being raided by the secret police; he tries to save his father's book of stamps but is beaten and his father taken away to prison. Immediately afterwards, representatives from a "pioneer" camp visit the school, and Tom is chosen by a female Guide, a kind of camp counselor. There, life is strict, militarized, and surveilled. He is immediately singled out by an older boy, Jerzy, and his friend, Kazimierz, as someone they can trust and will not report their misbehavior. During the first dinner in camp, a window is smashed by a rock thrown by a teenager outside, and the pioneers are ordered by the camp counselors to apprehend the "provocateur". All except Tom flood out into the street, and we see later that the Guide is reprimanded by the headmaster, yet goes to the children and reaffirms that it was their "duty" to catch him. Later, Dominik, another boy in camp, is bullied by Jerzy and Kazimierz for having beaten the provocateur, by framing their bullying as a pro-communist interrogation and catching Dominik contradicting communist ideology. Jerzy and Kazimierz later take Tom to their "secret base", where they have alcohol and a radio capable of listening to Western frequencies; in which Tom hears of the 1956 Poznań protests. As the pioneer camp's education becomes more strictly authoritarian, encouraging students to snitch on their parents and write reports on their classmates as homework, Tom becomes more and more infatuated with the Guide who originally chose him.

Having only brought the Madagascar stamp from his home, he drops it in front of another student, who eventually outs him in front of a council of his peers who interrogate him. They accuse him of harboring colonialist views due to the implications; but the Guide simply instructs him to read a book on the relevant theory. Later, the Guide talks to Tom personally in her office, reviewing a report made of him by one of his classmates, as well as mentioning that she reads his letters home, prompting Tom to object. After the council, he receives his stamp back; going to the Guide to give it up, he overhears the headmaster and the Guide arguing over the recent Poznań protests. She catches him in the hallway, and embraces him for emotional support. He becomes even more immersed into communist ideology and the pioneers in an attempt to gain her attention and favor.

Jerzy, Kazimierz, and Tom later invite Dominik to their secret base, where Jerzy beats Dominik until he listens to the Western radio, as Tom begs him to stop. Days later, Dominik commits suicide, and Tom exposes Jerzy and Kazimierz in repentance. However, despite requesting to be expelled, he instead receives a promotion to the executive council due to his weeding out of "dangerous enemies". We see a sudden transformation into communist ideologue; his father, freed from prison, requests that he return home, to which he refuses with communist slogans. His extreme rhetoric even disturbs the Guide, who was the original purpose of this change. He then darkly prays to a portrait of Bolesław Bierut, under which a cross used to hang, and dreams of the Guide masturbating him. The pioneer organization is suddenly dissolved, with the children being forced onto trucks to be driven home; Tom loses a portrait of Marx in the chaos and attempts to retrieve it, but one of the counselors flings it away in the urgency. In the final scene, Tom pastes his Madagascar sticker to the window of the train.

== Cast ==
- Tomasz Hudziec as Tomek Żukowski
- Teresa Marczewska as Guide
- Marek Kondrat as Tutor
- Zdzislaw Wardejn as Inspector
- Władysław Kowalski as Father
- Teresa Sawicka as Mother
- Jerzy Bińczycki as Teacher Cebula
- Bogdan Koca as Tutor
- Zygmunt Bielawski as Centre manager
- Bogusław Linda as UB-officer
- Mieczyslaw Janowski as Tutor
- Wiktor Grotowicz as Headmaster
- Marian Opania as Zbyszek
- Ryszard Kotys as Guard
- Gosia Dobrowolska as Małgosia

Source.
