= The Beads of One Rosary =

1979 film written and directed by Kazimierz Kutz

- Polish: Paciorki jednego różańca
- Directed by: Kazimierz Kutz
- Written by: Kazimierz Kutz
- Starring: Augustyn Halotta, Ewa Wiśniewska, Franciszek Pieczka
- Cinematography: Wiesław Zdort
- Edited by: Józef Bartczak
- Music by: Wojciech Kilar
- Release date: 1979

The Beads of One Rosary (Polish: Paciorki jednego różańca) is a 1979 film written and directed by Kazimierz Kutz. The film received Golden Lions at the Polish Film Festival.

== Cast ==
Source.

- Augustyn Halotta as Karol Habryka
- Ewa Wiśniewska as Zosia
- Franciszek Pieczka as Jerzy
- Jan Bógdoł as Antek
- Marta Straszna as Bronka Habrykowa
- Stanisław Zaczyk as director Malczewski
- Tadeusz Madeja as Wybraniec
- Tadeusz Szaniecki as Chairman of the Works Council
- Jerzy Rzepka as Leszek, son of Antek and Zosia, grandson of Habryka
