= Jerzy Bińczycki =

Polish actor

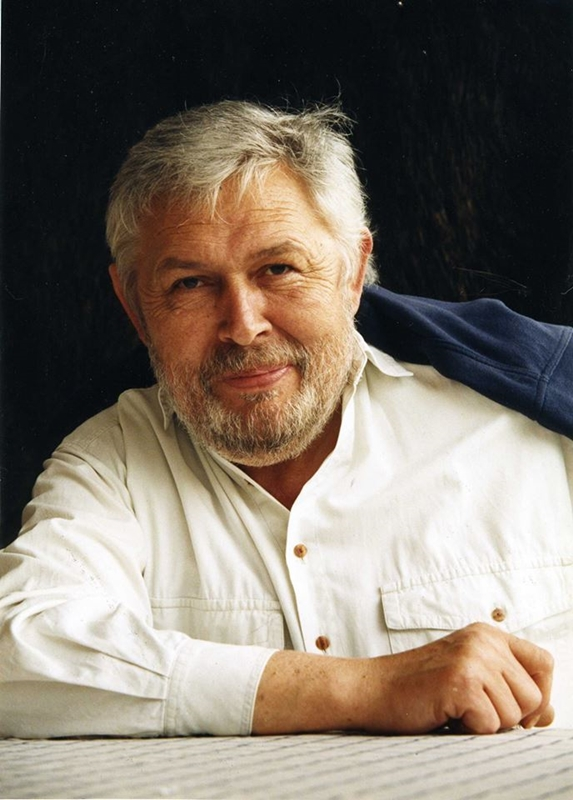
- Born: 6 September 1937; Kraków, Poland
- Died: 2 October 1998 (aged 61); Kraków, Poland
- Occupation: Actor
- Years active: 1962-1998

Jerzy Bińczycki (6 September 1937 – 2 October 1998) was a Polish stage and film actor. He appeared in 50 films between 1962 and 1998. He starred in the 1975 film Nights and Days, which was entered into the 26th Berlin International Film Festival.

Bińczycki was awarded the Officer's Cross of the Order of Polonia Restituta in 1989. He is buried at the Rakowicki Cemetery in Kraków.

== Partial filmography ==
- Drugi brzeg (1962)
- Koniec naszego swiata (1964) - Zyd na rampie
- Pięciu (1964) - Coalminer (uncredited)
- Goraca linia (1965)
- Skok (1969)
- Salt of the Black Earth (1970) - Bernard Basista
- Poludnik zero (1971) - Byk
- Family Life (1971)
- Szklana kula (1972) - Tourist
- Janosik (1974) - Straznik (uncredited)
- Orzel i reszka (1975) - Doctor
- Nights and Days (1975) - Bogumil Niechcic
- Dagny (1977) - Jan Kasprowicz
- Szpital Przemienienia (1979) - Engineer Andrzej Nowacki
- Podróz do Arabii (1980) - Dr. Andrzej
- W bialy dzien (1981) - Radca
- Ciosy (1981)
- Anna (1981) - Kozma
- Dreszcze (1981) - Cebula, nauczyciel jezyka polskiego
- The Quack (1982) - Prof. Rafał Wilczur
- Okno (1983) - Neighbour
- Na odsiecz Wiedniowi (1983) - Jan III Sobieski
- Okolice spokojnego morza (1983) - Cpt. Piotr Ziemba
- Diary for My Lovers (1987) - Professzor
- Magnat (1987) - Zbierski, Director of von Teusses' Mines
- Cienie (1988) - Józef
- Meskie sprawy (1989)
- Pilkarski poker (1989) - Football Association Official
- Powroty (1989) - Doktor Majeran
- Escape from the 'Liberty' Cinema (1990) - Cinema Manager Karwanski
- 30 Door Key (1991) - Prof. Filidor
- Listopad (1992) - Sara's father
- Superwizja (1993) - Ryszard Edman - chairman of 'SuperVision'
- Enak (1993) - Known Reporter
- Panna z mokra glowa (1994)
- Legenda Tatr (1995)
- Dzieje mistrza Twardowskiego (1996) - Professor Lukasz
- A hetedik szoba (1996) - University rector
- O dwóch takich, co nic nie ukradli (1999) - Professor
- Pan Tadeusz (1999) - Maciej Królik-Rózeczka
- Syzyfowe prace (2000) - Priest Wargulski
