= Kamila Dorbach =

Director of Polish Film Institute from 2025

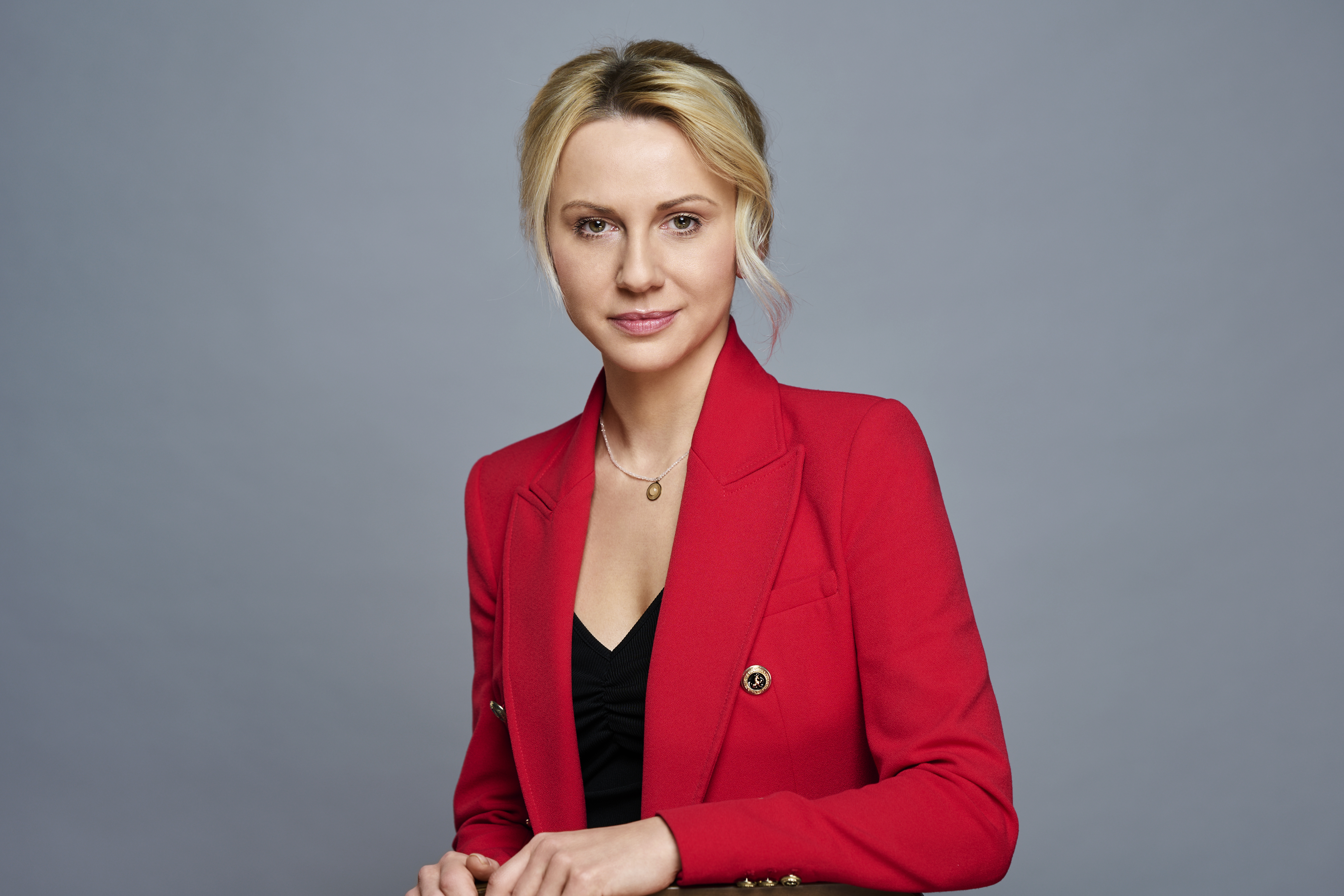
- Kamila Dorbach, 2025
- Education: KEN Pedagogical Academy in Kraków
- Occupation: Manager

Kamila Dorbach is a culture manager, acting director from April 2024, deputy director from July 2024, acting director again from October 2024, and director of the Polish Film Institute from June 2025.

== Biography ==
She completed a master's degree in international politics from the KEN Pedagogical Academy in Kraków. She completed postgraduate studies in cultural management at the Warsaw School of Economics.
