= Escape from the 'Liberty' Cinema =

1990 Polish film

- Film poster
- Directed by: Wojciech Marczewski
- Written by: Wojciech Marczewski
- Starring: Janusz Gajos
- Cinematography: Jerzy Zieliński
- Edited by: Elzbieta Kurkowska
- Music by: Zygmunt Konieczny; Jerzy Satanowski
- Release date: 15 October 1990
- Running time: 92 minutes
- Country: Poland
- Language: Polish

Escape from the 'Liberty' Cinema (Polish: Ucieczka z kina "Wolność") is a 1990 Polish drama film directed by Wojciech Marczewski. It was screened in the Un Certain Regard section at the 1991 Cannes Film Festival.

== Cast ==
- Janusz Gajos - The Censor
- Zbigniew Zamachowski - Deputy Censor
- Teresa Marczewska - Malgorzata
- Władysław Kowalski - Professor
- Piotr Fronczewski - Party Secretary
- Jerzy Bińczycki - Cinema Manager
- Michał Bajor - Film Critic
- Krzysztof Wakuliński - Małgorzata's Husband
- Artur Barciś - Projectionist
- Ewa Wiśniewska - Censor's Ex-Wife
- Monika Bolly - Censor's Daughter
- Maciej Kozłowski - American Actor
- Jan Peszek - Character Cut from Film
- Aleksander Bednarz - Edward
