= Reverted (film) =

1994 film

- Directed by: Kazimierz Kutz
- Written by: Kazimierz Kutz
- Produced by: Kazimierz Kowalski
- Starring: Zbigniew Zamachowski; Henryk Bista; Marek Kondrat
- Cinematography: Wiesław Zdort
- Music by: Jan Kanty Pawluśkiewicz
- Release date: 3 May 1994
- Running time: 79 minutes
- Country: Poland
- Language: Polish

Reverted (Polish: Zawrócony) is a 1994 Polish drama film directed by Kazimierz Kutz. It was entered into the 19th Moscow International Film Festival.

== Cast ==
- Zbigniew Zamachowski as Tomek Siwek
- Henryk Bista as Director Biernacki
- Marek Kondrat as Lieutenant Goliński
- Stanisław Górka as Militiaman Albin
- Zofia Rysiówna as Tomek's Mother
- Leszek Zduń as Young Worker
- Anna Waszczyk as Fela
- Maciej Maciejewski as Wedding Guest (as Wincenty Maciejewski)
- Magdalena Warzecha as Maciek's Wife
- Monika Bolly as Jadzia
- Krzysztof Janczar as Worker
- Ryszard Jabłoński as Worker
- Tomasz Schimscheiner as 'Solidarity' Member
