= Kazimierz Kutz =

Polish film director (1929–2018)

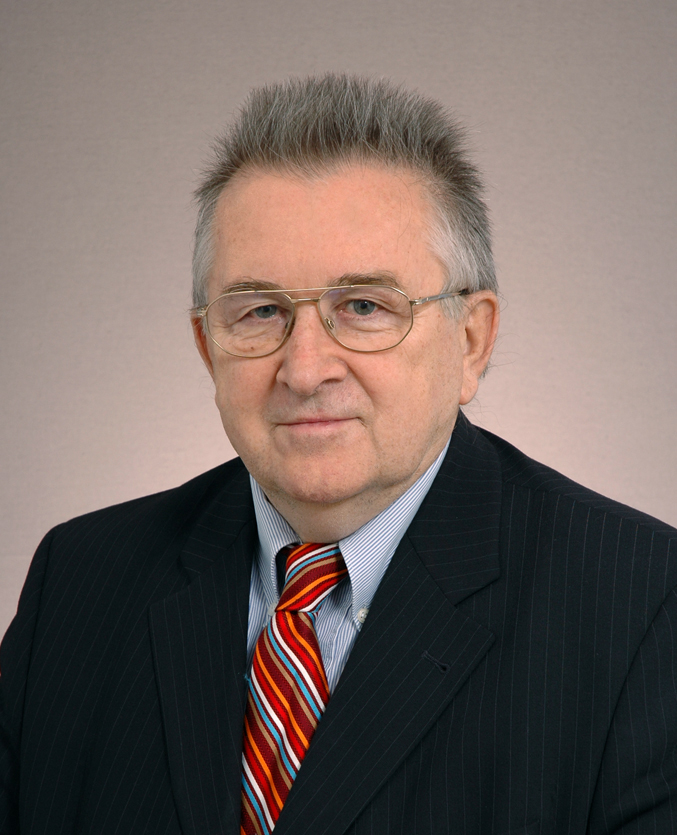
- Born: Kazimierz Julian Kutz; 16 February 1929; Szopienice, Autonomous Silesian Voivodeship
- Died: 18 December 2018 (aged 89); Warsaw, Poland
- Education: National Film School in Łódź
- Occupations: Film director, politician
- Spouse(s): 1. Krystyna Szerenkowska (divorced); 2. unknown (divorced); 3. Iwona Świętochowska-Kutz
- Children: 4
- Parent(s): Franciszek Kuc; Anastazja Kuc(née Kamińska)

Kazimierz Julian Kutz (16 February 1929 – 18 December 2018) was a Polish film director, author, journalist and politician, one of the representatives of the Polish Film School and a deputy speaker of the Senate of Poland.

== Biography ==
Kazimierz Kutz was born on 16 February 1929 in Szopienice, since 1960 district of Katowice, to a railway worker and a former partisan of the Silesian Uprisings. After the World War II Kutz graduated from gymnasium in Mysłowice and in 1949 was admitted to the Łódź Film School. After finishing his studies in 1954 he started working as an assistant to Andrzej Wajda.

His film debut was Krzyż Walecznych (1959). Since then he finished more than 20 pictures, including six about his home region - Silesia. He is also famous for directing theatre plays on some of the most prominent scenes of Poland, including National Stary Theatre in Kraków and National Theatre in Warsaw, as well as several plays for the Polish television. In 1972, he founded the Silesia Film Company in Katowice and, until 1978, was its Artistic Director.

In the 1970s he became the main director of the Polish Television branch in Katowice. He was also working for several branch and cultural organisations. After the Martial Law had been imposed in Poland in 1981 Kutz was interned by the communist authorities, but was released soon afterwards. Between 1981 and 1983, lectured in the Radio and Television Faculty at Silesian University in Katowice, and, between 1985 and 1991, taught directing at the Higher Theatre School in Kraków. Since 1987, was Principal Director in the Polish Television Centre in Katowice and, between 1990 and 1991, headed the Centre. After the peaceful transition to democracy in 1989 Kutz became the head of the Polish TV branch in Kraków (until 1991).

For his involvement in the matters of Silesia, and for his films depicting the traditions and problems of that part of Poland, he was considered by some the spokesman of all Silesians. In a plebiscite organised by Gazeta Wyborcza newspaper he was chosen the third most famous Silesian ever and the first among the people living at the time. In 1997 he was awarded with the title of doctor honoris causa by the University of Opole. He was a promoter and patron of several Silesia-based cultural feasts and societies, including the Festiwal Filmów Kultowych, Festiwal Sztuki Reżyserskiej, Cultural Congress of the Upper Silesia, Council of Culture of the Silesian Voivodship, Academy of Fine Arts in Katowice () and Committee for the Construction of Silesian Museum. He was also one of the supporters of development of the Silesian language.

His 1995 film Reverted was entered into the 19th Moscow International Film Festival.

In 1997 Kutz took part in the elections to the Senate of Poland (from the list of Freedom Union party, Katowice constituency) and was supported by approximately 500,000 Silesians. In 2001 he was elected for his second term as a non-partisan candidate, and in 2005 re-elected for the third term. Recently, he was the deputy speaker of the Senate of Poland. For his social involvements he was awarded with many of the highest Polish awards.

Kazimierz Kutz was married to Iwona and had two sons (Gabriel and Tymoteusz) and two daughters (Wiktoria and Kamila).

== Filmography ==
- 1958 – Krzyż walecznych
- 1960 – Nikt nie woła
- 1961 – Tarpany
- 1961 – Ludzie z pociągu
- 1963 – Milczenie
- 1964 – Upał
- 1966 – Ktokolwiek wie...
- 1967 – Skok
- 1969 – Salt of the Black Earth (Sól ziemi czarnej)
- 1971 – Pearl in the Crown (Perła w koronie)
- 1974 – Linia
- 1975 – Znikąd donikąd
- 1979 – The Beads of One Rosary (Paciorki jednego różańca)
- 1983 – Na straży swej stać będę
- 1986 – Wkrótce nadejdą bracia
- 1993 – Straszny sen Dzidziusia Górkiewicza
- 1994 – Reverted (Zawrócony)
- 1994 – Śmierć jak kromka chleba
- 1995 – Colonel Kwiatkowski (Pułkownik Kwiatkowski)
- 1997 – Sława i chwała
- 2004 – Stare srebra
