= Documentary and Feature Film Studios =

Film production company

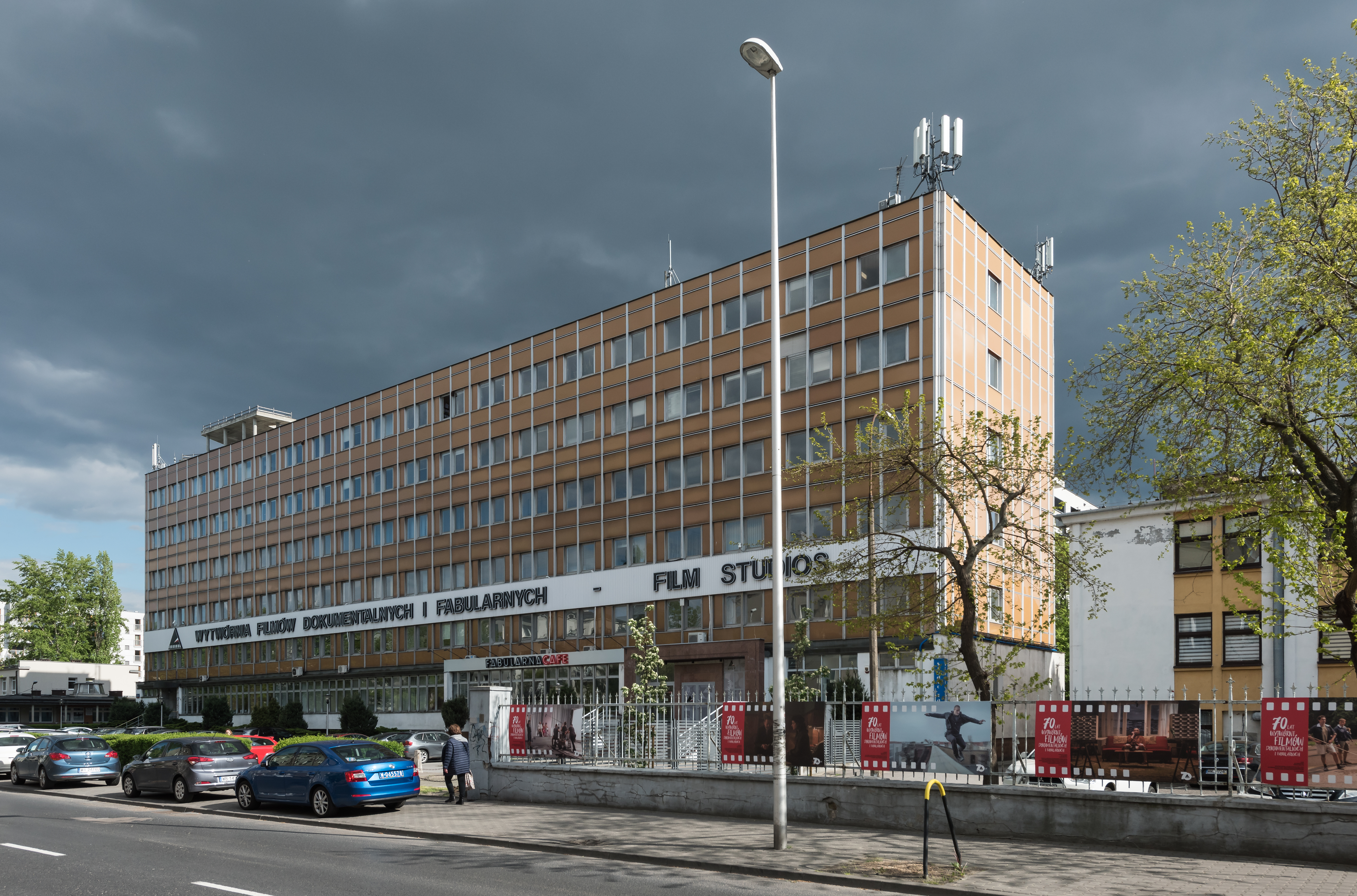
- Studio's headquarters
- Type: State-owned
- Founded: January 1, 1950; 76 years ago
- Headquarters: Warsaw, Poland
- Parent: Film Polski (formerly)
- Website: wfdif.pl

Documentary and Feature Film Studios (Polish: Wytwórnia Filmów Dokumentalnych i Fabularnych) is a Polish film production company.

Founded in 1949 as a unit of the film monopoly Film Polski, the institution has operated as both school and producer for Poland's leading documentary filmmakers.

Throughout the 1950s, the studio produced documentaries and newsreels for the Polish Film Chronicle. The studio also produced material for the Polish national television network, Telewizja Polska, as well as numerous promotional and commercial films for the industry. At the beginning of the 1960s, the studio began developing its ability to produce feature films. Initially it only produced a handful of feature films annually, but output quickly increased and in the 1970s production reached 20 feature films a year.

The celebrated Polish director Andrzej Wajda produced a number of his best films at the facility, including Man of Marble, Man of Iron, Landscape After Battle and The Wedding. Krzysztof Kieślowski also made use of the studio, producing his renowned television miniseries Dekalog here in 1988. Other notable television programs produced at the studio include Nights and Days (Noce i dnie) by Jerzy Antczak, Polish Roads (Polskie drogi) by Janusz Morgenstern and Home (Dom) by Jan Lomnicki, among others.

In 2019, the state cultural institutions Studio Filmowe "Kadr", Studio Filmowe "Tor", Studio Filmowe "Zebra" and Studio Miniatur Filmowych were merged into it and the resulting new state cultural institution was named Wytwórnia Filmów Dokumentalnych i Fabularnych.

== See also ==
- Cinema of Poland
- List of Polish language films
