= Studio Miniatur Filmowych =

Polish film studio (1958–2019)

- Type: Public
- Industry: Film and media
- Genre: Film production and film distribution
- Founded: May 1, 1958; 68 years ago
- Defunct: October 1, 2019
- Fate: Merged
- Successor: Warsaw Documentary Film Studio
- Headquarters: Królewicza Jakuba 12a, Warsaw, Poland

Studio Miniatur Filmowych was a Polish film studio, one of the oldest film producers in the country, operating since January 1, 1958 to October 1, 2019. The studio produced over 1,500 films, including original short films (including those by Piotr Dumała and Jan Lenica), children's series, and feature films. The last director of the studio was Włodzimierz Matuszewski. In October 2019, the studio was incorporated into the Warsaw Documentary Film Studio.

== History ==
It was established in 1958 in Warsaw. Since then, it has produced around 1,500 films, mainly animated, for children, teenagers and adults. It was one of 5 animation studios operating in the Polish People's Republic. The first major international co-production of SMF was the series Dwa koty i pies, in which private investors from the Netherlands and Poland and TVP contributed, among others. It was established as a result of the transformation of the Warsaw branch of the Studio Filmów Rysunkowych in Bielsko-Biała, operating as a state-owned enterprise. The branch of the Bielsko Studio was formed by Witold Giersz, Mieczysław Poznański and Leszek Kałuża. The structure of the Studio remained unchanged until 1990.

In 1995–1996, SMF, as the only Studio from outside the European Union (together with other studios from France, Great Britain, Germany, Spain and Belgium), participated in the production of the series Billy the Cat. In 1996–1998, the Studio co-produced the series Troubles (Ink-Tank/CTW).

Pursuant to the Order of the Minister of Culture and National Heritage of 3 September 2019, on 1 October 2019, the Film Miniatures Studio merged with the Tor, Zebra, KADR studios and the "old" WFDiF, on the basis of which the new Warsaw Documentary Film Studio was established.

== Productions ==
- Dziwne przygody Koziołka Matołka - The strange adventures of Koziołek Matołek - 1969-1971
- Pomysłowy Dobromir - The ingenious Dobromir - 1973-1975
- Pies, Kot I... - Dog, Cat and... - 1972/1975-1976
- Wędrówki Pyzy - Pyza's wanderings - 1977-1983
- O dwóch takich, co ukradli księżyc - About two guys who stole the moon - 1984
- Gucio i Cezar - Gucio and Caesar - 1976-1977
- Fortele Jonatana Koota - The stratagems of Jonatan Koot - 1980-1981
- Na tropie - On the trail - 1963
- Baśnie I Waśnie - Fairy Tales and Feuds - 1964
- Tajemnica szyfru Marabuta - The Mystery of the Marabou cipher - 1980
- Tryumf Pana Kleksa - The Triumph of Mr. Kleks - 2001 (Co-production with Sweden and Ireland)
