= Wojciech Marczewski =

Polish film director

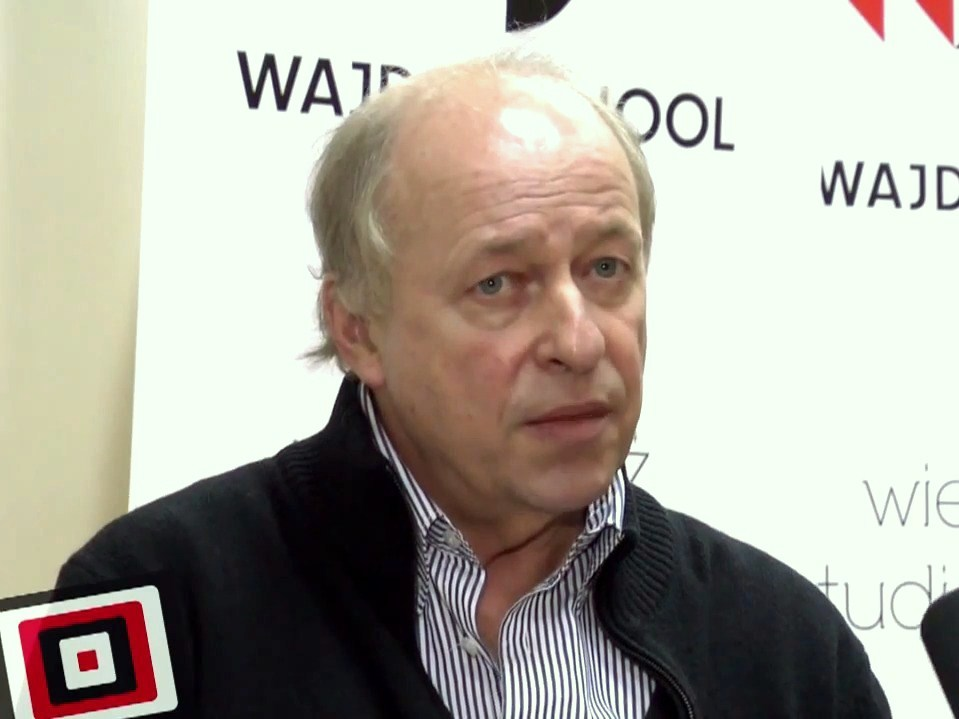
- Born: 28 February 1944 (age 82); Łódź, Poland
- Occupations: Film director Screenwriter
- Years active: 1968-2001

Wojciech Szczęsny Marczewski (born 28 February 1944) is a Polish film director and screenwriter. He directed twelve films between 1968 and 2001.

His 1981 film Dreszcze won the Silver Bear - Special Jury Prize at the 32nd Berlin International Film Festival. His film Ucieczka z kina "Wolność" was screened in the Un Certain Regard section at the 1991 Cannes Film Festival.

== Filmography ==
- Lekcja anatomii (1968)
- Most nad torami (1968)
- Podróżni jak inni (1969)
- Bielszy niż śnieg (1975)
- Wielkanoc (1975)
- Zmory (Nightmares) (1979)
- Klucznik (1980)
- Dreszcze (1981)
- Ucieczka z kina "Wolność" (1990)
- Czas zdrady (1997)
- Weiser (2001)
