= Sebastian Kudas =

Polish designer and illustrator (born 1978)

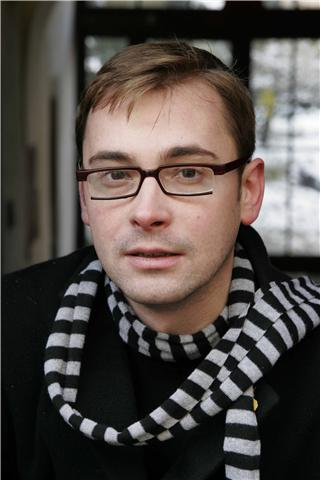
Sebastian Kudas

Sebastian Ludwik Kudas (born 31 August 1978, Kraków, Poland) is a Polish graphic artist (drawer), illustrator, and Piwnica pod Baranami's stage designer, graduated from VIII Prywatne Akademickie Liceum Ogólnokształcące in 1997.

Kudas has worked with "Piwnica pod Baranami" since 1995, thanks to Jerzy Skarżyński and Piotr Skrzynecki, as a stage designer. He created several dozen stage designs for Piwnica's performances (also abroad: Stockholm, Malmö, Oslo, Wien, Chicago, Toronto and New York), Piwnica artists' recitals and a documentary about Wisława Szymborska directed by Antoni Krauze.

As an illustrator, he worked with Jacek Kaczmarski, Ewa Lipska, Jan Nowicki, Jan Kanty Pawluśkiewicz and Janusz Radek. He illustrated publications, among others "Epitafia" by Wisława Szymborska, Ewa Lipska, Bronisław Maj, Michał Rusinek and Apologia Balceroviciana and Balceroviciana varia, published by café Nowa Prowincja. In 1999, together with Jan Kanty Pawluśkiewicz and Grzegorz Turnau, he founded "Chwilowa Grupa Artystyczna TRIO" (Temporary Artistic Group TRIO). The group had exhibitions in Gliwice, Bytom, Jelenia Góra and Kraków. In 2001, together with Barbara Stępniak-Wilk and Maciej Dancewicz, he founded "Grupa Apokryficzna" (Apocryphal Group). He worked as an assistant director with Antoni Krauze (a documentary about "Piwnica pod Baranami) and Marta Meszaros (a theatrical performance "Tramwaj zwany pożądaniem" - "Streetcar Named Desire").

Kudas cooperated with newspapers and magazines "Dziennik Polski", "Przekrój", "Zwierciadło" and "Bluszcz". His drawings were exhibited in Kraków, Sopot, Częstochowa, Sandomierz, Tarnobrzeg but also in Wien, Ebenfurth and Nuremberg.

In 1997 Kudas was chosen to Artistic Board of "Piwnica Pod Baranami". In 2007 his work earned him Wiesław Dymny's Award, awarded by Wiesław Dymny's Foundation in Montreal, for versatile an artistic activity.

== Bibliography ==
- Rainer Maria Rillke - GODZINKI/DAS STUNDENBUCH (Lublin 1997, 83-86236-61-2)
- Joanna Olczak- Ronikier - PIWNICA POD BARANAMI (Warszawa 1997, ISBN 83-7180-661-2)
- Jan Nowicki - MIĘDZY NIEBEM A ZIEMIĄ (Gdansk 2000, ISBN 83-87342-27-0)
- GRUPA APOKRYFICZNA (Kraków 2001, ISBN 83-86774-12-6)
- Leszek Wójtowicz - DOM NA GROBLACH (Warszawa 2003, ISBN 83-221-0752-8)
- Ewa Lipska, Sebastian L. Kudas - LEKTURA ISTNIENIA (Kraków 2004, ISBN 83-86774-32-0)
- Mateusz Kurcewicz - LUNAŚWIAT (Sekowo 2006, ISBN 83-921453-2-1)
- Wacław Krupiński - GŁOWY PIWNICZNE (Kraków 2007, ISBN 978-83-08-04103-1)
- Jerzy Illg - MÓJ ZNAK (Kraków 2009. ISBN 978-83-240-1282-4)
