= Ewa Demarczyk =

Polish singer, actress (1941–2020)

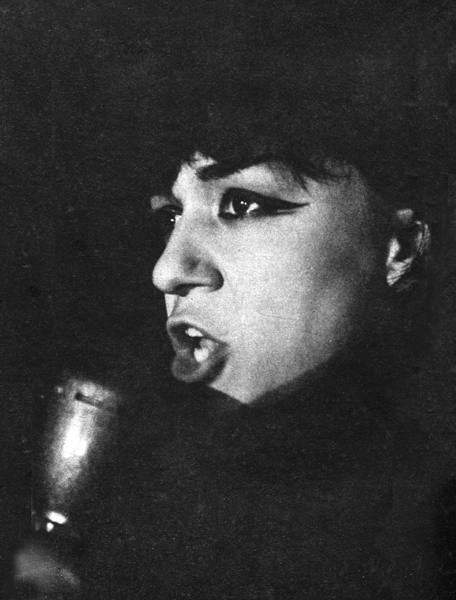
- Ewa Demarczyk in 1966.

Background information
- Born: 16 January 1941
- Origin: Kraków, Poland
- Died: 14 August 2020 (aged 79)
- Genre: sung poetry
- Occupation: singer
- Instrument: vocals
- Years active: 1961–2000
- Labels: Polskie Nagrania Muza, Wifon, Decca Records, Melodiya
- Formerly of: Piwnica pod Baranami

Ewa Maria Demarczyk (16 January 1941 – 14 August 2020) was a Polish singer, generally associated with the sung poetry genre and the Piwnica pod Baranami cabaret.

Demarczyk was recognized as one of the most talented and charismatic singers in the history of Polish music. She was praised for her unique interpretations, expression, and unusual stage personality. In the 1960s, she drew comparisons with Édith Piaf. In Poland, she was often referred to as "the Dark Angel".

== Biography ==
She started her career in 1961, when she joined Jagiellonian University Medical College's student cabaret Cyrulik. After a year she left Cyrulik for Piwnica pod Baranami, where she met Zygmunt Konieczny, with whom she would work for the next four years.

Her first big success was a performance at the 1963 National Festival of Polish Song in Opole, where she received an award for the songs "Karuzela z madonnami", "Taki pejzaż" and "Czarne anioły". Later the same year, she sang at the Sopot International Song Festival and was named the best artist of 1963 by Polish journalists. In 1964 she took second place in Sopot for "Grande Valse Brillante". She went on to perform at Olympia in Paris, at Bruno Coquatrix's invitation, as well as at a ceremony celebrating the 20th anniversary of United Nations.

In 1966, Demarczyk graduated from the Ludwik Solski Academy for the Dramatic Arts (however, she never had any film roles). The same year she teamed up with another composer, Andrzej Zarycki. 1967 saw the release of her first album, Ewa Demarczyk śpiewa piosenki Zygmunta Koniecznego, which proved to be a major success and was later certified platinum for selling over 100,000 copies.

At the turn of the 1960s and 1970s, she travelled extensively around the world to countries such as Italy, France, Germany, Cuba, Brazil, Mexico, United States, Australia, United Kingdom and Finland. She performed in numerous concert halls, including Carnegie Hall in New York and the Chicago Theatre.

Demarczyk left the Piwnica pod Baranami in 1972. Two years later her next album was issued, including some new Polish songs and four Russian-language versions of her previous hits. The album was released in Russia by the state-owned label Melodiya and sold several million copies. Later in the 1970s she was awarded an honorary award at Opole Festival and the Order of Polonia Restituta.

Her 1982 live album, simply titled Live, turned out to be a big success, achieving gold certification in Poland. In the mid-1980s Demarczyk founded her own theatre in Kraków. In spite of formal difficulties, it was soon shut down, although it generated interest. In the 1990s her albums were re-released on CD and Demarczyk received a number of awards recognising her input to Polish culture. She continued to perform live until the late 1990s.

She gave her last concert on 8 November 1999 at the Grand Theatre in Poznań and afterwards she completely withdrew from public life. In 2001 a foundation, Teatr Ewy Demarczyk, was created. She died on 14 August 2020, aged 79.

== Style ==
Demarczyk's repertoire consisted of demanding, not easily accessible interpretations of poems. Since her songs are often based on works by "classical" poets – both Polish such as Julian Tuwim and Krzysztof Kamil Baczyński and international like Goethe, Mandelstam, Rainer Maria Rilke, as well as avant-garde writers such as Miron Białoszewski – the genre that Demarczyk is associated with is called sung poetry.

In her performances, she united both dramatic theatrical expression and vocal art (she was a graduate of both a drama school and conservatory, where she studied the piano). The songs she performed were essentially short, intense musical dramas.

== Awards and honours ==
- 1962: 2nd Prize at the National Students' Song Festival for the song Karuzela z madonnami
- 1963: 1st Prize at the National Festival of Polish Song in Opole for the song Czarne anioły ("Black Angels")
- 1963: Special Award at the Sopot International Song Festival for the song Czarne anioły
- 1964: 2nd Prize at the Sopot International Song Festival for the song Grande Valse Brillante
- 1967: Prize at the World Theatre Festival in Arezzo, Italy
- 1969: 1st Prize at the Mondial du Theatre Festival in Nancy, France
- 1971: Gold Cross of Merit
- 1977: Officer of the National Order of the Legion of Honour, (France)
- 1978: Prize of the Ministry of Foreign Affairs of Poland for "outstanding contributions to the promotion of Polish culture abroad"
- 1978: City of Kraków Award
- 1979: Special Journalists' Award at the XVII National Festival of Polish Song in Opole
- 1979: Knight's Cross of the Order of Polonia Restituta
- 1990: Special Award at the XXVII National Festival of Polish Song in Opole for "outstanding achievements in the art of song interpretation"
- 1993: Special Award of the Polish Television
- 1997: Prize of the Kraków Voivodeship for "great artistic achievements as well as contributions to shaping the musical image of Poland"
- 2000: Commander's Cross of the Order of Polonia Restituta
- 2005: Gold Medal for Merit to Culture - Gloria Artis
- 2010: Gold Fryderyk Award for Lifetime Achievements
- 2011: Special Award of the TVP1 Channel for "a distinguished figure in the Polish culture"
- 2012: The Annual Award of the Ministry of Culture and National Heritage of the Republic of Poland for Lifetime Achievements
- 2017: Commander's Cross with Star of the Order of Polonia Restituta

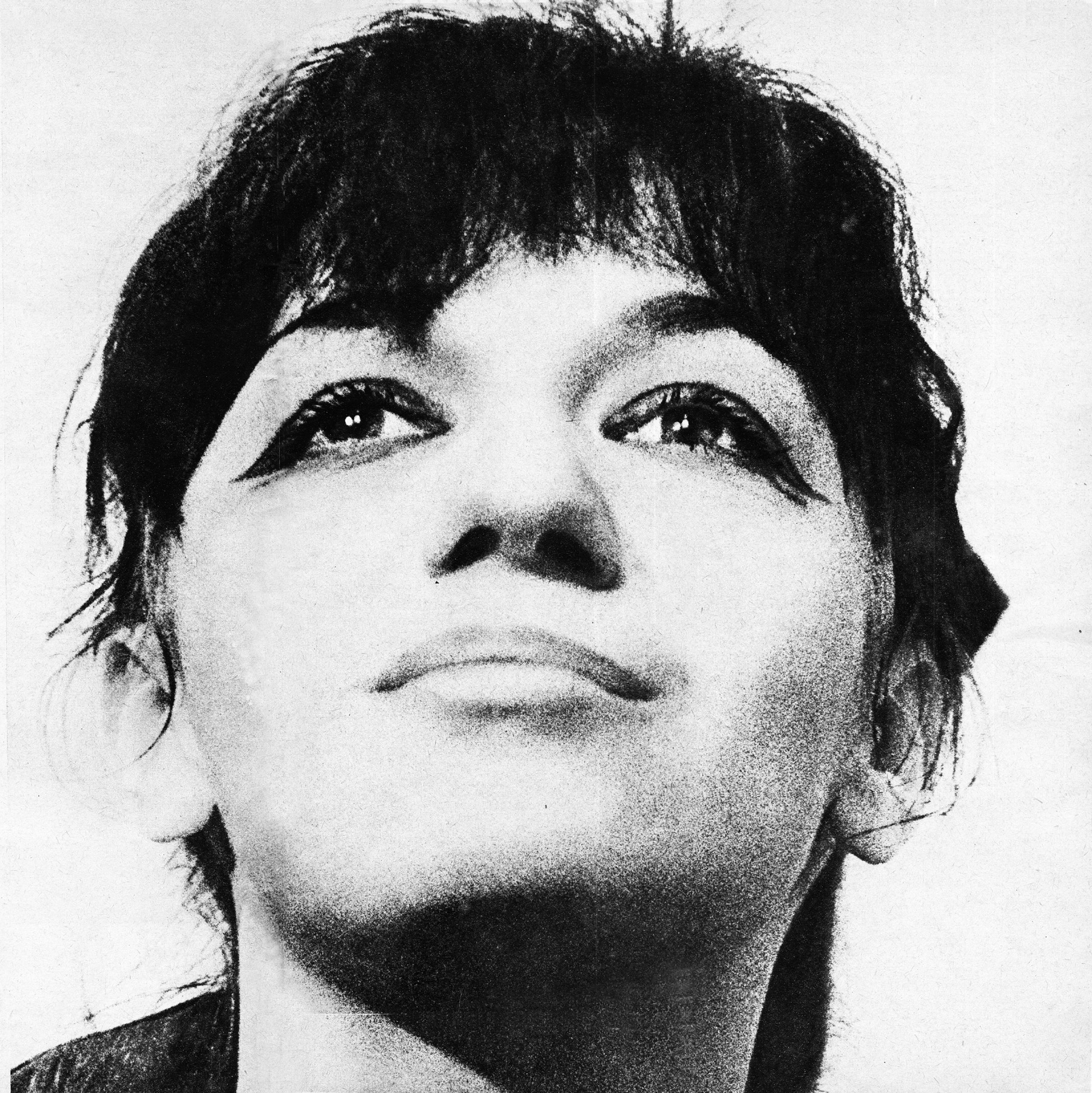
Ewa Demarczyk in 1966

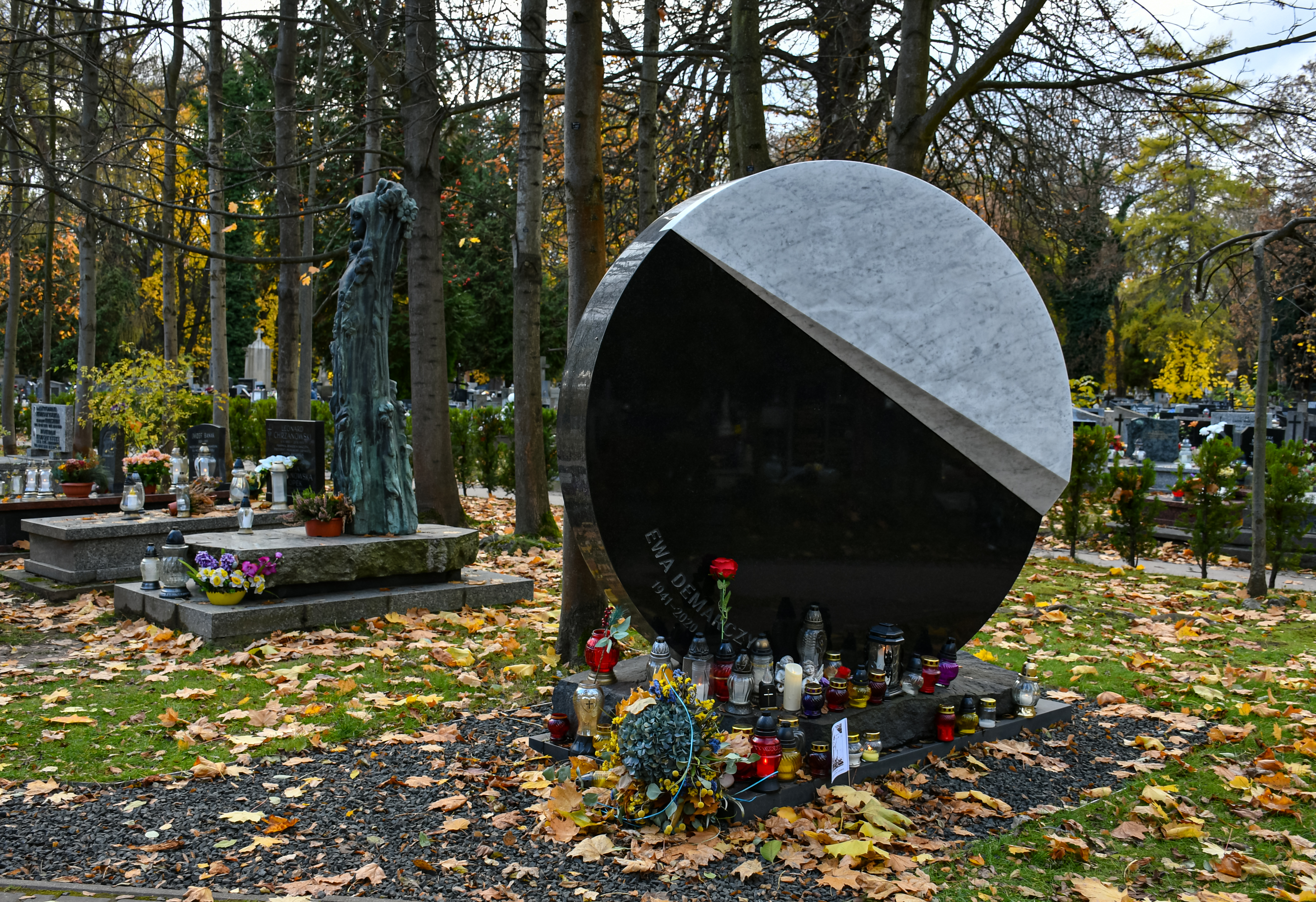
Tomb of Ewa Demarczyk Rakowicki Cemetery, 26 Rakowicka Street, Kraków

== Discography ==
Albums:

- 1967: Ewa Demarczyk śpiewa piosenki Zygmunta Koniecznego
- 1974: Ewa Demarczyk
- 1982: Live

Singles:

- 1963: Karuzela z madonnami / Czarne anioły / Taki pejzaż
- 1964: Grande Valse Brillante
- 1968: Grande Valse Brillante / Tomaszów
- 1974: Groszki i róże / Sur le pont d’Avignon / Jaki śmieszny / Cyganka / Zmory wiosenne

== List of songs ==
The list presents the songs sung by Ewa Demarczyk arranged in alphabetical order:

| Title | Author | Composer |
|---|---|---|
| Am Sonntagnachmittag | Stanisław Baliński | Leszek Długosz |
| Babuni | Marina Tsvetaeva | Andrzej Zarycki |
| Ballada o cudownych narodzinach Bolesława Krzywoustego | Gallus Anonymus | Andrzej Zarycki |
| Biegnie dziewczyna lasem | Bolesław Leśmian | Andrzej Zarycki |
| Canción de las voces serenas | Jaime Torres Bodet | Andrzej Zarycki |
| Cyganka | Osip Mandelstam | Andrzej Zarycki |
| Czarne anioły ("Black Angels") | Wiesław Dymny | Zygmunt Konieczny |
| Czerwonym blaskiem otoczona | Stanisław Ratold | Andrzej Zarycki |
| Dans bien longtemps | Robert Desnos | Andrzej Zarycki |
| Der Herbst des Einsamen | Georg Trakl | Andrzej Zarycki |
| Deszcze ("Rains") | Krzysztof Kamil Baczynski | Zygmunt Konieczny |
| Don Juan | Marina Tsvetaeva | Andrzej Zarycki |
| Folguj szczątkom swej młodości | Wisława Szymborska | Andrzej Zarycki |
| Garbus | Bolesław Leśmian | Zygmunt Konieczny |
| Grande Valse Brillante | Julian Tuwim | Zygmunt Konieczny |
| Groszki i róże | Julian Kacper | Zygmunt Konieczny |
| Il était une feuille | Robert Desnos | Andrzej Zarycki |
| Imię Twoje ("Your Name") | Marina Tsvetaeva | Andrzej Zarycki |
| Jaki śmieszny | Wincenty Faber | Zygmunt Konieczny |
| Karuzela z madonnami | Miron Białoszewski | Zygmunt Konieczny |
| Kląskały słodko słowiki | Joanna Olczak-Ronikier | Andrzej Zarycki |
| Kupcie szczeniaka | Tadeusz Śliwiak | Julian Kaszycki |
| Musik im Mirabell | Georg Trakl | Andrzej Zarycki |
| Nähe des Geliebten | Johann Wolfgang von Goethe | Andrzej Zarycki |
| Nie ma nas | Leszek Długosz | Andrzej Zarycki |
| Nieśmiertelniki | Bronisława Ostrowska | Andrzej Zarycki |
| O czemu pan | Agnieszka Osiecka | Zygmunt Konieczny |
| Opuszczony dom ("The Abandoned Home") | Wiesław Dymny | Adam Nowak |
| Osjan | Bolesław Leśmian | Zygmunt Konieczny |
| Palma sola | Nicolás Guillén | Andrzej Zarycki |
| Panna Śnieżna | Andrei Bely | Andrzej Zarycki |
| Pieśń nad Pieśniami | Solomon | Andrzej Zarycki |
| Piosenka pod choinkę | Leszek Długosz | Andrzej Zarycki |
| Pocałunki ("Kisses") | Maria Pawlikowska-Jasnorzewska | Zygmunt Konieczny |
| Pokochaj mnie ("Love Me") | Emanuel Schlechter | Robert Stolz |
| Przychodzimy, odchodzimy | Janusz Jęczmyk | Zygmunt Konieczny |
| Psalmen für den Hausgebrauch | Tadeusz Nowak | Andrzej Zarycki |
| Psalmy Dawida | David | Stanisław Radwan |
| Puchowy śniegu tren | Andrzej Włast | P. Arezzo |
| Purpurowe ciepłe słońce | Tadeusz Miciński | Andrzej Zarycki |
| Rebeka | Andrzej Włast | Zygmunt Białostocki |
| Ronda del fuego | Gabriela Mistral | Andrzej Zarycki |
| Samotność ("Loneliness") | Bolesław Leśmian | Andrzej Zarycki |
| Schattengetränk | Bolewsław Leśmian | Andrzej Zarycki |
| Skrzypek Hercowicz | Osip Mandelstam | Andrzej Zarycki |
| Słowiki ("Nightingales") | Joanna Olczak-Ronikier | Andrzej Zarycki |
| Smutna, niedokończona historia – Laura i on | Mikhail Lermontov | Krzysztof Litwin |
| Stary Cygan | J. Wima | Andrzej Zarycki |
| Sur le pont d’Avignon | Krzysztof Kamil Baczyński | Andrzej Zarycki |
| Szewczyk | Bolesław Leśmian | Jerzy Wysocki |
| Taki pejzaż | Andrzej Szmidt | Zygmunt Konieczny |
| Time long past | Percy Bysshe Shelley | Andrzej Zarycki |
| Tomaszów | Julian Tuwim | Zygmunt Konieczny |
| Wiersze wojenne ("War Poems") | Krzysztof Kamil Baczyński | Zygmunt Konieczny |
| Wiosenna noc w Starym Krakowie | Franciszek Serwatka | Franciszek Serwatka |
| Z ręką na gardle | Jerzy Skolimowski | Krzysztof Komeda |
| Zbyt młodam | Robert Burns | Andrzej Zarycki |
| Zmory wiosenne | Bolesław Leśmian | Andrzej Zarycki |
| Życie szare | Anna Akhmatova | Andrzej Zarycki |

== See also ==
- Polish music
- sung poetry
- Grzegorz Turnau
- Anna German
- Piwnica pod Baranami
- List of Poles

== Bibliography ==
- Angelika Kuźniak, Ewelina Karpacz-Oboładze: Czarny Anioł. Opowieść o Ewie Demarczyk : Znak, Społeczny Instytut Wydawniczy Sp.z o.o. : 2015 : ISBN 978-83-240-2049-2
