= Skrzynecki =

Skrzynecki is a Polish surname and may refer to:

- Jan Zygmunt Skrzynecki (1787–1860), Polish general, Commander-in-Chief of the November Uprising 1830–1831
- Peter Skrzynecki (born 1945), Australian poet of Polish origin
- Piotr Skrzynecki (1930–1997), Polish cabaret artist
