= August 11 =

August 11 this year in various calendars
- Tuesday, 11 August 2026
Akan	Nkyibene
Armenian	22 Nawasardi 1476
Aztec	Pānquetzaliztli 13, 6 Cipactli
Babylonian	27 Du'uzu, 2337 SE
Balinese pawukon	Luang, Pepet, Kajeng, Jaya, Keliwon, Urukung, Anggara of Tambir, Kala, Dadi, Pati
Bengali	27 Shrabon, BS 1433
Chinese	Yin Fire Snake・Turtle Beak Mansion; Fire Horse Year, Month 6, Day 29 (Liqiu, 12 days until Chushu)
Common Era	11 August 2026 CE
Coptic	5 Mesori, AM 1742
Egyptian	27 Choiak, 2775 NE
Ethiopian	5 Naḥasē, 2018 Amätä Məhrät
French Republican	Décade III, Quartidi de Thermidor de l'Année 234 de la République
Gregorian	11 August, AD 2026
Hebrew	28 Av, AM 5786
Hindu	Punarvasu・Siddhi; Solar: 26 Śrāvaṇa, 1948 SE; Lunisolar: Caturdaśī, Kṛishna pakṣa of Āṣāḍha, 2083 VE; Rāudra・5127 KY・1,872,798
Icelandic	Þriðjudagur, 17 Heyannir 2026
Islamic	26 Safar, AH 1448 (using tabular method)
ISO week date	2026-W33-2
Japanese	29 Minazuki, Reiwa 8 (Risshū, 12 days until Shosho)
Julian	29 July, AD 2026 (AM 7534)
Julian day	2461264
Korean	29 Yangdal, 4359 DE
Maya	13.0.13.15.1; 14 Yaxkin, 6 Imix
Roman	ante diem IV Kalendas Augustas, MMDCCLXXIX AUC
Solar Hijri	20 Mordad, SH 1405
Tibetan	29 chu stod, me pho rta 2153 or 1772 or 1000

<<	August					>>
Su	Mo	Tu	We	Th	Fr	Sa
						1
2	3	4	5	6	7	8
9	10	11	12	13	14	15
16	17	18	19	20	21	22
23	24	25	26	27	28	29
30	31
2026

August 11 in recent years
2026 (Tuesday)
2025 (Monday)
2024 (Sunday)
2023 (Friday)
2022 (Thursday)
2021 (Wednesday)
2020 (Tuesday)
2019 (Sunday)
2018 (Saturday)
2017 (Friday)

August 11 is the 223rd day of the year (224th in leap years) in the Gregorian calendar; 142 days remain until the end of the year.

== Events ==
=== Pre-1600 ===
- 3114 BC – The Mesoamerican Long Count calendar, used by several pre-Columbian Mesoamerican civilizations, notably the Maya, begins.
- 2492 BC – Traditional date of the defeat of Bel by Hayk, progenitor and founder of the Armenian nation.
- 106 – The south-western part of Dacia (modern Romania) becomes a Roman province: Roman Dacia.
- 117 – Hadrian is proclaimed Roman emperor, two days after Trajan's death.
- 355 – Claudius Silvanus, accused of treason, proclaims himself Roman Emperor against Constantius II.
- 490 – Battle of Adda: The Goths under Theodoric the Great and his ally Alaric II defeat the forces of Odoacer on the Adda River, near Milan.
- 923 – The Qarmatians of Bahrayn capture and pillage the city of Basra.
- 1315 – The Great Famine of Europe becomes so dire that even the king of England has difficulties buying bread for himself and his entourage.
- 1332 – Wars of Scottish Independence: Battle of Dupplin Moor: Scots under Domhnall II, Earl of Mar are routed by Edward Balliol.
- 1473 – The Battle of Otlukbeli: Mehmed the Conqueror of the Ottoman Empire decisively defeats Uzun Hassan of Aq Qoyunlu.
- 1492 – Rodrigo de Borja is elected as Head of the Catholic Church, taking the name Pope Alexander VI.

=== 1601–1900 ===
- 1675 – Franco-Dutch War: Forces of the Holy Roman Empire defeat the French in the Battle of Konzer Brücke.
- 1685 – Morean War: The 49-day Siege of Coron ends with the surrender and massacre of its garrison by the Venetians.
- 1786 – Captain Francis Light establishes the British colony of Penang in Malaysia.
- 1804 – Francis II assumes the title of first Emperor of Austria.
- 1812 – Peninsular War: French troops engage British-Portuguese forces in the Battle of Majadahonda.
- 1813 – In Colombia, Juan del Corral declares the independence of Antioquia.
- 1858 – The Eiger in the Bernese Alps is ascended for the first time by Charles Barrington accompanied by Christian Almer and Peter Bohren.
- 1871 – An explosion of guncotton occurs in Stowmarket, England, killing 28.
- 1898 – Spanish–American War: American troops enter the city of Mayagüez, Puerto Rico.

=== 1901–present ===
- 1918 – World War I: The Battle of Amiens ends.
- 1919 – Germany's Weimar Constitution is signed into law.
- 1920 – The 1920 Cork hunger strike begins which eventually results in the deaths of three Irish Republicans including the Lord Mayor of Cork Terence MacSwiney.
- 1920 – The Latvian–Soviet Peace Treaty, which relinquished Russia's authority and pretenses to Latvia, is signed, ending the Latvian War of Independence.
- 1929 – Babe Ruth becomes the first baseball player to hit 500 home runs in his career with a home run at League Park in Cleveland, Ohio.
- 1934 – The first civilian prisoners arrive at the Federal prison on Alcatraz Island.
- 1942 – Actress Hedy Lamarr and composer George Antheil receive a patent for a Frequency-hopping spread spectrum communication system that later became the basis for modern technologies in wireless telephones, two-way radio communications, and Wi-Fi.
- 1945 – Poles in Kraków engage in a pogrom against Jews in the city, killing one and wounding five.
- 1952 – Hussein bin Talal is proclaimed King of Jordan.
- 1959 – Sheremetyevo International Airport, the second-largest airport in Russia, opens.
- 1960 – Chad declares independence from France.
- 1961 – The former Portuguese territories in India of Dadra and Nagar Haveli are merged to create the Union Territory Dadra and Nagar Haveli.
- 1962 – Vostok 3 launches from the Baikonur Cosmodrome and cosmonaut Andrian Nikolayev becomes the first person to float in microgravity.
- 1965 – Race riots (the Watts Riots) begin in the Watts area of Los Angeles, California.
- 1969 – The Apollo 11 astronauts are released from a three-week quarantine following their liftoff from the Moon.
- 1972 – Vietnam War: The last United States ground combat unit leaves South Vietnam.
- 1973 – At the 1520 Sedgwick Avenue apartment building in The Bronx, New York, DJ Kool Herc hosts a house party widely considered to mark the birthplace of hip-hop culture and music. DJ Kool Herc demonstrates a new technique of beat juggling and Coke La Rock performs a new style of vocal performance called rapping.
- 1975 – East Timor: Governor Mário Lemos Pires of Portuguese Timor abandons the capital Dili, following a coup by the Timorese Democratic Union (UDT) and the outbreak of civil war between UDT and Fretilin.
- 1979 – Two Aeroflot Tupolev Tu-134s collide over the Ukrainian city of Dniprodzerzhynsk and crash, killing all 178 aboard both airliners.
- 1982 – A bomb explodes on Pan Am Flight 830, en route from Tokyo, Japan to Honolulu, Hawaii, killing one passenger and injuring 15 others.
- 1984 – "We begin bombing in five minutes": United States President Ronald Reagan, while running for re-election, jokes while preparing to make his weekly Saturday address on National Public Radio.
- 1988 – A meeting between Sayyed Imam Al-Sharif, Osama bin Laden, Abdullah Yusuf Azzam, and leaders of Egyptian Islamic Jihad in Afghanistan culminates in the formation of Al-Qaeda.
- 1991 – Nickelodeon's first line of "Nicktoons" (Doug, Rugrats and Ren & Stimpy) premiere on the channel.
- 1992 – The Mall of America in Bloomington, Minnesota opens. At the time, it is the largest shopping mall in the United States.
- 1995 – The Russell Hill subway accident in Toronto kills three and injures 30, due to a combination of human error and a safety system design flaw.
- 1996 – The killing of Tassos Isaac by Turkish nationalists of the Grey Wolves in the United Nations Buffer Zone in Cyprus.
- 2000 – An air rage incident occurs on board Southwest Airlines Flight 1763 when 19-year-old Jonathan Burton attempts to storm the cockpit, but he is subdued by other passengers and dies from his injuries.
- 2003 – NATO takes over command of the peacekeeping force in Afghanistan, marking its first major operation outside Europe in its 54-year-history.
- 2003 – Jemaah Islamiyah leader Riduan Isamuddin, better known as Hambali, is arrested in Bangkok, Thailand.
- 2006 – The oil tanker MT Solar 1 sinks off the coast of Guimaras and Negros Islands in the Philippines, causing the country's worst oil spill.
- 2012 – At least 306 people are killed and 3,000 others injured in a pair of earthquakes near Tabriz, Iran.
- 2017 – At least 41 people are killed and another 179 injured after two passenger trains collide in Alexandria, Egypt.
- 2023 – Luna 25 launches from the Vostochny Cosmodrome.

== Births ==
=== Pre-1600 ===
- 1086 – Henry V, Holy Roman Emperor (died 1125)
- 1384 – Yolande of Aragon (died 1442)
- 1472 – Nikolaus von Schönberg, Catholic cardinal (died 1537)
- 1510 – Margaret Paleologa, Sovereign Marchioness of Montferrat (died 1566)

=== 1601–1900 ===
- 1673 – Richard Mead, English physician and astrologer (died 1754)
- 1718 – Frederick Haldimand, Swiss-English general and politician, 22nd Governor of Quebec (died 1791)
- 1722 – Richard Brocklesby, English physician (died 1797)
- 1748 – Joseph Schuster, German composer (died 1812)
- 1778 – Friedrich Ludwig Jahn, Prussian gymnast, educator, and politician (died 1852)
- 1794 – James B. Longacre, American engraver (died 1869)
- 1807 – David Rice Atchison, American general, lawyer, and politician (died 1886)
- 1808 – William W. Chapman, American lawyer and politician (died 1892)
- 1816 – Frederick Innes, Scottish-Australian politician, 9th Premier of Tasmania (died 1882)
- 1833 – Robert G. Ingersoll, American soldier, lawyer, and politician (died 1899)
- 1833 – Kido Takayoshi, Japanese samurai and politician (died 1877)
- 1836 – Warren Brown, American historian and politician (died 1919)
- 1837 – Marie François Sadi Carnot, French engineer and politician, 4th President of the French Republic (died 1894)
- 1855 – John Hodges, Australian cricketer (died 1933)
- 1858 – Christiaan Eijkman, Dutch physician and academic, Nobel Prize laureate (died 1930)
- 1860 – Ottó Bláthy, Hungarian engineer and chess player (died 1939)
- 1870 – Tom Richardson, English cricketer (died 1912)
- 1874 – Princess Louise Charlotte of Saxe-Altenburg (died 1953)
- 1877 – Adolph M. Christianson, American lawyer and judge (died 1954)
- 1878 – Oliver W. F. Lodge, English poet and author (died 1955)
- 1881 – Aleksander Aberg, Estonian wrestler (died 1920)
- 1884 – Hermann Wlach, Austrian-Swiss actor (died 1962)
- 1885 – Stephen Butterworth, English physicist and engineer (died 1958)
- 1891 – Stancho Belkovski, Bulgarian architect and educator (died 1962)
- 1891 – Edgar Zilsel, Austrian historian and philosopher of science, linked to the Vienna Circle (died 1944)
- 1892 – Hugh MacDiarmid, Scottish poet and linguist (died 1978)
- 1892 – Eiji Yoshikawa, Japanese author (died 1962)
- 1897 – Enid Blyton, English author, poet, and educator (died 1968)
- 1897 – Louise Bogan, American poet and critic (died 1970)
- 1898 – Peter Mohr Dam, Faroese educator and politician, 3rd Prime Minister of the Faroe Islands (died 1968)
- 1900 – Charley Paddock, American sprinter (died 1943)
- 1900 – Philip Phillips, American archaeologist and scholar (died 1994)

=== 1901–present ===
- 1902 – Alfredo Binda, Italian cyclist (died 1986)
- 1902 – Lloyd Nolan, American actor (died 1985)
- 1902 – Christian de Castries, French general (died 1991)
- 1905 – Erwin Chargaff, Austrian-American biochemist and academic (died 2002)
- 1905 – Ernst Jaakson, Estonian diplomat (died 1998)
- 1907 – Ted a'Beckett, Australian cricketer and lawyer (died 1989)
- 1908 – Don Freeman, American author and illustrator (died 1978)
- 1908 – Torgny T:son Segerstedt, Swedish sociologist and philosopher (died 1999)
- 1909 – Yūji Koseki, Japanese composer (died 1989)
- 1909 – Uku Masing, Estonian philosopher and theologian (died 1985)
- 1911 – Thanom Kittikachorn, Thai field marshal and politician, 10th Prime Minister of Thailand (died 2004)
- 1912 – Eva Ahnert-Rohlfs, German astronomer and academic (died 1954)
- 1912 – Raphael Blau, American screenwriter and producer (died 1996)
- 1913 – Paul Dupuis, Canadian actor (died 1976)
- 1913 – Bob Scheffing, American baseball player and manager (died 1985)
- 1913 – Angus Wilson, English author and academic (died 1991)
- 1915 – Morris Weiss, American author and illustrator (died 2014)
- 1916 – Johnny Claes, English-Belgian race car driver and trumpet player (died 1956)
- 1919 – Luis Olmo, Puerto Rican-American baseball player and manager (died 2017)
- 1920 – Mike Douglas, American singer and talk show host (died 2006)
- 1920 – Chuck Rayner, Canadian ice hockey player (died 2002)
- 1921 – Alex Haley, American historian and author (died 1992)
- 1922 – Mavis Gallant, Canadian short story writer (died 2014)
- 1922 – John "Mule" Miles, American baseball player (died 2013)
- 1923 – Stan Chambers, American journalist and actor (died 2015)
- 1925 – Floyd Curry, Canadian ice hockey player and manager (died 2006)
- 1925 – Arlene Dahl, American actress, businesswoman and writer (died 2021)
- 1926 – Aaron Klug, Lithuanian-English chemist and biophysicist, Nobel Prize laureate (died 2018)
- 1927 – Raymond Leppard, English harpsichord player and conductor (died 2019)
- 1927 – Stuart Rosenberg, American director and producer (died 2007)
- 1929 – Manabendra Mukhopadhyay, Indian singer (died 1992)
- 1932 – Fernando Arrabal, Spanish actor, director, and playwright
- 1932 – Izzy Asper, Canadian lawyer, businessman, and politician, founded Canwest (died 2003)
- 1932 – Geoffrey Cass, English businessman
- 1932 – Peter Eisenman, American architect, designed the City of Culture of Galicia
- 1932 – John Gorrie, English director and screenwriter
- 1933 – Jerry Falwell, American minister and television host (died 2007)
- 1933 – Jerzy Grotowski, Polish director and producer (died 1999)
- 1933 – Teri Shields, American actress, mother, and manager (died 2012)
- 1933 – Tamás Vásáry, Hungarian pianist and conductor (died 2026)
- 1934 – Bob Hepple, South African lawyer and academic (died 2015)
- 1936 – Andre Dubus, American short story writer, essayist, and memoirist (died 1999)
- 1936 – Bill Monbouquette, American baseball player and coach (died 2015)
- 1936 – Jonathan Spence, English-American historian and academic (died 2021)
- 1937 – Anna Massey, English actress (died 2011)
- 1937 – Patrick Joseph McGovern, American businessman, founded International Data Group (died 2014)
- 1939 – James Mancham, first President of Seychelles (died 2017)
- 1939 – Ronnie Dawson, American singer and guitarist (died 2003)
- 1940 – Glenys Page, New Zealand cricketer (died 2012)
- 1941 – John Ellison, American-Canadian musician and songwriter
- 1942 – Mike Hugg, English drummer and keyboard player
- 1942 – Otis Taylor, American football player (died 2023)
- 1943 – Jim Kale, Canadian bass player
- 1943 – Kenny Gamble, American songwriter, and "Philadelphia Soul" producer, with Leon Huff
- 1943 – Pervez Musharraf, Pakistani general and politician, 10th President of Pakistan (died 2023)
- 1943 – Denis Payton, English saxophonist (died 2006)
- 1944 – Martin Linton, Swedish-English journalist and politician
- 1944 – Frederick W. Smith, American businessman, founded FedEx (died 2025)
- 1944 – Ian McDiarmid, Scottish actor
- 1946 – John Conlee, American singer-songwriter
- 1946 – Marilyn vos Savant, American journalist and author
- 1947 – Theo de Jong, Dutch footballer, coach, and manager
- 1947 – Georgios Karatzaferis, Greek journalist and politician
- 1947 – Wilma van den Berg, Dutch sprinter
- 1948 – Don Boyd, Scottish director, producer, and screenwriter
- 1949 – Eric Carmen, American singer-songwriter and guitarist (died 2024)
- 1949 – Tim Hutchinson, American lawyer and politician
- 1949 – Ian Charleson, Scottish-English actor and singer (died 1990)
- 1950 – Erik Brann, American singer-songwriter and guitarist (died 2003)
- 1950 – Gennadiy Nikonov, Russian engineer, designed the AN-94 rifle (died 2003)
- 1950 – Steve Wozniak, American computer scientist and programmer, co-founded Apple Inc.
- 1952 – Reid Blackburn, American photographer (died 1980)
- 1952 – Bob Mothersbaugh, American singer, guitarist, and producer
- 1953 – Hulk Hogan, American professional wrestler (died 2025)
- 1953 – Wijda Mazereeuw, Dutch swimmer
- 1954 – Bryan Bassett, American guitarist
- 1954 – Vance Heafner, American golfer and coach (died 2012)
- 1954 – Joe Jackson, English singer-songwriter and musician
- 1954 – Tarmo Rüütli, Estonian footballer, coach, and manager
- 1954 – Yashpal Sharma, Indian cricketer and umpire (died 2021)
- 1955 – Marc Bureau, Canadian politician, 16th Mayor of Gatineau
- 1955 – Sylvia Hermon, Northern Irish academic and politician
- 1956 – Pierre-Louis Lions, French mathematician and academic
- 1957 – Ian Stuart Donaldson, English singer-songwriter and guitarist (died 1993)
- 1957 – Masayoshi Son, Japanese technology entrepreneur and investor
- 1958 – Steven Pokere, New Zealand rugby player
- 1958 – Jah Wobble, English singer-songwriter and bass player
- 1959 – Gustavo Cerati, Argentinian singer-songwriter, guitarist, and producer (died 2014)
- 1959 – Yoshiaki Murakami, Japanese businessman
- 1959 – Taraki Sivaram, Sri Lankan journalist and author (died 2005)
- 1959 – Richard Scudamore, English businessman
- 1959 – László Szlávics, Jr., Hungarian sculptor
- 1961 – David Brooks, American journalist and author
- 1961 – Craig Ehlo, American basketball player and coach
- 1961 – Suniel Shetty, Indian actor and film producer
- 1962 – Brian Azzarello, American author
- 1962 – Charles Cecil, English video game designer and co-founded Revolution Software
- 1962 – John Micklethwait, English journalist and author
- 1962 – Rob Minkoff, American director and producer
- 1963 – Hiromi Makihara, Japanese baseball player
- 1964 – Jim Lee, South Korean-American author and illustrator
- 1964 – Grant Waite, New Zealand golfer
- 1965 – Marc Bergevin, Canadian ice hockey player and manager
- 1965 – Embeth Davidtz, American actress
- 1965 – Viola Davis, American actress
- 1966 – Nigel Martyn, English footballer and coach
- 1966 – Juan María Solare, Argentinian pianist and composer
- 1967 – Massimiliano Allegri, Italian footballer and manager
- 1967 – Enrique Bunbury, Spanish singer-songwriter and guitarist
- 1967 – Joe Rogan, American actor, comedian, and television host
- 1967 – Petter Wettre, Norwegian saxophonist and composer
- 1968 – Anna Gunn, American actress
- 1968 – Veda Hille, Canadian experimental pop singer-songwriter, keyboard player, and accordionist
- 1968 – Sophie Okonedo, British actress
- 1968 – Charlie Sexton, American singer-songwriter and guitarist
- 1970 – Andy Bell, British musician and songwriter
- 1970 – Dirk Hannemann, German footballer and manager
- 1970 – Gianluca Pessotto, Italian footballer
- 1971 – Alejandra Barros, Mexican actress and screenwriter
- 1971 – Tommy Mooney, English footballer
- 1973 – Kristin Armstrong, American cyclist
- 1974 – Marie-France Dubreuil, Canadian figure skater
- 1974 – Hadiqa Kiani, Pakistani singer, songwriter and philanthropist
- 1974 – Audrey Mestre, French biologist and diver (died 2002)
- 1974 – Carolyn Murphy, American model and actress
- 1975 – Chris Cummings, Canadian singer-songwriter
- 1976 – Iván Córdoba, Colombian footballer and manager
- 1976 – Bubba Crosby, American baseball player
- 1976 – Will Friedle, American actor and screenwriter
- 1976 – Ben Gibbard, American singer-songwriter and guitarist
- 1976 – Ľubomír Višňovský, Slovak ice hockey player
- 1977 – Gemma Hayes, Irish singer-songwriter
- 1977 – Dênio Martins, Brazilian footballer
- 1978 – Spyros Gogolos, Greek footballer
- 1978 – Charlotte Leslie, British politician
- 1978 – Lillian Nakate, Ugandan politician
- 1978 – Isy Suttie, English comedian, musician, actress, and writer
- 1979 – Walter Ayoví, Ecuadorian footballer
- 1980 – Daniel Lloyd, English cyclist and sportscaster
- 1980 – Lee Suggs, American football player
- 1981 – Daniel Poohl, Swedish journalist
- 1982 – Andy Lee, American football player
- 1983 – Chris Hemsworth, Australian actor
- 1983 – Luke Lewis, Australian rugby league player
- 1983 – Pavel 183, Russian painter (died 2013)
- 1984 – Mojtaba Abedini, Iranian Olympic fencer
- 1984 – Melky Cabrera, Dominican baseball player
- 1984 – Lucas di Grassi, Brazilian race car driver
- 1985 – Jacqueline Fernandez, Bahraini–Sri Lankan actress
- 1985 – Asher Roth, American rapper
- 1986 – Mokhtar Benmoussa, Algerian footballer
- 1986 – Hélène Defrance, French sailor
- 1986 – Pablo Sandoval, Venezuelan baseball player
- 1987 – Dany N'Guessan, French footballer
- 1987 – Drew Storen, American baseball player
- 1988 – Rabeh Al-Hussaini, Filipino basketball player
- 1988 – Patty Mills, Australian basketball player
- 1988 – Mustafa Pektemek, Turkish footballer
- 1989 – Junior Heffernan, Irish cyclist and triathlete (died 2013)
- 1989 – Sebastian Huke, German footballer
- 1990 – Lenka Juríková, Slovak tennis player
- 1991 – Cristian Tello, Spanish footballer
- 1992 – Tomi Lahren, American conservative political commentator
- 1993 – Alyson Stoner, American actor, singer, and dancer
- 1994 – Storm Sanders, Australian tennis player
- 1994 – Anton Cooper, New Zealand cross-country cyclist
- 1994 – Joseph Barbato, French footballer
- 1994 – Song I-han, South Korean singer
- 1995 – Brad Binder, South African motorcycle racer
- 1997 – Sarah Clelland, Scottish footballer
- 1999 – Gregoria Mariska Tunjung, Indonesian badminton player
- 1999 – Changbin, South Korean rapper
- 2001 – Moyuka Uchijima, Japanese tennis player
- 2002 – Marvin Harrison Jr., American football player

== Deaths ==
=== Pre-1600 ===
- 223 – Jia Xu, Chinese politician and strategist (born 147)
- 353 – Magnentius, Roman usurper (born 303)
- 449 – Archbishop Flavian of Constantinople
- 632 – Rusticula, abbess of Arles
- 919 – Dhuka al-Rumi, Abbasid governor of Egypt
- 979 – Gero, Count of Alsleben
- 991 – Byrhtnoth, English soldier (born 956)
- 1044 – Sokkate, king of the Pagan dynasty of Burma (born 1001)
- 1204 – Guttorm of Norway (born 1199)
- 1253 – Clare of Assisi, Italian follower of Francis of Assisi (born 1194)
- 1259 – Möngke Khan, Mongolian emperor (born 1208)
- 1268 – Agnes of Faucigny, Dame ruler of Faucigny, Countess consort of Savoy
- 1332 – Domhnall II, Earl of Mar
- 1332 – Robert II Keith, Marischal of Scotland
- 1332 – Thomas Randolph, 2nd Earl of Moray
- 1332 – Murdoch III, Earl of Menteith
- 1332 – Robert Bruce, Lord of Liddesdale
- 1456 – John Hunyadi, Hungarian general and politician (born 1387)
- 1464 – Nicholas of Cusa, German cardinal and mystic (born 1401)
- 1465 – Kettil Karlsson, regent of Sweden and Bishop of Linköping (born 1433)
- 1486 – William Waynflete, English Lord Chancellor and bishop of Winchester (born c. 1398)
- 1494 – Hans Memling, German-Belgian painter (born 1430)
- 1519 – Johann Tetzel, German preacher (born 1465)
- 1556 – John Bell, English bishop
- 1563 – Bartolomé de Escobedo, Spanish composer and educator (born 1500)
- 1578 – Pedro Nunes, Portuguese mathematician and academic (born 1502)
- 1596 – Hamnet Shakespeare, son of William Shakespeare (born 1585)

=== 1601–1900 ===
- 1614 – Lavinia Fontana, Italian painter (born 1552)
- 1656 – Ottavio Piccolomini, Austrian-Italian field marshal (born 1599)
- 1725 – Prince Vittorio Amedeo Theodore of Savoy (born 1723)
- 1774 – Charles-François Tiphaigne de la Roche, French physician and author (born 1722)
- 1813 – Henry James Pye, English poet and politician (born 1745)
- 1851 – Lorenz Oken, German botanist, biologist, and ornithologist (born 1779)
- 1854 – Macedonio Melloni, Italian physicist and academic (born 1798)
- 1868 – Halfdan Kjerulf, Norwegian pianist and composer (born 1815)
- 1886 – Lydia Koidula, Estonian poet and playwright (born 1843)
- 1890 – John Henry Newman, English cardinal and theologian (born 1801)
- 1892 – Enrico Betti, Italian mathematician and academic (born 1813)

=== 1901–present ===
- 1903 – Eugenio María de Hostos, Puerto Rican-American sociologist, philosopher, and lawyer (born 1839)
- 1908 – Khudiram Bose, Indian Bengali revolutionary (born 1889)
- 1919 – Andrew Carnegie, Scottish-American businessman and philanthropist, founded the Carnegie Steel Company and Carnegie Hall (born 1835)
- 1921 – Mary Sumner, English philanthropist, founded the Mothers' Union (born 1828)
- 1936 – Blas Infante, Spanish historian and politician (born 1885)
- 1937 – Edith Wharton, American novelist and short story writer (born 1862)
- 1939 – Jean Bugatti, German-Italian engineer (born 1909)
- 1939 – Siegfried Flesch, Austrian fencer (born 1872)
- 1945 – Stefan Jaracz, Polish actor and theater producer (born 1883)
- 1953 – Tazio Nuvolari, Italian race car driver and motorcycle racer (born 1892)
- 1956 – Jackson Pollock, American painter (born 1912)
- 1961 – Antanas Škėma, Lithuanian-American author, playwright, actor, and director (born 1910)
- 1963 – Otto Wahle, Austrian-American swimmer and coach (born 1879)
- 1965 – Bill Woodfull, Australian cricketer and educator (born 1897)
- 1969 – Miriam Licette, English soprano and educator (born 1885)
- 1972 – Max Theiler, South African-American virologist and academic, Nobel Prize laureate (born 1899)
- 1974 – Vicente Emilio Sojo, Venezuelan conductor and composer (born 1887)
- 1977 – Frederic Calland Williams, British co-inventor of the Williams-Kilborn tube, used for memory in early computer systems (born 1911)
- 1978 – Berta Ruck, Indian-born Welsh romance novelist (born 1878)
- 1979 – J. G. Farrell, English author (born 1935)
- 1980 – Paul Robert, French lexicographer and publisher (born 1910)
- 1982 – Tom Drake, American actor and singer (born 1918)
- 1984 – Alfred A. Knopf Sr., American publisher, founded Alfred A. Knopf, Inc. (born 1892)
- 1984 – Paul Felix Schmidt, Estonian–American chemist and chess player (born 1916)
- 1986 – János Drapál, Hungarian motorcycle racer (born 1948)
- 1988 – Anne Ramsey, American actress (born 1929)
- 1989 – John Meillon, Australian actor (born 1934)
- 1991 – J. D. McDuffie, American race car driver (born 1938)
- 1994 – Peter Cushing, English actor (born 1913)
- 1995 – Phil Harris, American singer-songwriter and actor (born 1904)
- 1996 – Rafael Kubelík, Czech conductor and composer (born 1914)
- 1996 – Ambrosio Padilla, Filipino basketball player and politician (born 1910)
- 2000 – Jean Papineau-Couture, Canadian composer and academic (born 1916)
- 2001 – Percy Stallard, English cyclist and coach (born 1909)
- 2002 – Galen Rowell, American photographer and mountaineer (born 1940)
- 2003 – Armand Borel, Swiss-American mathematician and academic (born 1923)
- 2003 – Herb Brooks, American ice hockey player and coach (born 1937)
- 2006 – Mike Douglas, American singer and talk show host (born 1920)
- 2008 – George Furth, American actor and playwright (born 1932)
- 2008 – Dursun Karataş, founding leader of the Revolutionary People's Liberation Party–Front (DHKP-C) in Turkey (born 1952)
- 2009 – Eunice Kennedy Shriver, American activist, founded the Special Olympics (born 1921)
- 2010 – James Mourilyan Tanner, British paediatric endocrinologist (born 1920)
- 2012 – Red Bastien, American wrestler, trainer, and promoter (born 1931)
- 2012 – Michael Dokes, American boxer (born 1958)
- 2012 – Lucy Gallardo, Argentinian-Mexican actress and screenwriter (born 1929)
- 2012 – Sid Waddell, British Sports commentator, television presenter, producer, writer & director (born 1940)
- 2013 – Raymond Delisle, French cyclist (born 1943)
- 2013 – Zafar Futehally, Indian ornithologist and author (born 1919)
- 2013 – David Howard, English ballet dancer and educator (born 1937)
- 2014 – Vladimir Beara, Croatian footballer and manager (born 1928)
- 2014 – Raymond Gravel, Canadian priest and politician (born 1952)
- 2014 – Kika Szaszkiewiczowa, Polish author and blogger (born 1917)
- 2014 – Robin Williams, American actor and comedian (born 1951)
- 2014 – Sam Hall, American diver, legislator, and mercenary (born 1937)
- 2015 – Serge Collot, French viola player and educator (born 1923)
- 2015 – Harald Nielsen, Danish footballer and manager (born 1941)
- 2015 – Richard Oriani, Salvadoran-American metallurgist and engineer (born 1920)
- 2017 – Yisrael Kristal, Polish-Israeli supercentenarian; oldest living Holocaust survivor and one of the ten oldest men ever (born 1903)
- 2017 – Segun Bucknor, Nigerian musician and journalist (born 1946)
- 2018 – V S Naipaul, British writer, Nobel Prize laureate (born 1932)
- 2018 – Terry A. Davis, American computer programmer, creator of TempleOS (born 1969)
- 2019 – Sergio Obeso Rivera, Mexican Roman Catholic cardinal (born 1931)
- 2020 – Trini Lopez, American singer and guitarist (born 1937)
- 2020 – Sumner Redstone, American billionaire businessman (born 1923)
- 2022 – Anne Heche, American actress (born 1969)
- 2022 – Hanae Mori, Japanese fashion designer (born 1926)
- 2023 – Mike Ahern, Australian politician, 32nd Premier of Queensland (born 1942)
- 2024 – Ángel Salazar, Cuban-American comedian and actor (born 1956)
- 2024 – Noël Treanor, Irish Roman Catholic prelate (born 1950)
- 2025 – Miguel Uribe Turbay, Colombian precandidate to presidency (born 1986)
- 2025 – Danielle Spencer, American actress (born 1965)

== Holidays and observances ==
- Christian Feast Day:
  - Athracht
  - Clare of Assisi
  - Gaugericus
  - John Henry Newman (Church of England)
  - Blessed John Sandys and Stephen Rowsham
  - Blessed Maurice Tornay
  - Philomena
  - Susanna
  - Taurinus of Évreux
  - Tiburtius and Chromatius
  - August 11 (Eastern Orthodox liturgics)
- Flag Day (Pakistan)
- Independence Day, celebrates the independence of Chad from France in 1960.
- Mountain Day (Japan)
