= Barbara Nawratowicz =

Polish actress and radio journalist (1932–2024)

- Born: 10 November 1932; Poznań, Poland
- Died: 10 May 2024 (aged 91); Switzerland
- Occupations: Actress; Radio journalist

Barbara Nawratowicz-Stuart (10 November 1932 – 10 May 2024) was a Polish actress and radio journalist. She was one of the first stars of Piwnica pod Baranami cabaret and a long-time presenter at Polish section of Radio Free Europe.

== Biography ==
She studied law at Maria Curie-Skłodowska, Jagiellonian and Warsaw University and graduated in 1956. In 1951, during the first year of the college, she was imprisoned by the Ministry of Public Security. She has been kept in a small, dark cell for three months, being multiply interrogated and beaten by the officers. After letting free she has been interrogated several times more.

In 1952 or 1953 she met Piotr Skrzynecki, a student of art history at the Jagiellonian University. This is how she first made a contact with a group of people who few years later started a cabaret Piwnica pod Baranami in the basement of one of town houses at Rynek. Nawratowicz was the star of the cabaret since the very beginning of its existence, she took part in first shows as an actress. Later she became famous for her roles of Cruel Marquise, Intimate Cocotte, Danish Queen and Dutch Stripper. In Piwnica Nawratowicz met Wiesław Dymny, with whom she stayed in a relationship for few years. Kazimierz Kutz recalled that their love was "full of attachment and jealousy".

As an actress she worked at Groteska Theatre in Kraków (1957–1958) and Stefan Żeromski Theatre in Kielce and Radom (1958–1959). After moving to Warsaw she led an audition titled Una on Polish Radio Three. In 1963 she starred along with Andrzej Łapicki in a short film Febliki Tatiany (Tatiana's Weaknesses).

For many years her requests for issuing a passport were rejected. When she finally got a document and travelled to Denmark in 1965 she decided to stay abroad. Jan Nowak-Jeziorański, head of the Polish section of Radio Free Europe, came to Copenhagen to offer Nawratowicz work in the radio. She agreed and on 16 November 1965 she became a member of the crew. She worked as a director of the production, but was also a presenter. She led daily Panorama, weekly Europe for five dollars and wrote satirical occasional programs. For some time she was a main presenter of a popular early-morning musical program Rendez-vous. She became a correspondent in Australia after moving there in 1987.

Barbara Nawratowicz lived in Queensland. She visited Poland once in few years. In 2012 she published a book Kabaret "Piwnica pod Baranami”. Fenomen w kulturze PRL ("Piwnica pod Baranami” Cabaret. Phenomenon in the Culture of Polish People's Republic). She was awarded a Knight's Cross of the Order of Merit of the Republic of Poland. She died by euthanasia in Switzerland on 10 May 2024, at the age of 91.
