= Salt of the Black Earth =

- Directed by: Kazimierz Kutz
- Written by: Kazimierz Kutz
- Starring: Olgierd Łukaszewicz
- Cinematography: Wieslaw Zdort
- Release date: 6 March 1970
- Running time: 99 minutes
- Country: Poland
- Language: Polish

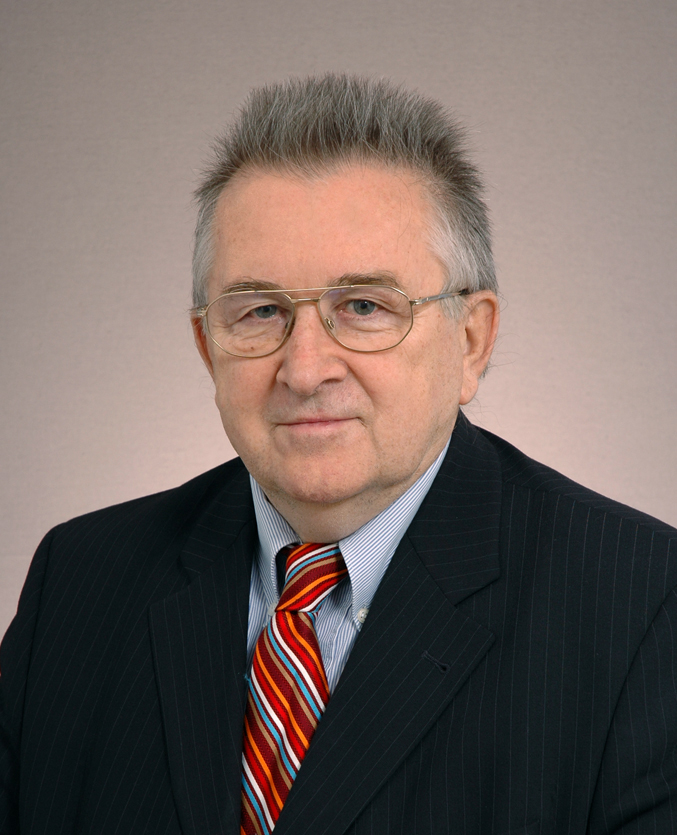
Kazimierz Kutz

Salt of the Black Earth (Polish: Sól ziemi czarnej) is a Polish historical film that takes place during the Second Silesian Uprising. It was directed by Kazimierz Kutz and released in 1970. The film was selected as the Polish entry for the Best Foreign Language Film at the 43rd Academy Awards, but was not accepted as a nominee.

== Plot ==
There are seven Basista brothers. Their father summons them all and tells them all to enlist and fight for Poland, threatening to kill any that betray the cause. They all swear to fight for Poland and free Silesia from the Germans. All civilians are warned beforehand to go for safety, and then they begin the uprising, attacking the town hall. One of the brothers, Cyryl, is killed. Eventually the German soldiers surrender, and the town is taken by the rebels. The populace come out and parade in the town square celebrating liberation.

Gabriel, the youngest, spies on some German soldiers, finding out the password and then ambushing a messenger. He steals the uniform, impersonating a soldier in the town to find the nun he encountered earlier during the assault. He embraces her but she runs away. After seeing some captured rebels being marched off, he finds a room full of officers and lobs a grenade inside. Gabriel goes to rejoin the rebels, only to find them being routed by the much-larger German army. In the course of running from some soldiers, Gabriel finds the nurse again and this time she accepts. Gabriel finally rejoins the rebels, and discovers another brother, Alojz, has been killed.

The fighting continues and Gabriel goes off again, taking out a sniper in a telescope tower. He, along with the audience, view Polish troops raising the Polish flag, as well as the sight of the landscape in all directions. The rebels begin constructing a barricade, when they are delivered a few cases of dynamite. Gabriel returns home to see his father and hide the dynamite. Several Polish soldiers have stolen a cannon and brought it to the barricade, helping the insurgents win the battle.

In the next major battle, barrel bombs and an ambush help them to repel a German attack. However, a counterattack results in close quarters combat. The rebels fight off the attack, but are greatly wearied at this point. The Basista home, which was right behind the partisan’s trench, has been all but obliterated in the attack. During the next assault, the Basista house is destroyed, their father killed by cannon fire. The fighting becomes increasingly brutal, with many hand-to-hand fights between men.

The rebels, in a last ditch effort, blow up what remains of the Basista home as a diversion to allow them to escape across the river. Having regrouped in a warehouse in town, the German army has surrounded their position and they realize they have failed. Their leader Erwin informs them of this fact and tells them to write their wills. Gabriel asks Erwin why Poland has not helped them, and he does not know how to answer him. The rebels make a run for it through the town, but many of them are cut down, and the others captured. The remaining rebels are executed, The film ends with four women bringing a dying Gabriel across to Poland, where he is reunited with Erwin and his remaining brothers. His fate is uncertain.

== Cast ==
- Olgierd Łukaszewicz as Gabriel Basista
- Jan Englert as Erwin Maliniok
- Jerzy Bińczycki as Bernard Basista
- Jerzy Cnota as Euzebin Basista
- Wiesław Dymny as Franek Basista
- Bernard Krawczyk as Dominik Basista
- Andrzej Wilk as Alojz Basista
- Antoni Zwyrtek as Father Basista
- Izabella Kozlowska as Nurse
- Jerzy Lukaszewicz as Cyryl Basista
- Daniel Olbrychski as Lt. Stefan Sowinski
- Tadeusz Madeja as Wiktor
- Henryk Maruszczyk as Emil

== See also ==
- List of submissions to the 43rd Academy Awards for Best Foreign Language Film
- List of Polish submissions for the Academy Award for Best Foreign Language Film
