= Janina Garycka =

Polish set designer (1920–1997)

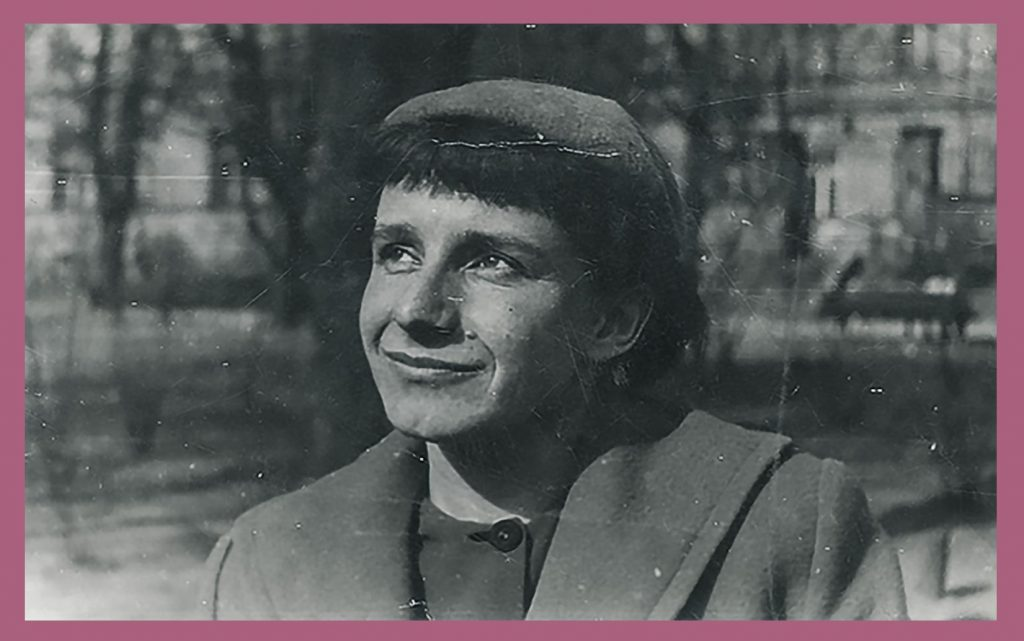
- Janina Garycka
- Born: 26 November 1920; Kraków
- Died: 5 December 1997 (aged 77); Kraków
- Known for: cabaret, painting
- Movement: Piwnica pod Baranami

Janina Garycka (26 November 1920 – 5 December 1997) was a set designer and painter, artist of Piwnica pod Baranami and life partner of Piotr Skrzynecki.

== Biography ==
She was the daughter of Franciszek Garycki and Zofia née Pick. She spent her childhood years in Kraków's Podgórze district. She graduated from a girls' high school in Katowice. She passed matura exam in 1938.

Also in 1938, she began studying Polish at the Jagiellonian University. Her studies were interrupted by the outbreak of World War II. She continued her studies during the Nazi occupation at clandestine university classes, which she also co-organized. At the same time, she studied drawing. She was active in the resistance movement, in the Żel-bet formation of the Home Army, as a liaison with the rank of second lieutenant.

After the war, she studied painting at the Academy of Fine Arts in Kraków and completed her studies in Polish; based on her master's thesis Techniki opisu przyrody u polskich poetów baroku, written under the supervision of Kazimierz Wyka and Stanisław Pigoń. Upon that thesis she obtained a doctorate.

She became a member of the Association of Polish Artists and Designers. In 1945 she started working as a set designer at the Rhapsodic Theatre in Kraków.

She painted miniature portraits.

She was buried at the Podgórski Cemetery.

== Documentary film ==
In 2003, a documentary film W jednym. O przyjaźni, miłości i śmierci Janiny Garyckiej directed by Antoni Krauze premiered.

== Bibliography ==
- Łagocki, Zbigniew (1968). Piwnica. Kraków: Polskie Wydawnictwo Muzyczne. p. 75.
- Zbigniew Łagocki, Maria Pyrlik, Leszek Wójtowicz (2003). Dom na Groblach. Rzecz o Janinie Garyckiej, Piotrze Skrzyneckim i Piwnicy pod Baranami. Warszawa: Wydawnictwa Artystyczne i Filmowe.
