= Jan Kanty Pawluśkiewicz =

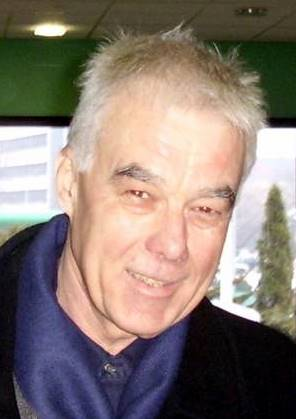

Background information
- Born: 13 October 1942 (age 83); Nowy Targ, Poland
- Origin: Poland
- Occupation: composer
- Years active: 1967 -
- Website: www.pawluskiewicz.art.pl

Jan Kanty Pawluśkiewicz (born 13 October 1942) is a Polish composer and musician, known for his collaboration with Marek Grechuta and his compositions for stage and film.

== Biography ==
Born in the town of Nowy Targ, he studied music and architecture at the Polytechnic University in Kraków. Here he met Marek Grechuta, with whom he founded the student cabaret Anawa in 1967. In the 1970s he started to write songs for the cabaret Piwnica pod Baranami.

He also arranged and composed for stage productions at the Stary Teatr and Theater Scena STU in Kraków, the National Theatre and the Teatr Powszechny in Warsaw. He co-authored the musical adaption of Stanisław Witkiewicz's Szalona Lokomotywa (The Crazy Locomotive) together with K. Jasiński and Marek Grechuta in 1977. In 1980 he co-authored the opera Kur zapiał (A rooster crowed) and in 1991 the opera Opera żebracza (Beggar's Opera). He is also known for his compositions for short and feature films by directors such as Krzysztof Kieślowski, Feliks Falk, Agnieszka Holland and Márta Mészáros. Since 2000 he participated in the concert "Ellington po krakowsku" ("Ellington Kraków way") where notable composers of the Piwnica pod Baranami were playing their interpretations of Duke Ellington's music. This concert has been conducted by Aleksander Glondys.

In 2005 he received Laurel of Kraków of the 21st century.

== Books ==
- Księgi nieczyste. Austeria. 2023. ISBN 9788378666684. Co-authored with Zygmunt Konieczny and Jakub Baran. Illustrated by Sebastian Kudas.
