= Dorota Terakowska =

Polish writer and journalist

- Born: 30 August 1938; Kraków, Second Polish Republic
- Died: 4 January 2004 (aged 65); Kraków, Poland
- Education: Jagiellonian University
- Occupations: Novelist, journalist
- Writing career
- Notable work: Córka czarownic

Barbara Rozalia Terakowska (August 30, 1938 – January 4, 2004), known as Dorota Terakowska, was a Polish writer and journalist best known for her fantasy books for children and young adults, two of which became required reading at Polish schools. Her novel Córka czarownic was included in the IBBY Honour List and received the Polish IBBY section literary award; it also became her most translated work. Before focusing on literature in 1980s, Terakowska wrote for various newspapers and magazines such as Gazeta Krakowska and Przekrój.

== Early life and education ==
Terakowska was born on 30 August 1938, in Kraków. She was expelled from her secondary school and continued her education in a secondary school for adults. She began to work early and also quickly started taking part in the cultural life of Kraków, in May 1956 she joined the youth organisational committee at the Piwnica pod Baranami, where she bartended and also sang two songs in shows. In 1965, she completed a sociology degree at the Jagiellonian University.

== Career ==
In 1962, Terakowska debuted with a short story called Opowiadanie pod tytułem: Opowiadanie, which was published in Przekrój. In 1969, after working for a couple years as a sociologist, she started writing for the Gazeta Krakowska daily until the period of martial law in Poland. In 1969–1981 she was a member of the Polish United Workers' Party. For years, Terakowska wrote articles, reviews, reportage and interviews for Przekrój, Zdanie and Zeszyty Prasoznawcze. In the late 1970s, she received numerous awards in reportage competitions. During martial law, she made a living by knitting sweaters.

In 1990, Terakowska was among the founders of the Czas Krakowski, to which she also contributed as a journalist. A year later, she resumed working at the Gazeta Krakowska. In the 1990s, she also worked, among others, as an editor for comics and resumed collaborating with Przekrój. A collection of her Przekrój columns from that period were later published as Muzeum Rzeczy Nieistniejących (2006).

Around 1979, Terakowska started writing for children and young adults, but most of her works were not approved for publication by the Censorship in Communist Poland and started to be published almost a decade later. She began writing for children because of the political situation and also because she was dismissed from the editorial staff. Although the first novel she wrote was Babci Brygidy szalona podróż po Krakowie aimed at young adults, it was the 1983 collection of her journalistic text, Próba generalna, which became her first published book. Around that time, Terakowska started to focus almost fully on her literary work, writing for younger and older audiences alike. Her books were steeped in fantasy. Suffering, death and child's loneliness were frequent motifs in her writing; she wrote about weighty topics with empathy and understanding. Her ultimate novel, Ono, was based on an idea of her daughter, Małgorzata Szumowska.

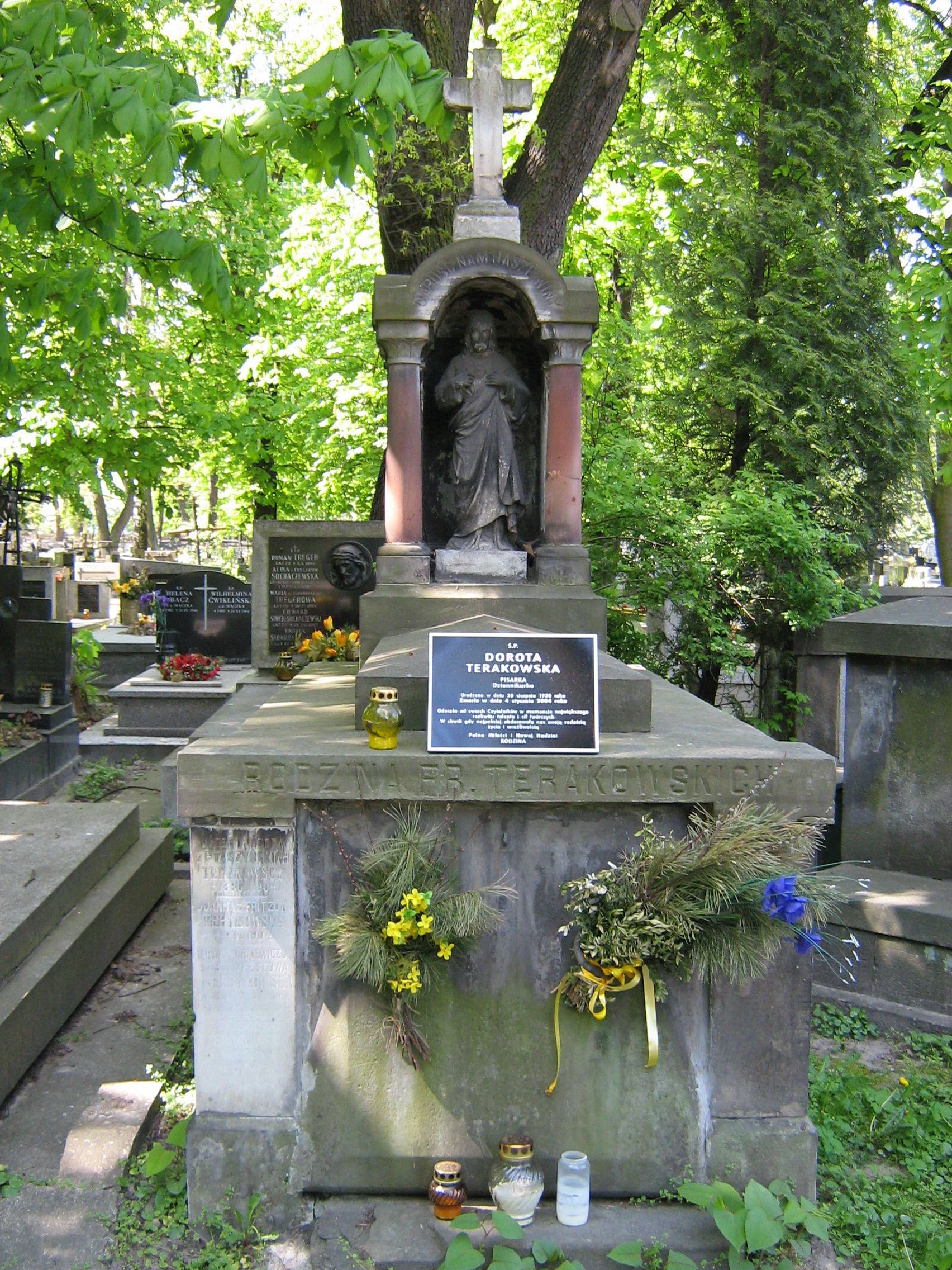
Grave of Terakowska at the Rakowicki Cemetery

Terakowska received a number of awards for her works for children and young adults. In 1987, she won a prize in a competition ran by the children's magazine Miś. She also received three literary awards from the Polish section of the International Board on Books for Young People (IBBY), for Córka czarownic (1992), Samotność bogów (1998) and Tam gdzie spadają Anioły (1999). Córka czarownic was also included in the IBBY Honour List. In 1998, Terakowska was nominated for the Paszport Polityki award for her life's work. Two of her books were included in the official required reading lists for Polish schools. The city of Kraków named a park after Terakowska and her husband, Maciej Szumowski.

Terakowska died on 4 January 2004, in Kraków, and is buried at the Rakowicki Cemetery.

Terakowska's popularity did not wane after her death; in the decade which followed, there were almost 400 thousand copies of her books sold in Poland. Her most translated work is the fantasy novel Córka czarownic, which has been translated into German, Czech, Lithuanian, Serbian, Slovak, Slovene and Italian.

== Private life ==
Terakowska was married twice. First, to the jazz musician Andrzej Nowak, then to the journalist and filmmaker Maciej Szumowski. She had two daughters, the journalist Katarzyna T. Nowak and film director Małgorzata Szumowska. Nowak wrote about her mother in Moja mama czarownica. Opowieść o Dorocie Terakowskiej (2005), while Szumowska based a character on Terakowska in 33 Scenes from Life.

== Published works ==
=== Novels ===
- Guma do żucia, 1986
- Babci Brygidy szalona podróż po Krakowie, 1987
- Władca Lewawu, 1989
- Córka czarownic, 1991
- Lustro pana Grymsa, 1995
- Samotność Bogów. Baśń nie nowa i nie stara, 1998
- Tam, gdzie spadają Anioły, 1999
- W krainie kota, 1999
- Poczwarka, 2001
- Ono, 2003
- Dzień i noc czarownicy, 2003

=== Non-fiction ===
- Próba generalna, 1983
- Dobry adres to człowiek, 2004
- Muzeum Rzeczy Nieistniejących, 2006
