= Wiesław Dymny =

Polish actor, writer and artist (1936–1978)

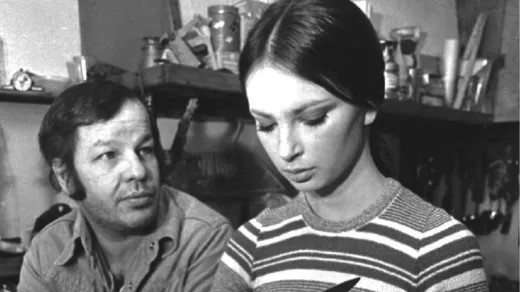
- Portrait of Dymny (left) with Anna Dymna, c. 1972. From the PAP archive
- Born: 25 February 1936; Połoneczka, Nowogródek Voivodeship, Second Polish Republic
- Died: 12 February 1978 (aged 41); Kraków. Kraków Voivodeship, Polish People's Republic
- Resting place: Salwator Cemetery
- Education: Academy of Fine Arts
- Occupations: Painter, actor, writer

Wiesław Dymny (25 February 1936 – 12 February 1978) was a painter, drawer, set designer, sculptor, actor, screenwriter, writer, poet and satirist, active in the Piwnica pod Baranami cabaret.

== Biography ==
The son of teachers Wiktor Dymny and Janina, Dymny attended the High School of the Friends of Children Society (currently the S. Żeromski High School No. 3) in Bielsko-Biała. In 1953 he passed his matura and began studying painting at the Academy of Fine Arts, where his professors included Jan Świderski (painter), Wacław Taranczewski, Zdzisław Przebindowski.

Dymny wrote texts for Studencki Teatr Satyryków and Teatr 38. In 1961, together with Barbara Nawratowicz, he founded the Remiza cabaret, which operated for about six months at Piwnica Pod Jaszczurami. In 1964 he founded the beat group Szwagry in Kraków, and until 1969 he was its artistic and literary director and served as a master of ceremonies. He authored c. 300 song lyrics, including Black Angels with music by Zygmunt Konieczny, performed by Ewa Demarczyk, awarded at the 1st National Song Festival in Opole. He published his poems in, among others, the weekly Szpilki (1970–1978, with breaks). In 1977, an apartment fire destroyed several of his drawings and texts.

Dymny suffered from alcohol addiction. His first wife was Teresa Hrynkiewicz. He was partner of Barbara Nawratowicz and, later, husband of Anna Dymna née Dziadyk. He was buried at the Salwator Cemetery.

== Filmography ==
=== Actor ===
- Rancho Texas (1958) as Góralczyk
- Drugi człowiek (1961) as himself; a member of the cabaret Piwnica pod Baranami; he is not in the credits
- Ktokolwiek wie... (1966) as “Sobiekról”
- Chudy i inni (1966) as Paweł “Mały”
- Wszystko na sprzedaż (1968) as Wiesio, on duty on the set of a historical film
- Sól ziemi czarnej (1969) as Franek Basista, brother of Gabriel
- Doktor Ewa (TV series, 1970), as a worker, episode 1
- Przez dziewięć mostów (TV film, 1971) as neighbor
- 150 na godzinę (1971) as performing in Kossówka
- Przeprowadzka (1972) as porter
- Przyjęcie na dziesięć osób plus trzy (TV film, 1973) as worker Frączak
- Nagrody i odznaczenia (1973) as Captain Bakun, wounded in hospital
- Nie ma mocnych (1974) as drummer at Ania and Zenek's wedding; he is not in the credits
- Karuzela (TV film, 1974)
- Bielszy niż śnieg (TV film, 1975)
- Pasja (1977) as drunk peasant
- Wesela nie będzie (1978)
- Pejzaż horyzontalny (1978)

=== Screenwriter ===
- Chudy i inni (1966)
- Słońce wschodzi raz na dzień (1967)
- Pięć i pół bladego Józka (1971)
- Koty budujące machiny latające (1975)

== Books ==
- Opowiadania zwykłe. Warszawa: Wydawnictwo Iskry. 1963.

== Accolades ==
- Kościelski Award (1965)

== Commemoration ==
In 1987, the Wiesław Dymny Cultural Foundation was established in Montreal.

== Bibliography ==
- Zawojski, Piotr (1994). "Wiesław Dymny: wszystko ma dobry koniec, czyli śmierć". In T. Miczka, A. Madej (ed.). Syndrom konformizmu?: kino polskie lat sześćdziesiątych (PDF). Katowice: Wydawnictwo Uniwersytetu Śląskiego. pp. 195–219. Archived from the original (PDF) on 31 May 2023.
- Wąs, Monika (2013). Wiesław Dymny. Kraków: Wydawnictwo Petrus.
- Wąs, Monika (2016). Dymny. Życie z diabłami i aniołami. Kraków: Społeczny Instytut Wydawniczy „Znak”.
- "Wiesław Dymny". Elewator. Kwartalnik Literacko-kulturalny. 26. 2018. ISSN 2299-5692.
- Delfina Jałowik, ed. (2020). Wiesław Dymny. Jestem ranny człowiek. Pisarz, aktor, malarz. Kraków: Muzeum Sztuki Współczesnej w Krakowie MOCAK.
