= Stanisław Pigoń =

Polish literary historian (1885–1968)

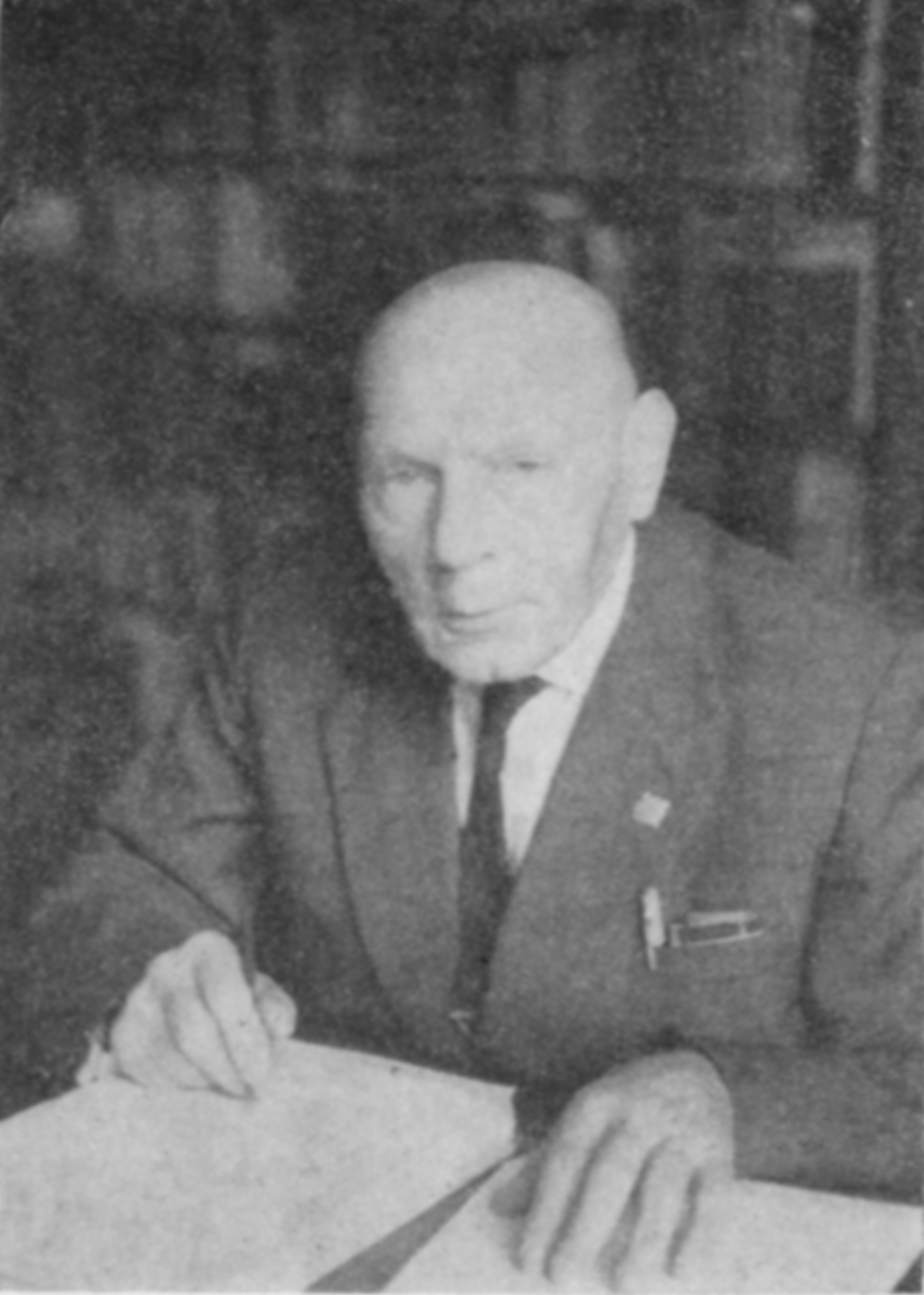
- Born: 27 September 1885; Kombornia
- Died: 18 December 1968 (aged 83); Kraków
- Citizenship: Polish
- Occupation: literary historian

Stanisław Pigoń (27 September 1885 – 18 December 1968) was a literary historian, rector of the Vilnius University from 1927 until 1928.

== Biography ==
He came from a peasant family, the son of Jan Pigoń and Katarzyna née Rymarz. From 1898 until 1906 he attended gymnasium in Jasło. In 1911 he obtained doctorate at the Jagiellonian University upon dissertation O «Księgach narodu i pielgrzymstwa polskiego» Adama Mickiewicza supervised by Ignacy Chrzanowski.

In his research, he focused on the literature of the Romantic period (especially the biography and work of Adam Mickiewicz) and Young Poland, as well as folk culture; in parallel, he undertook editorial work, in later years directing critical editions of works by, among others, Mickiewicz, Stefan Żeromski, Aleksander Fredro, and Władysław Orkan.

In 1929 he was elected a corresponding member of the Polish Academy of Arts and Sciences (he was elected its active member in 1939). After the outbreak of World War II and Nazi invasion of Poland, on 6 November 1939, he was imprisoned along with other Jagiellonian University professors by the Gestapo and deported to the Sachsenhausen concentration camp. He was released in February 1940.

At the Jagiellonian University he headed the Department (Katedra) of the History of Polish Literature from 1945 until 1953, and in the years 1953–1960 he headed the Department (Zakład) of Old Polish Literature. In the years 1945–1950 and 1958–1960 he was the chairman of the Adam Mickiewicz Literary Society in Kraków. From 1945 to 1949, he co-directed the Institute of Folk Literature with Józef Spytkowski. In 1951, he was elected a full member of the Warsaw Scientific Society, and in 1952, a titular member of the Polish Academy of Sciences (PAN; he was elected its full member in 1957). From 1953 he was a member of the Program Council of Wydawnictwo Literackie in Kraków.

In 1964 he signed Letter of 34. He was the father of Andrzej Pigoń and Krzysztof Pigoń. Janina Garycka was among his students. His remainings were buried at the Salwator Cemetery.

== Books ==
- O "Księgach narodu i pielgrzymstwa polskiego" A. Mickiewicza. Kraków. 1911.
- Z epoki Mickiewicza. Studia i szkice. Lwów. 1922.
- Głosy sprzed wieku. Szkice z dziejów procesu filareckiego. Wilno. 1924.
- Ze studiów nad tekstem "Pana Tadeusza". Trzy notatki. Kraków. 1928.
- Z dawnego Wilna. Szkice obyczajowe i literackie. Wilno. 1929.
- Do źródeł "Dziadów" kowieńsko-wileńskich. Wilno. 1930.
- O brązach, brązownikach i brązoburcy. Warszawa. 1930.
- Adam Mickiewicz w kole Sprawy Bożej. Warszawa. 1932.
- "Pan Tadeusz". Wzrost-Wielkość-Sława. Warszawa. 1934.
- Na wyżynach romantyzmu. Studia historyczno-literackie. Kraków. 1936.
- Z dziejów teatru szkolnego w Polsce w XVII. Lwów. 1938.
- Zręby nowej Polski w publicystyce Wielkiej Emigracji. Warszawa. 1938.
- Na drogach i manowcach kultury ludowej. Lwów. 1939.
- Zarys nowszej literatury ludowej. Kraków. 1946.
- Stanisław (1885–1968), Pigoń (1947). Z Komborni w świat. Kraków.

== Accolades ==
- Commander's Cross of Polonia Restituta "on the 10th anniversary of the People's Republic of Poland for outstanding achievements in the field of science." (16 July 1954)
- State Award of the 1st degree for his scientific activity (1955)
- Order of the Banner of Labour, 1st class "for his services in preparing the National Edition of the works of Adam Mickiewicz." (25 April 1956)
- Alfred Jurzykowski Foundation Prize (1965)
- Honorary degree of the University of Chicago (1968)

== Commemoration ==
In 2001, the Rector and Senate of the Jagiellonian University established the Stanisław Pigoń Scholarship Fund, supporting students from rural areas and small towns facing financial hardship. In 2009 a street in Rzeszów was named after him.

== Bibliography ==
- Nowak, Z. J. (1981). "Pigoń Stanisław". Polski Słownik Biograficzny. Vol. XXVI/1 and 2, issue 108 and 109. Wrocław.
- Wokół Stanisława Pigonia. Nad warsztatem naukowym i literackim Uczonego. Jolanta Barylanka (ed.). Rzeszów: Krajowa Agencja Wydawnicza. 1983. ISBN 83-03-00098-5.
- Przybyła, Zbigniew (1995). ""Stanisław Pigoń: szkice do portretu", Czesław Kłak, Rzeszów, 1993, recenzja" (PDF). Pamiętnik Literacki. 86/2: 199–201. Archived from the original (PDF) on 26 December 2025.
- Ziejka, Franciszek (2010). "Profesor z Komborni". Stanisław Pigoń w czterdziestą rocznicę śmierci. Krzysztof Fiołek (ed.). Kraków: Wydawnictwo Uniwersytetu Jagiellońskiego. Archived from the original on 26 January 2025.
- Kłak, Czesław (2013). Pigoń. Wydawnictwo Uniwersytetu Rzeszowskiego.
