= Tadeusz Kwinta =

Polish actor (born 1938)

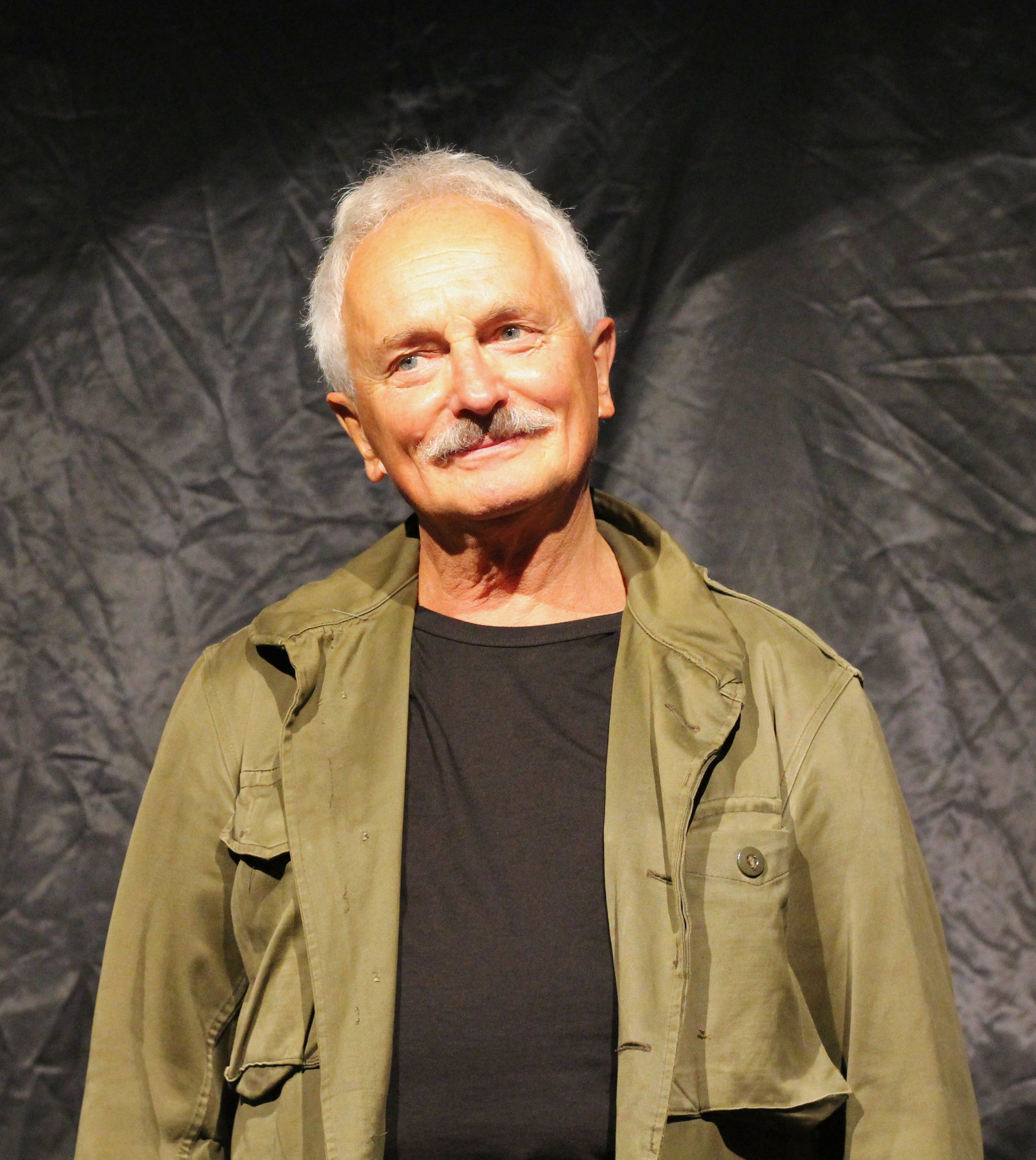
- Born: 18 October 1938 (age 87); Kraków
- Citizenship: Polish
- Occupation: actor

Tadeusz Kwinta (born 18 October 1938) is a Polish actor.

== Biography ==
He started acting when he was 13 in the young artists' theatre created by Maria Biliżanka. He was an artist of Piwnica pod Baranami. After graduating from Ludwik Solski Academy for the Dramatic Arts in 1960 he began work in Ludowy Theatre (1960–1967, later 1974–1979, 1981–1986). Kwinta was also an actor of Silesian Theatre (1967–1969), Helena Modrzejewska Theatre (1969–1971), Bagatela Theatre (1971–74, as an artistic director 1986–1990) and Juliusz Słowacki Theatre (1990–2004).

In 1976 he was awarded with a Silver Cross of Merit.
