= Piwnica pod Baranami =

Literary cabaret in Kraków, Poland

Coordinates: 50°03′42″N 19°56′08″E

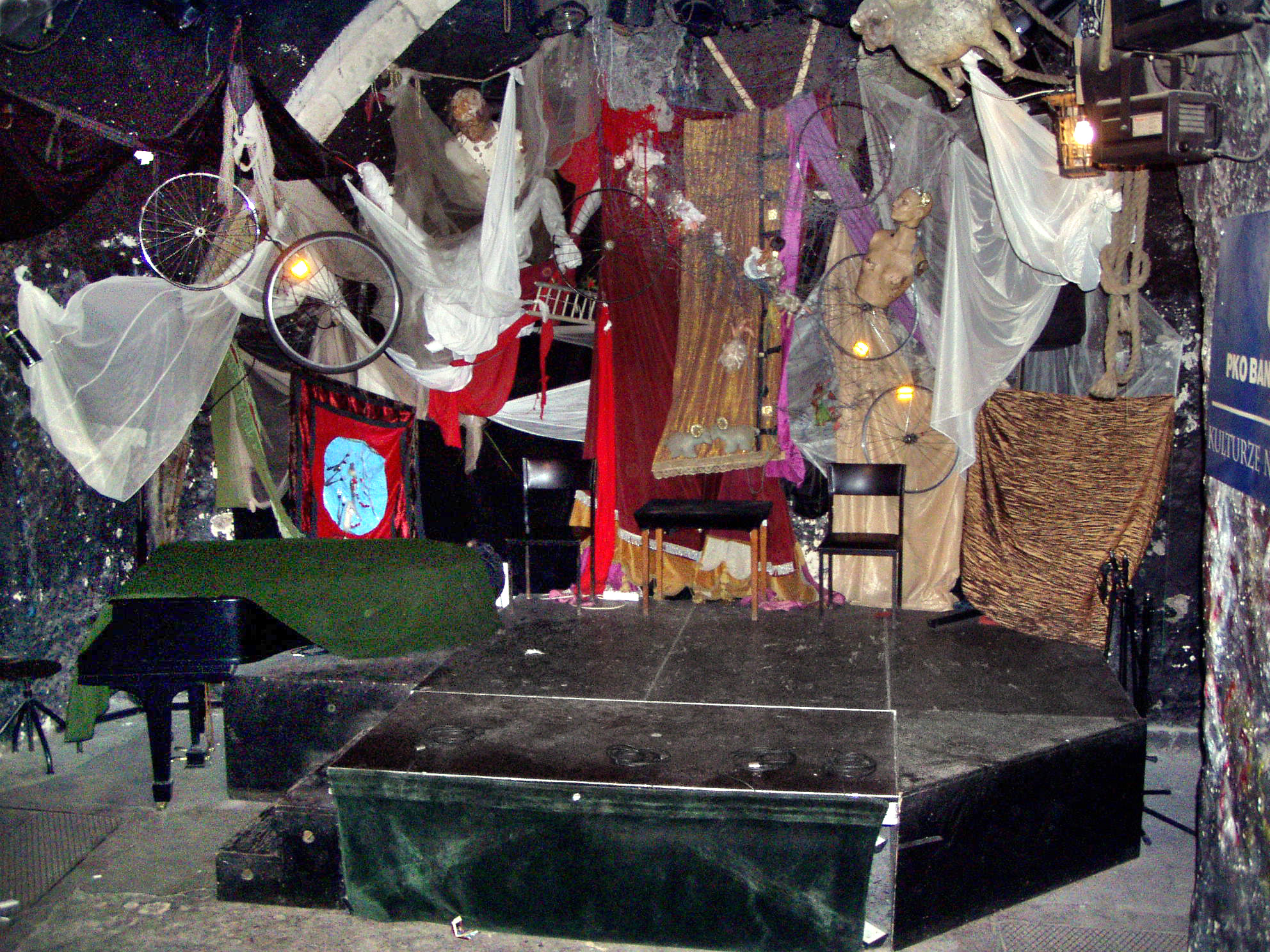
The stage of the Piwnica pod baranami

The Piwnica pod Baranami (English: The Basement, or the Cellar under the Rams) is a Polish literary cabaret located in Kraków, Poland. For over thirty years, in the People's Republic of Poland, Piwnica pod Baranami served as the most renowned political cabaret in the country, until the end of (and beyond) the communist era. Created by Piotr Skrzynecki in 1956, the cabaret continues its activities, contrary to rumours that it has been closed after the death of its founder in 1997. It resides at its original location in the medieval Old Town district, at the Main Market Square (next to Vis-á-vis café).

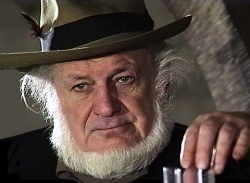
Piotr Skrzynecki

At first, the facility was a meeting place for Kraków students. It was a club for creative youth (Klub Młodzieży Twórczej), part of the Old Town Community Centre in the Palace under the Rams (Pałac Pod Baranami). The stage was formed by young artists of many different genres: writers, musicians, visual artists and actors, as well as their friends and faithful audiences. After nearly fifty years Piwnica became a legend of local eccentricity, and the style of the Piwnica cabaret entered the colloquial language as the "underground (piwnica) style" of performance. An account of the cabaret performance at Piwnica is given in a 2010 book A Long, Long Time Ago & Essentially True by Brigid Pasulka.

Piwnica's influence has reached beyond the art; it has been described thus: "It was much more than a cabaret. It was a breath of freedom and of ironic distance to the reality which surrounded us."

== Artists of Piwnica pod Baranami ==
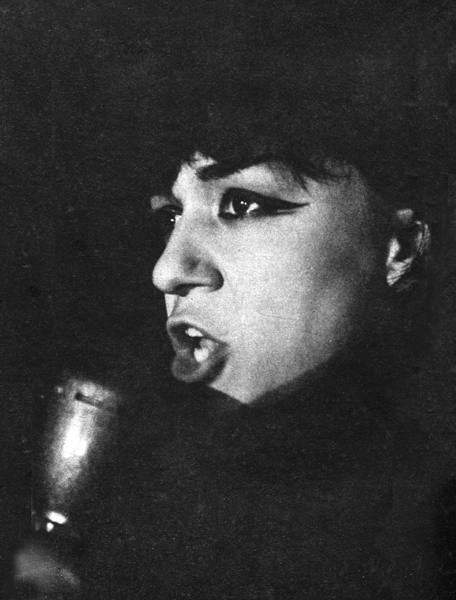
Demarczyk

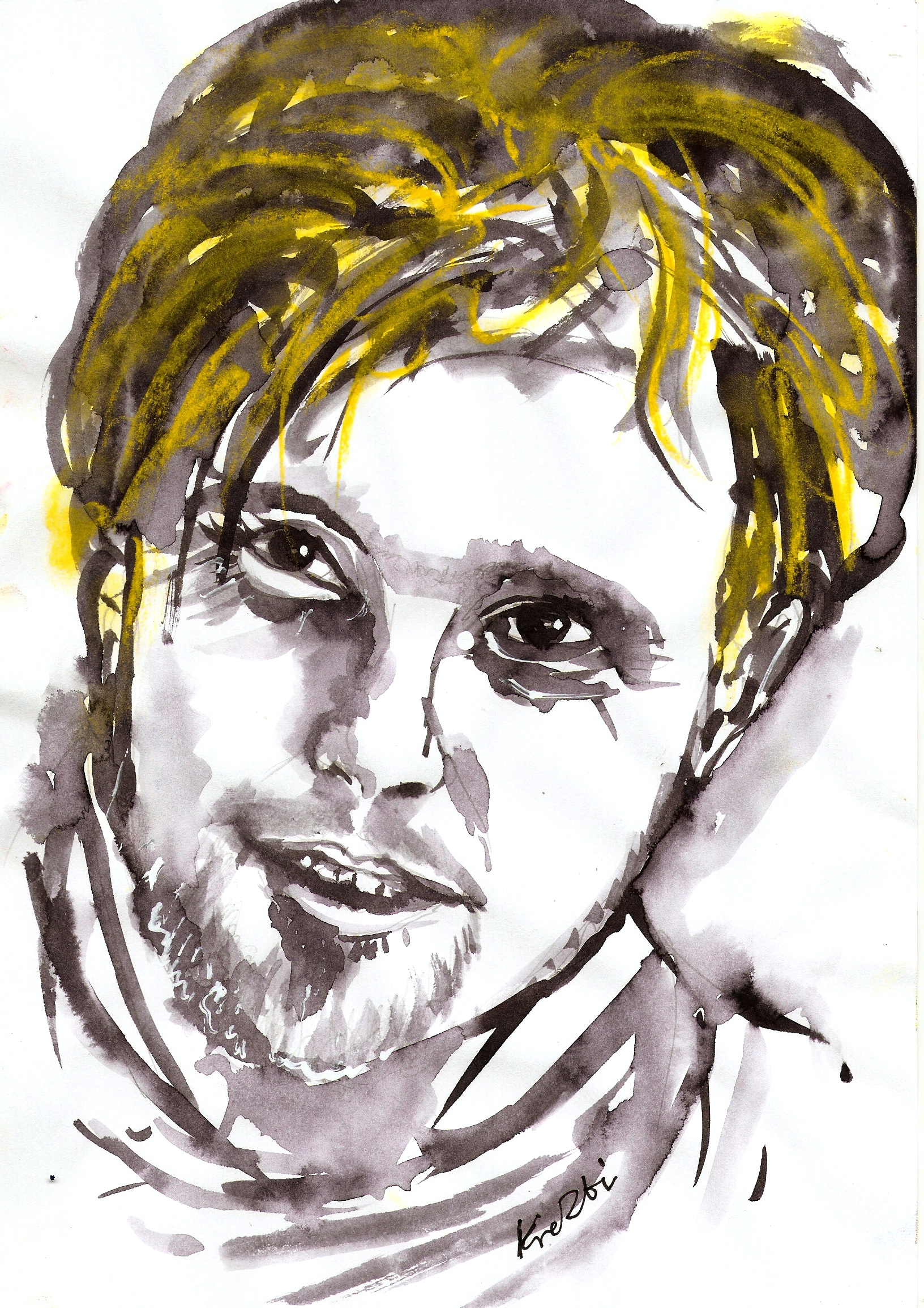
Komeda

- Bronisław Chromy
- Ewa Demarczyk
- Leszek Długosz
- Stefan Dymiter
- Anna Dymna
- Wiesław Dymny
- Janina Garycka
- Jan Güntner
- Tamara Kalinowska
- Krzysztof Komeda
- Zygmunt Konieczny
- Andrzej Kurylewicz
- Tadeusz Kwinta

- Kika Lelicińska
- Krzysztof Litwin
- Stanisław Radwan
- Barbara Nawratowicz
- Jan Nowicki
- Maria Nowotarska
- Mirosław Obłoński
- Joanna Olczak-Ronikier
- Agnieszka Osiecka
- Krzysztof Penderecki
- Joanna Plewińska

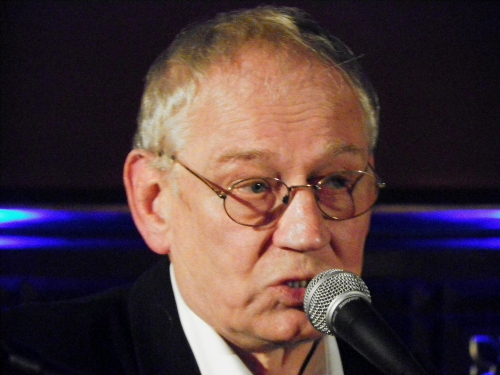
Długosz

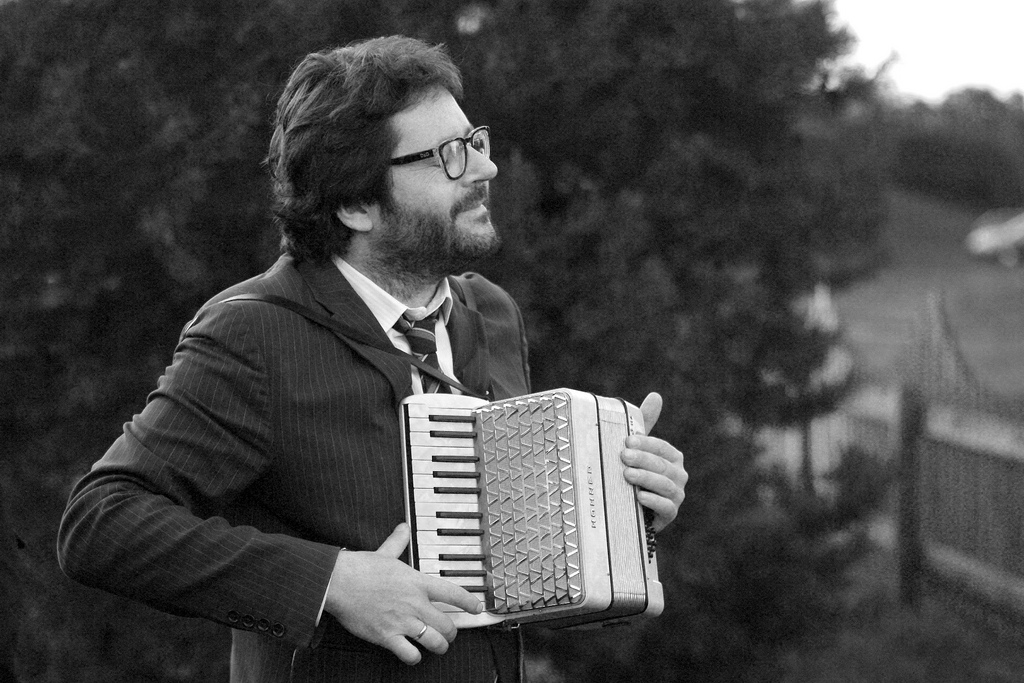
Turnau

- Mieczysław Święcicki
- Kika Szaszkiewiczowa
- Jerzy Turowicz
- Jerzy Vetulani
- Andrzej Wajda
- Kazimierz Wiśniak
- Dorota Terakowska
- Grzegorz Turnau
- Leszek Wójtowicz
- Krystyna Zachwatowicz
- Andrzej Zarycki
- Dorota Ślęzak
- Ewa Wnuk- Krzyżanowska

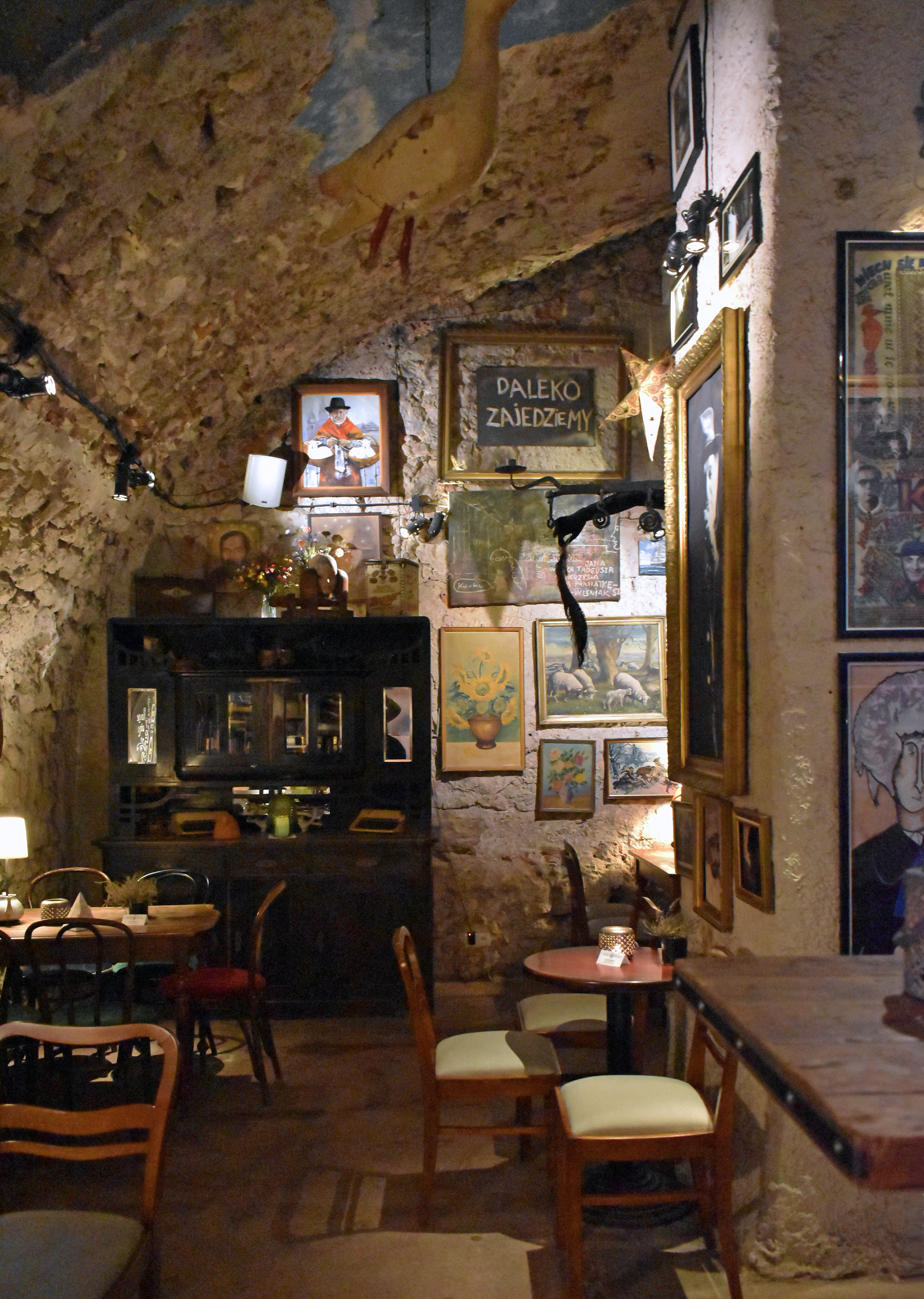
Medieval cellars of the palace

== Bibliography ==
- Joanna Olczak-Ronikier: Piwnica pod Baranami, Wydawnictwo Tenten, Warsaw 1994, reissue 2002 by Prószyński i S-ka, ISBN 83-7337-267-9
- Joanna Olczak-Ronikier: Piotr, Wydawnictwo Literackie 1998, ISBN 83-08-02861-6
- Jolanta Drużyńska, Stanisław M. Jankowski: Kolacja z konfidentem. Piwnica pod Baranami w dokumentach Służby Bezpieczeństwa, Kraków 2006
- Wacław Krupiński: Głowy piwniczne, Wydawnictwo Literackie 2007, ISBN 978-83-08-04103-1
- Barbara Nawratowicz: Piwnica pod Baranami. Początki i rozwój (1956-1963), Petrus, 2010
- Janusz R. Kowalczyk: Wracając do moich Baranów, Wydawnictwo Trio, Warsaw 2012, ISBN 978-83-7436-291-7
