= Grzegorz Turnau =

Polish composer, pianist, poet and singer

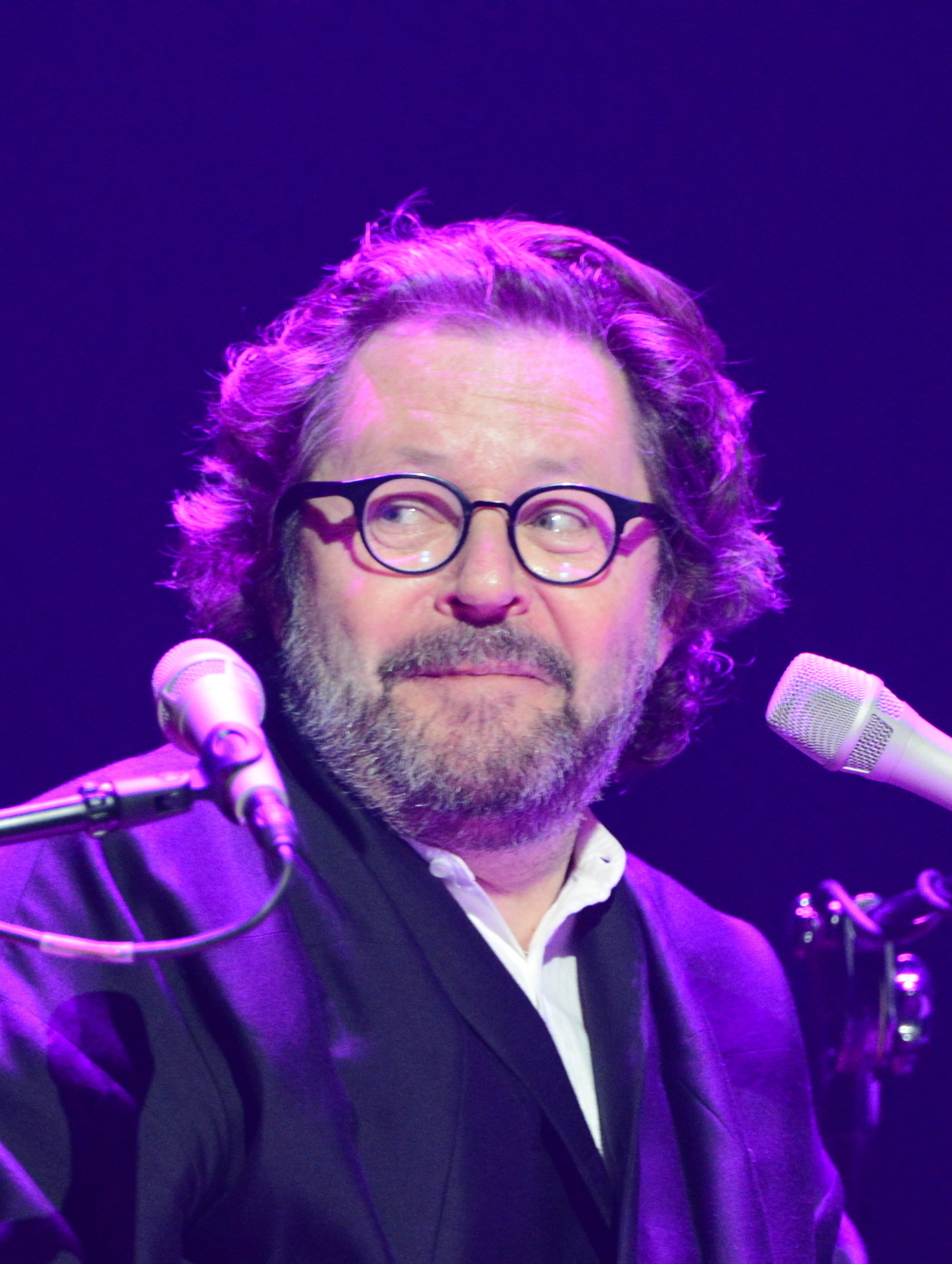

Background information
- Born: 31 July 1967 (age 58); Kraków, Poland
- Genres: Sung poetry
- Occupations: Musician, songwriter, producer
- Instruments: Piano, vocals
- Labels: Pomaton EMI, EMI Music Poland, Mystic Production
- Website: www.grzegorzturnau.pl

Grzegorz Jerzy Turnau (born 31 July 1967) is a Polish composer, pianist, poet and singer. He has released eleven albums to date, including one (Cafe Sułtan) made up of his own versions of songs by Jeremi Przybora and Jerzy Wasowski, and most have enjoyed considerable chart success.

His characteristic style consists of strong, clear lyrics and music composed in special keys and harmonies, using instruments such as the piano (played by himself), saxophone, violin and various horns. Influenced by such artists as Marek Grechuta and Jan Kanty Pawluśkiewicz, his music style falls within the broad genre of sung poetry.

== Biography ==
He was born on 31 July 1967 in Kraków, Poland. At age seventeen he won First Prize (Grand Prix) at The Student Song Festival in Kraków in 1984. He went on to join the Piwnica pod Baranami Cabaret, composing such hits as "Znów wędrujemy", and released his first album, Naprawdę nie dzieje się nic ("Really, nothing is happening") in 1991.

He did participate in the Aleksander Glondys's "Ellington po krakowsku" ("Ellington, Kraków-Style"), a concert based upon idea of notable composers of Piwnica pod Baranami playing their interpretations of Duke's music. Other participants include Pawluśkiewicz, Zbigniew Raj and several other musicians.

== Discography ==
=== Solo albums ===
Title	Album details	Peak chart positions	Sales	Certifications
Title	Album details	POL	Sales	Certifications
Naprawdę nie dzieje się nic	Released: 1991; Label: Pomaton EMI; Formats: CD, digital download	–	POL: 100,000+	POL: Gold
Pod światło	Released: 1993; Label: Pomaton EMI; Formats: CD	–	POL: 100,000+	POL: Gold
To tu, to tam	Released: 9 October 1995; Label: Pomaton EMI; Formats: CD, CS, digital download	–	POL: 400,000+	POL: 2× Platinum
Tutaj jestem	Released: 28 April 1997; Label: Pomaton EMI; Formats: CD, CS, digital download	–	POL: 100,000+	POL: Gold
Księżyc w misce	Released: 30 November 1998; Label: Pomaton EMI; Formats: CD, digital download	–		
Ultima	Released: 5 June 1999; Label: Pomaton EMI; Formats: CD	–	POL: 50,000	POL: Gold
Nawet	Released: 12 November 2002; Label: EMI Music Poland; Formats: CD, digital download	4		
Cafe Sułtan	Released: 4 October 2004; Label: EMI Music Poland; Formats: CD, digital download	4		
11:11	Released: 21 November 2005; Label: EMI Music Poland; Formats: CD, digital download	4	POL: 15,000+	POL: Gold
Fabryka klamek	Released: 2 November 2010; Label: Mystic Production; Formats: CD, LP, digital download	3	POL: 15,000+	POL: Gold
7 widoków w drodze do Krakowa	Released: 28 November 2014; Label: Mystic Production; Formats: CD + LP	19		
L	Released: 13 October 2017; Label: Agora S.A.; Format: CD + DVD	11		
Szósta godzina	Released: 10 October 2025; Label: Mystic Production			
"—" denotes a recording that did not chart or was not released in that territory.

=== Compilation albums ===
Title	Album details	Peak chart positions	Sales	Certifications
Title	Album details	POL	Sales	Certifications
Kawałek cienia	Released: December 2000; Label: Pomaton EMI; Formats: CD	–		
Do zobaczenia	Released: 16 March 2009; Label: EMI Music Poland; Formats: CD, digital download	6	POL: 15,000+	POL: Gold
"—" denotes a recording that did not chart or was not released in that territory.

=== Cover albums ===
Title	Album details	Peak chart positions	Sales	Certifications
Title	Album details	POL	Sales	Certifications
Historia pewnej podróży	Released: 27 November 2006; Label: EMI Music Poland; Formats: CD, digital download	2	POL: 30,000+	POL: Platinum
Bedford School	Released: 9 November 2018; Label: Mystic Production; Formats: CD	20		
"—" denotes a recording that did not chart or was not released in that territory.

=== Collaborative albums ===
Title	Album details	Peak chart positions	Sales	Certifications
Title	Album details	POL	Sales	Certifications
Witaj Gwiazdo Złota (with Ewa Małas-Godlewska)	Released: 1998; Label: EMI Music Poland; Formats: CD, digital download	—	POL: 100,000+	POL: Platinum
Kołysanki – utulanki (with Magda Umer)	Released: 12 June 2003; Label: Fokus; Formats: CD, digital download	32		
Kruchy świat, kruche szkło (with Wojciech Malajkat)	Released: 4 August 2007; Label: Stowarzyszenie Przyjaciół Piwnicy pod Baranami "Klub 40"; Formats: CD	—		
Pasjans na dwóch (with Andrzej Sikorowski)	Released: 27 August 2007; Label: Music Collection Agency; Formats: CD	21		
Astrid Lindgren (with Ewa Bem)	Released: 28 listopada 2008; Label: EMI Music Poland; Formats: CD	—		
"—" denotes a recording that did not chart or was not released in that territory.

=== Live albums ===
Title	Album details	Sales	Certifications
Turnau w Trójce	Released: 1994; Label: Pomaton EMI; Formats: CD, digital download	POL: 100,000+	POL: Gold
Och! Turnau Och-Teatr 18 V 2011	Released: 17 October 2011; Label: Mystic Production; Formats: CD, DVD, LP, Blu-ray		
