= Kika Szaszkiewiczowa =

Polish cabaret performer and writer (1917–2014)

Irena "Kika" Szaszkiewiczowa
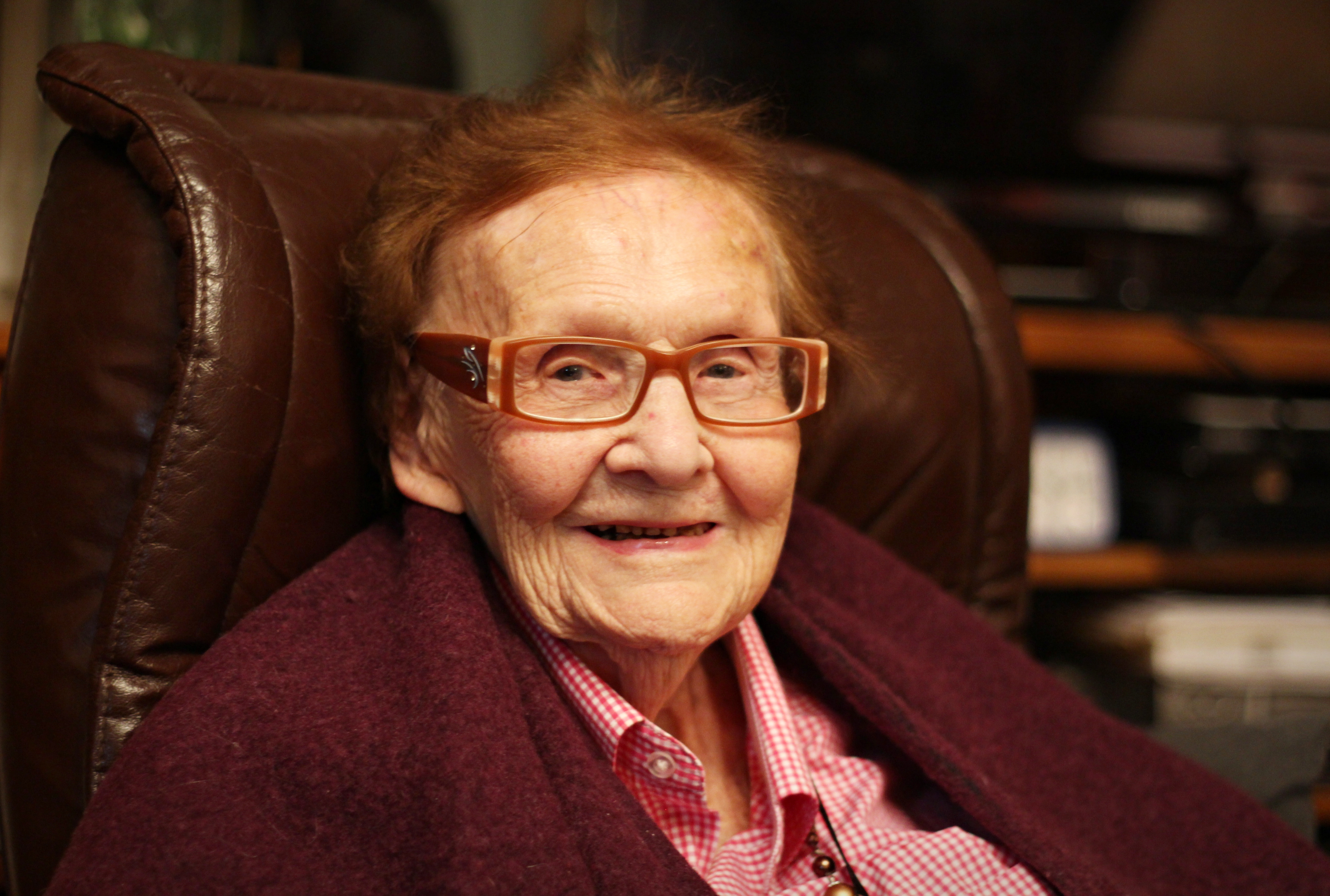
- Born: Irena Jarochowska; 4 March 1917; Kraków, Austria-Hungary
- Died: 11 August 2014 (aged 97); Kraków, Poland
- Occupations: Artist, writer, blogger
- Website: Szaszkiewiczowa blog

Irena "Kika" Szaszkiewiczowa (née Jarochowska; 4 March 1917 – 11 August 2014) was a Polish artist, writer and blogger.

== Biography ==
Irena Szaszkiewiczowa was the sister of Maria Jarochowska, a writer and communist activist, and Konstanty Jarochowski, a photographer. During World War II, she was a member of Armia Krajowa.

She was a performer of the Piwnica pod Baranami. Her fictional adventures were described in the comics called Szaszkiewiczowa, czyli Ksylolit w jej życiu, published in Przekrój since 1958.

She lived in Norway from 1969 to 2007. In 2011, she published her memoir titled Podwójne życie Szaszkiewiczowej (The Double Life of Szaszkiewiczowa). In 2013, at the age of 96, she started to run a blog Moje pierwsze 100 lat (My First 100 Years). At the time, she was the oldest blogger in Poland.

On 9 August 2014, two days before her death, she was awarded with Officer's Cross of Polonia Restituta by the president of Poland. She received the order from Lesser Poland Voivode Jerzy Miller during a ceremony at her apartment in Kraków.

== Bibliography ==
- Irena Kika Szaszkiewiczowa: Podwójne życie Szaszkiewiczowej. Wydawnictwo Literackie, Kraków 2011; ISBN 978-83-08-04790-3.
