= Leszek Długosz =

Polish actor, poet, writer and composer (1941–2024)

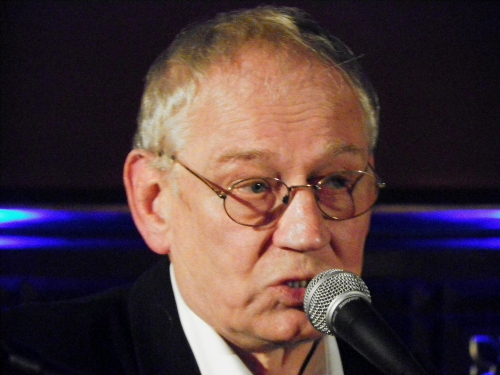
Leszek Długosz

Leszek Marek Długosz (18 June 1941 – 23 March 2024) was a Polish actor, poet, writer and composer. For many years he was a member of cabaret "Piwnica pod Baranami", one of the most famous cabarets during the times of People's Republic of Poland.

== Biography ==
Leszek Długosz was born in Zaklików on 18 June 1941. He studied at the Jagiellonian University (Uniwersytet Jagielloński) in Kraków (major in Polish studies) and Polish Higher School of Theatre (Polska Wyższa Szkoła Teatralna) (major in acting). He studied music since childhood and started his public performances at the Jagiellonian University's Theatre Hefajstos. In 1963 he won the Student's Song Competition (Festiwal Piosenki Studenckiej) in Kraków, and a year later he joined the cabaret "Piwnica Pod Baranami". His debut as a poet took place in 1973 with the publication of Lekcje Rytmiki. In 1978 he began a career of solo performances. He published many poetry and lyrics books, and issued several CDs. He was the leader of an informal Kraków Poetic Club. He performed around the world.

Długosz died on 23 March 2024, at the age of 82.

== Honours ==
- Silver Medal for Merit to Culture – Gloria Artis (2006)
- Commander's Cross of the Order of Polonia Restituta (2016)
