= Anna Dymna =

Polish actress (born 1951)

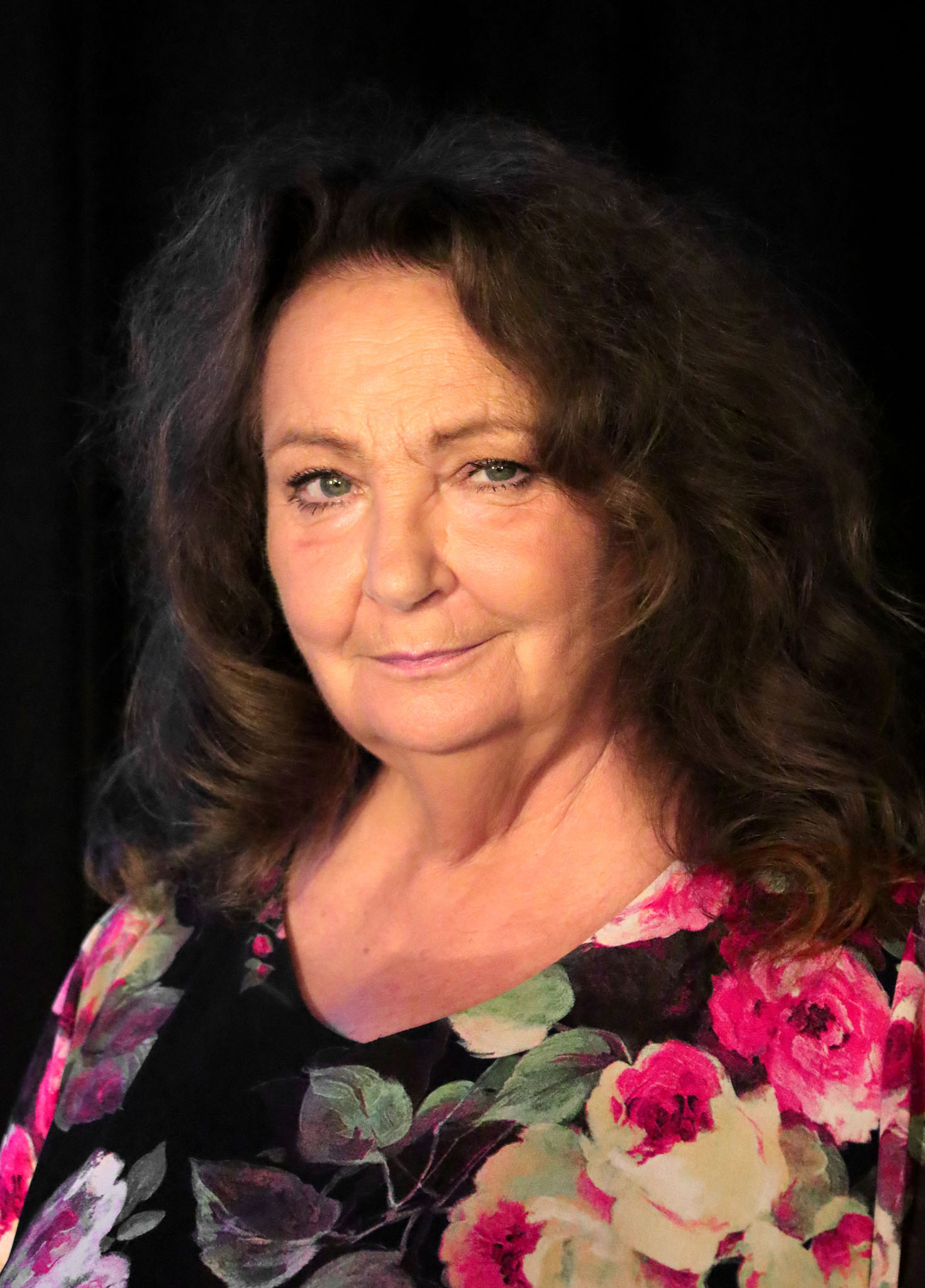
- Portrait of Dymna, 2024
- Born: 20 July 1951 (age 74); Legnica, Republic of Poland
- Occupation: Actress
- Years active: 1969–present
- Spouses: Wiesław Dymny (m. 1971; died 1978) Zbigniew Szota (m. 1983; div. 1989): Krzysztof Orzechowski
- Children: 1

Signature
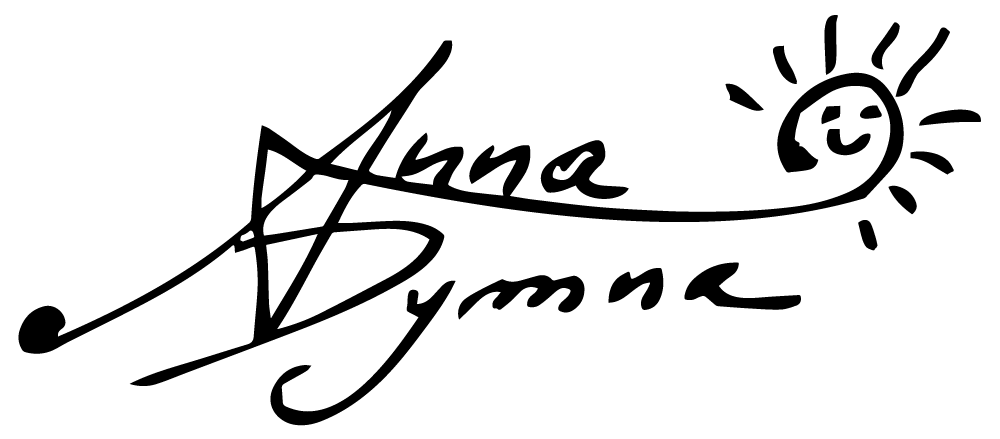

Anna Dymna [ˈanna ˈdɨmna] (née Dziadyk [ˈd͡ʑadɨk]; born 20 July 1951) is a Polish TV, film and theatre actress, foundress of a charity foundation Mimo Wszystko (Against the Odds).

== Career ==
Anna Dymna intended to study psychology before she decided to take an entrance examination for the Ludwik Solski Academy for the Dramatic Arts in Cracow. While still a student, Dymna performed at the Juliusz Słowacki Theatre in Cracow. In 1969 she played the role of Isia and Chochoł in the performances of Stanisław Wyspiański's Wesele. Dymna also made her film debut when she was still a student, playing a role in Henryk Kluba's Pięć i pół bladego Józka (1971) but, because that film was actually never shown on screens, her first official film role is considered to be the role of Gabrysia in the same year's Szerokiej drogi, kochanie directed by Andrzej J. Piotrowski. Dymna became popular with television viewers owing to her role of Klarysa in a TV series Janosik (1973). The later role of Ania Pawlak in Polish cult comedy films Nie ma mocnych and Kochaj, albo rzuć turned out to be even more successful. She also appeared in a number of Jerzy Hoffman's melodrama films.

Dymna was employed by the National Helena Modrzejewska Old Theatre in Cracow immediately after her graduation in 1973 and has performed on its stage since then. Her major roles included characters of beautiful women, e.g. Kora in Noc listopadowa ("November night"); Anna in Warszawianka ("The Varsovian lady"); and Ania in The Cherry Orchard by Anton Chekhov. Later she also performed in Thomas Mann's The Magic Mountain; Joyce's Exiles; and The Master and Margarita by Mikhail Bulgakov.

Dymna has played about 250 theatrical and film roles. She has been esteemed for her talent and looks which "emanated with freshness, naturalness, girlishness and charm". Her photographs decorated covers of magazines, but her beauty became, in a way, an obstacle for portrayals of more mature characters. Such a possibility emerged in the second half of the 1980s when she experienced physical change related with motherhood.

In 2002 Dymna initiated the Cracow Poetry Salon, which has become a weekly reading of poetry by most distinguished actors and poets. The Salon takes place each Sunday at Juliusz Słowacki Theatre but it already has its separate branches in some other cities of Poland, e.g. in Częstochowa, Gdańsk, Opole and Tarnów. The Cracow Poetry Salon was granted the Nike Award in 2003 for "the most interesting cultural activity in the region".

== Charity work ==
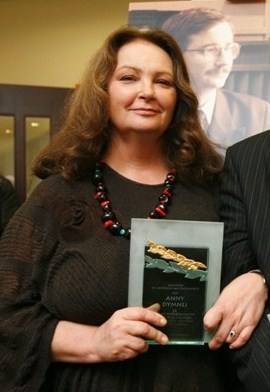
Dymna in 2007

Dymna has been involved in charity for many years. She actively participated in the activities of the Civic Committee for the Salvation of Krakow, being the voice of those who wanted to preserve the historic appearance of the city. In 1999 she started co-operation with the St. Brother Albert Foundation which organizes charity performances with therapists and their disabled charges. Two years later she originated the "Albertiana" National Festival of Theatre and Musical Works of Disabled Persons.

Finally, in the year 2003 Dymna established her own charity foundation, called Mimo Wszystko ("Against the Odds") which aims at improvement in the living conditions of the poor and disabled people. This aim is to be achieved by gradual diminishment of mental barriers that exist between the disabled and the healthy citizens of society, as well as by equalising opportunities for them.

Dymna is also the co-author of a TV program Spotkajmy się ("Let's meet"), in which she talks with her ill and disabled guests about "love, acceptance, loneliness, happiness, faith and hope". The program is produced in an intimate and peaceful atmosphere.

She also supported actions focused on help for the refugees from Kosovo.

== Personal life ==
Dymna was married to artist Wiesław Dymny from 1971 until his death in 1978. She often emphasized the impact her first husband had on her, owing to his colourful personality. On the 20th anniversary of his death, she asked Big Cyc, the favourite band of her son, to write three songs on the basis of Dymny's texts.

She remarried in 1983 to Zbigniew Szota and they had a son, Michał (born 1985). They divorced in 1989. Later on she got married for the third time to her current husband, Krzysztof Orzechowski, an actor and theatre director.

== Awards ==
Anna Dymna has received many important awards for her artistic achievements, including the Golden Mask (1996, 1999, 2000); the Golden Screen in 1984; and the Golden Lions in 1994. The President of the Republic of Poland awarded her with the Officer's Cross of the Order of Polonia Restituta in 2004. Disabled children granted her the Order of the Smile for her charity involvement in the same year.

Other noticeable awards for Anna Dymna include:

- Silver Cross of Merit (1989)
- Golden Duck (1993)
- Aleksandra Zelwerowicz Award (1994)
- Brother Albert’s Medal (2000)
- Superwiktor (2004)
- Friend of Integration (2004)
- Ecce Homo Order (2005)
- Polish Doctors' Society Medal of Merit (2006)
- St. George's Medal (2006)
- The Great Orchestra of Christmas Charity Foundation Medal (2007)
- Woman of the Year 2006 of the Twój Styl magazine (2007)
- Benemerenti Diploma (2007)
- Super Lodołamacz (2007)

== Bibliography ==
- Baniewicz, Elżbieta (2001), Anna Dymna, Ona to ja, Warsaw: Grupa Wydawnicza Bertelsmann Media, ISBN 978-83-7227-990-3
