= Piotr Skrzynecki =

Polish choreographer, director and cabaret impresario

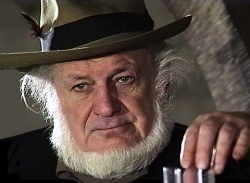
- Piotr Skrzynecki, wearing his signature hat, which was buried with him.
- Born: Piotr Cezary Skrzynecki; 12 September 1930; Warsaw
- Died: 27 April 1997 (aged 66); Kraków
- Known for: theater, cabaret, film
- Movement: Piwnica pod Baranami

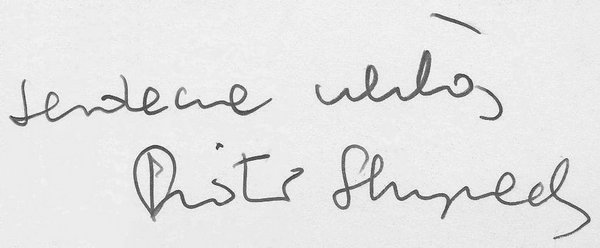
Signature (1980).

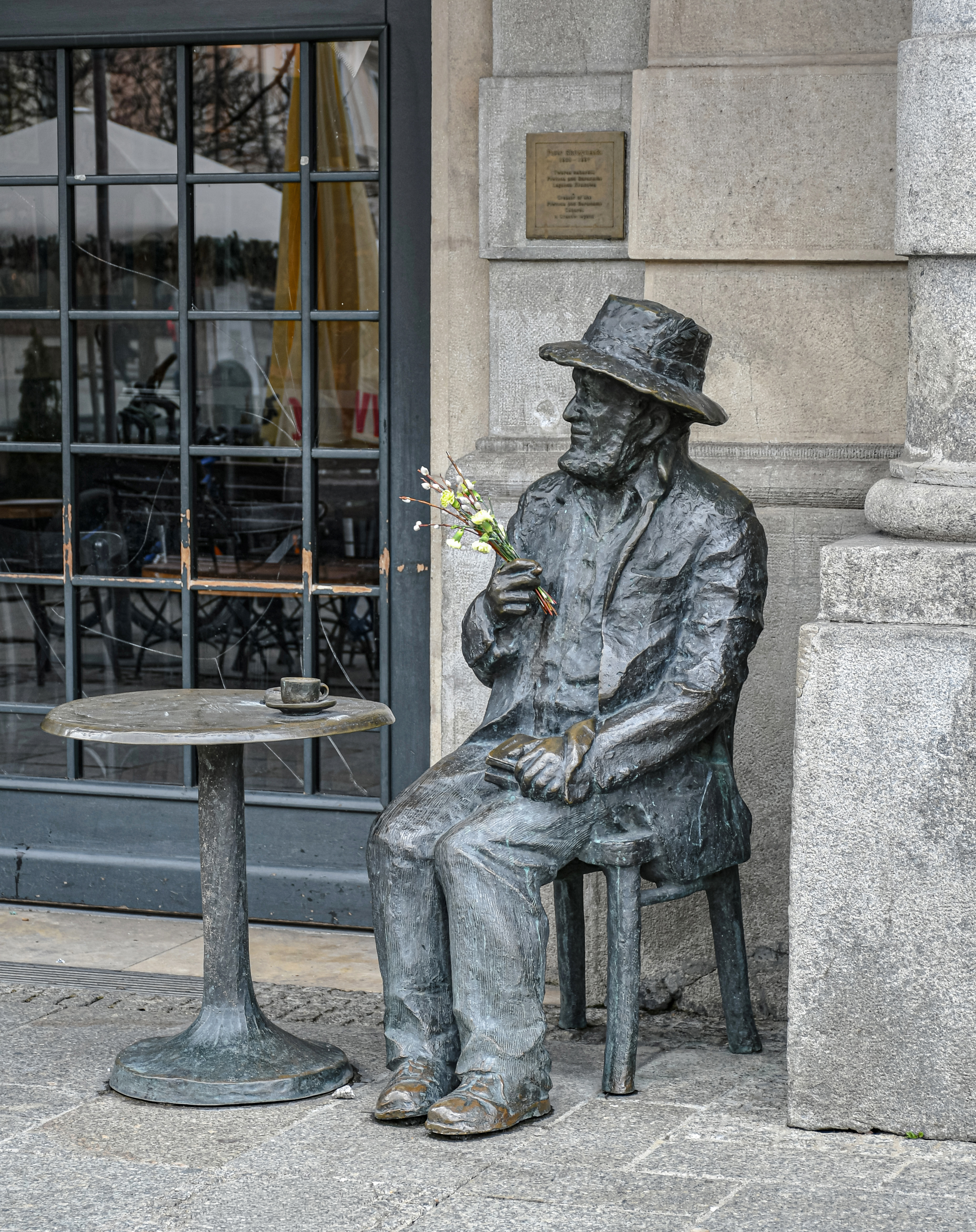
Statue close to cafe "Vis-à-Vis" 29 Main Market Square Kraków.

Piotr Cezary Skrzynecki (12 September 1930 in Warsaw – 27 April 1997 in Kraków) was a Polish choreographer, director and cabaret impresario, known for his involvement with the cabaret Piwnica pod Baranami (The Cellar under the Rams), of which he was the founder.

== Biography ==
Skrzynecki was born on 12 September 1930 in Warsaw. He was the son of a Pole Marian Skrzynecki, lieutenant colonel in the Polish Army and a Jewess Magdalena Endelman. His father died during the Soviet invasion of Poland, when he was the commander of the 7-th Lubelski Cavalry Regiment. After World War II his family moved to Łódź. There he attended a theater school associated with the National Film School in Łódź. Next he moved to Kraków where he began studies in history of art at the Jagiellonian University. There, at the age of 26, in 1956 he organized student club which, in time, became Piwnica pod Baranami, with its first performance in December that year.

Until his death, he would be the leading member of Piwnica. It became the most popular intellectual cabaret in postwar Poland, and one of the symbols of Kraków. Although it was not primarily a political humor group, coming in the wake of the liberalization of Polish October, the Piwnica cabaret became famous for its satirical criticism of the People's Republic of Poland communist regime. Polish magazine Przekrój wrote that "For 41 years [Skrzynecki] and his cabaret persuaded us that, despite the system, we had come into this world for happiness and joy.".

His attitude to authority was rebellious through his life; he often taunted censors present in the audience. During the martial law in Poland of 1981 he was accused by the authorities of inciting a riot by his simple presence; in response, he set the official document accusing him of the charges to music, as he later did with the one lifting the charges. Similarly, he had a disdainful attitude towards money; there was a time he was homeless and slept on a park bench.

In addition to cabaret activity, Skrzynecki organized various events, fresh air performances, and famous parties, gathering top Polish artists and actors.

He played in several movies: Kalosze szczęścia, Aria dla atlety, Sukcesja, Epitafium dla Barbary Radziwiłłówny, Przewodnik, Piwnica pod Baranami Piotra Skrzyneckiego, Rozmowy z Piotrem. He wrote the script for the Panowie na złotych sznurkach movie, which he directed.

He lived with Janina Garycka, who was his life-partner and literary supervisor of Piwnica pod Baranami.

In his final years he has been suffering from cancer. He died on 27 April 1997 in Kraków.

== Awards and recognition ==
He has been described as a "larger-than-life figure", "already a legend in his own lifetime", widely respected and even adored in Poland. His funeral attracted large crowds and many public figures.

A documentary movie (Przewodnik by Tomasz Zygadło, 1984) and a 4-episode TV series (Piwnica pod Baranami Piotra Skrzyneckiego by Antoni Krauze, 2001) are dedicated to him. In 1998, Joanna Olczak-Ronikier published his biography, entitled Piotr .

Three monuments to Skrzynecki exist, out of which the most prominent is a life-sized statue of him on the Market Square in Kraków.

He received several awards through his life. He has been awarded the honorary citizenship of the city of Kraków. Since his death, his birthday and nameday are celebrated with "Koncerty dla Piotra S." (Concerts for Piotr S.) events.
