= Włodzimierz Korcz =

Polish composer, pianist, and producer (born 1943)

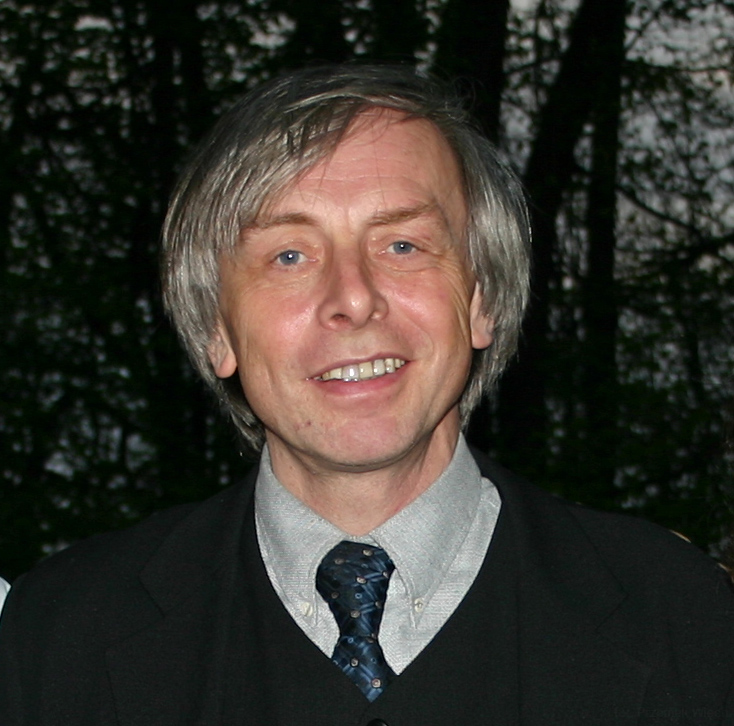
- Włodzimierz Korcz in 2005

Background information
- Born: 13 November 1943 (age 82); Łódź, Poland
- Genres: Sung poetry, oratorios
- Occupations: Composer, pianist
- Instrument: Piano
- Years active: 1965–present
- Website: www.bibliotekapiosenki.pl/Korcz_Wlodzimierz

Włodzimierz Korcz (born 13 November 1943 in Łódź) is a Polish composer, pianist, music producer and author of many popular songs. He graduated from the Academy of Music in Łódź and debuted in 1965. In 1968–1970 Korcz worked as music editor for Polskie Radio in Łódź. In 1974–1977 he was the music director at Teatr na Targówku in Warsaw.

Korcz composes film and theatre music, and performs at radio and TV concerts. He was a co-producer of shows such as Mazurskie Biesiady Kabaretowe (Masurian Cabaret Feasts) and Lidzbarskie Wieczory Humoru i Satyry (Lidzbark's Satirical Evenings). He received recognition at many festivals in Poland and abroad, including: at the National Festival of Polish Song in Opole, as well as the Rostock, Vitebsk and Bratislava music festivals. He also worked with several literary cabarets across Poland: such as Pod Egidą, Kabaret TEY, Kabaret Olgi Lipińskiej, as well as the TV-made Polskie Zoo, Kraj się śmieje and others.

== Popular works ==
Korcz is the co-author of one of the best-known Polish protest songs written in 1976 together with the cabaret artist, singer-songwriter Jan Pietrzak. It is called Żeby Polska była Polską (Let Poland be Poland, or – less commonly, For Poland to be Poland), an informal anthem of the Solidarity period in the People's Republic of Poland. It was an emblem of the political opposition to the totalitarian regime from the June 1976 protests against the Soviet-style communism imposed in Poland, all the way to the collapse of the Warsaw Pact in the 1990s. The song gained utmost popularity during the emergence of Solidarity in 1980, often played from the workers radio stations and internal speakers at factories. It was widely known among the members of Solidarity (NSZZ Solidarność). In June 1981 Pietrzak performed it at the 19th National Festival of Polish Song in Opole, winning first-prize awards for the "hit song of the season" and "the audience choice." One of the largest public performances took place in Warsaw, at the crossroads of major streets (Aleje Jerozolimskie and Marszałkowska Street).

As noted by Józef Tischner, For Poland to be Poland resonated with the millions of people under the communist rule as the expression of freedom. Eventually however it lost popularity, due to critical voices among some Solidarity advisors. The song is still performed today, often to a standing audience. Its lyrics inspired President Ronald Reagan to name his own speech after it: Let Poland be Poland. It was also quoted by the Queen of the United Kingdom during her speech in the Polish parliament.

Korcz wrote gospel music for the annual concerts called Hymny. Artyści polscy Janowi Pawłowi II w hołdzie (Oratorios. Polish artists paying homage to John Paul II) along with a slew of other composers including Bartosz Chajdecki; televised in 2010 (as Golgota Polska) and released on record. The best known among his church music, is the oratorio Woła nas Pan (Our Lord is calling) with lyrics by playwright Ernest Bryll. Korcz is married to actress Elżbieta Starostecka with two children: Kamil Jerzy (b. 1971) and Anna Maria (b. 1982).
