= Andrzej Zaorski =

Polish actor (1942–2021)

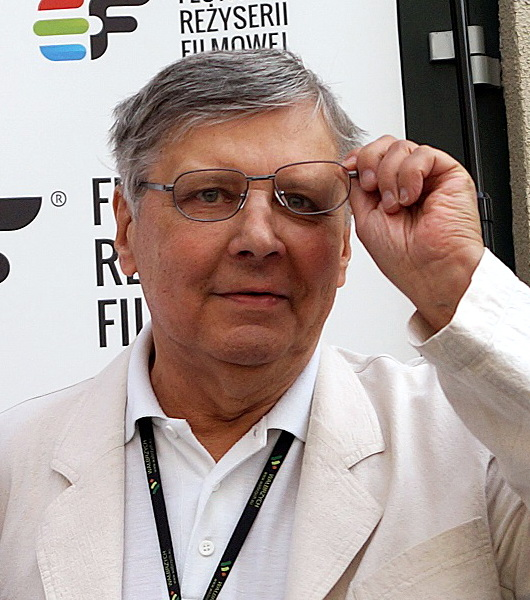
Zaorski in 2018

Andrzej Adam Zaorski (17 December 1942 – 31 October 2021) was a Polish actor and cabaret artist, appearing in television, film and theater, as well as on the radio. He was the son of Tadeusz Zaorski, the brother of film director Janusz Zaorski, and the father-in-law of satyrist Andrzej Butruk.

== Biography ==
Zaorski was born in Piaski, Poland. He graduated from the Aleksander Zelwerowicz National Academy of Dramatic Art in Warsaw in 1964 and made his debut at the theatre on 31 January 1965. He performed at the Warsaw Contemporary Theatre until 1970, then at the Ateneum Theatre, National Theatre, Powszechny Theatre, "On Targówku" theatre and Square theatre, and the U Lopka, Pod Egidą, "Tu 60-tka" and "Kaczuch Show" cabarets. In the 1970s, he participated in productions of regular television programs (including Gallux Show and Studio Gama) and radio (60 minut na godzinę). In 1991, he received the Wiktora award for television personality.

From 1991 to 1993, he created the TV series Polskie Zoo.

In the early 1990s, Zaorski retired from active work in theater and film, though at the end of this decade and in the early 2000s, he starred in several TV series, as well as an amateur director. He suffered a stroke in 2004, causing paralysis and significantly reducing his ability to speak with his almost-synonymous voice. Issued in 2006, he wrote an autobiographical novel, Ręka, noga, mózg na ścianie, in which he described the process of recovery from the stroke.

He was a part of the radio novel W Jezioranach.

== Selected filmography ==
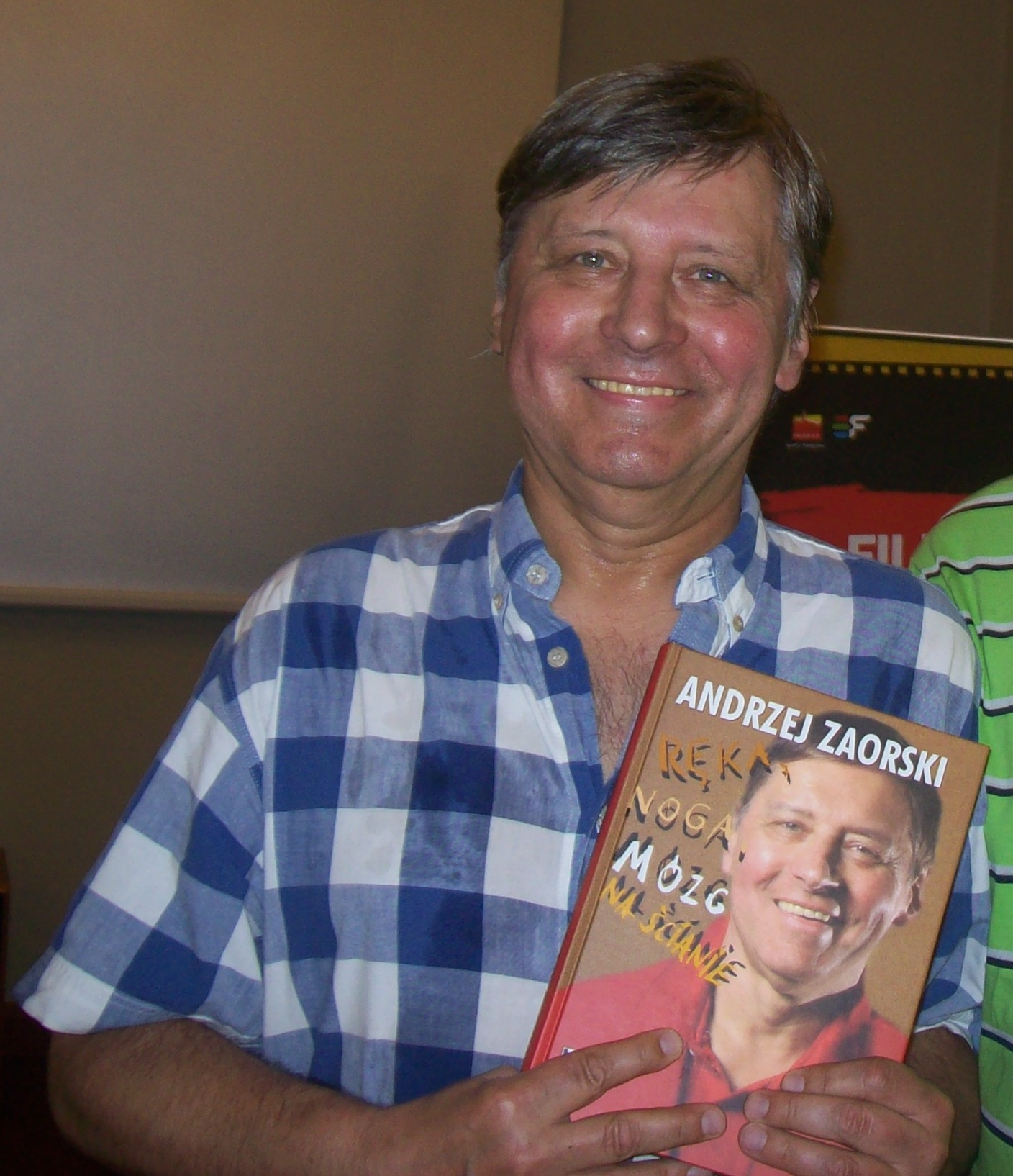
Andrzej Zaorski, 2010

- 1964: Pięciu .... Staszek
- 1966: Marysia i Napoleon .... Porajski - Marysia's Friend
- 1966: Małżeństwo z rozsądku .... Artist
- 1967: The Night of the Generals .... German Radiotelegraphist (uncredited)
- 1967: Westerplatte .... Lt. Zdzisław Kręgielski
- 1967: Stawka większa niż życie .... Romek Górski
- 1967: Paryż - Warszawa bez wizy
- 1968: Dynamit in grüner Seide
- 1968: Ostatni po Bogu .... Martula
- 1969: Zbrodniarz, który ukradł zbrodnie .... Journalist (voice)
- 1970: Album polski .... Anna's Friend
- 1970: Raj na ziemi .... Wiktor Szarówka
- 1971: Epilog norymberski
- 1972: Uciec jak najbliżej .... Colleague
- 1972: Bolesław Śmiały .... Grzegorz, King's knight
- 1974: Ile jest życia (TV Series) .... Jerzy Janas
- 1977: Wielka podróż Bolka i Lolka .... Sprawozdawca (voice)
- 1977: Lalka .... Julian Ochocki
- 1979: Skradziona kolekcja .... Głazik
- 1980: Nasze podwórko .... Tomek's father
- 1985: Baryton .... Ryszard Domagala
- 1987: The Mother of Kings
- 1987: Maskarada .... Cabaret Manager
- 1988: Śmierć Johna L. .... Stefan Nowak
- 1989: Piłkarski poker .... president of the 'Koks' Wałbrzych football club
- 1991: Panny i wdowy .... painter Henryk, Maria's husband
- 2003: Sprawa na dziś (TV Series) .... doorman Maurycy (final appearance)

== Dubbing ==
- 1969 Zbrodniarz, który ukradł zbrodnię - the voice of a "Polish courier"

== Awards ==
- Knight's Cross of the Order of Polonia Restituta in 2012 for outstanding achievements in artistic and creative work, for promoting democratic changes in Poland
- Złoty Mikrofon – 2006
