= Konstanty Ildefons Gałczyński =

Polish poet (1905–1953)

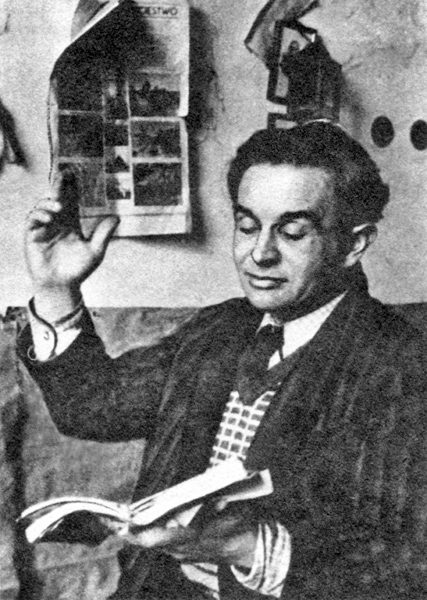
- Konstanty Ildefons Gałczyński in 1947
- Born: Konstanty Ildefons Gałczyński; 23 January 1905; Warsaw, Vistula Land, Russian Empire
- Died: 6 December 1953 (aged 48); Warsaw, Poland
- Resting place: Military Powązki Cemetery
- Occupation: Poet
- Writing career
- Language: Polish
- Notable work: Zaczarowana dorożka

Konstanty Ildefons Gałczyński (23 January 1905 – 6 December 1953), alias Karakuliambro, was a Polish poet. He is well known for the "paradramatic" absurd humorous sketches of the Green Goose Theatre.

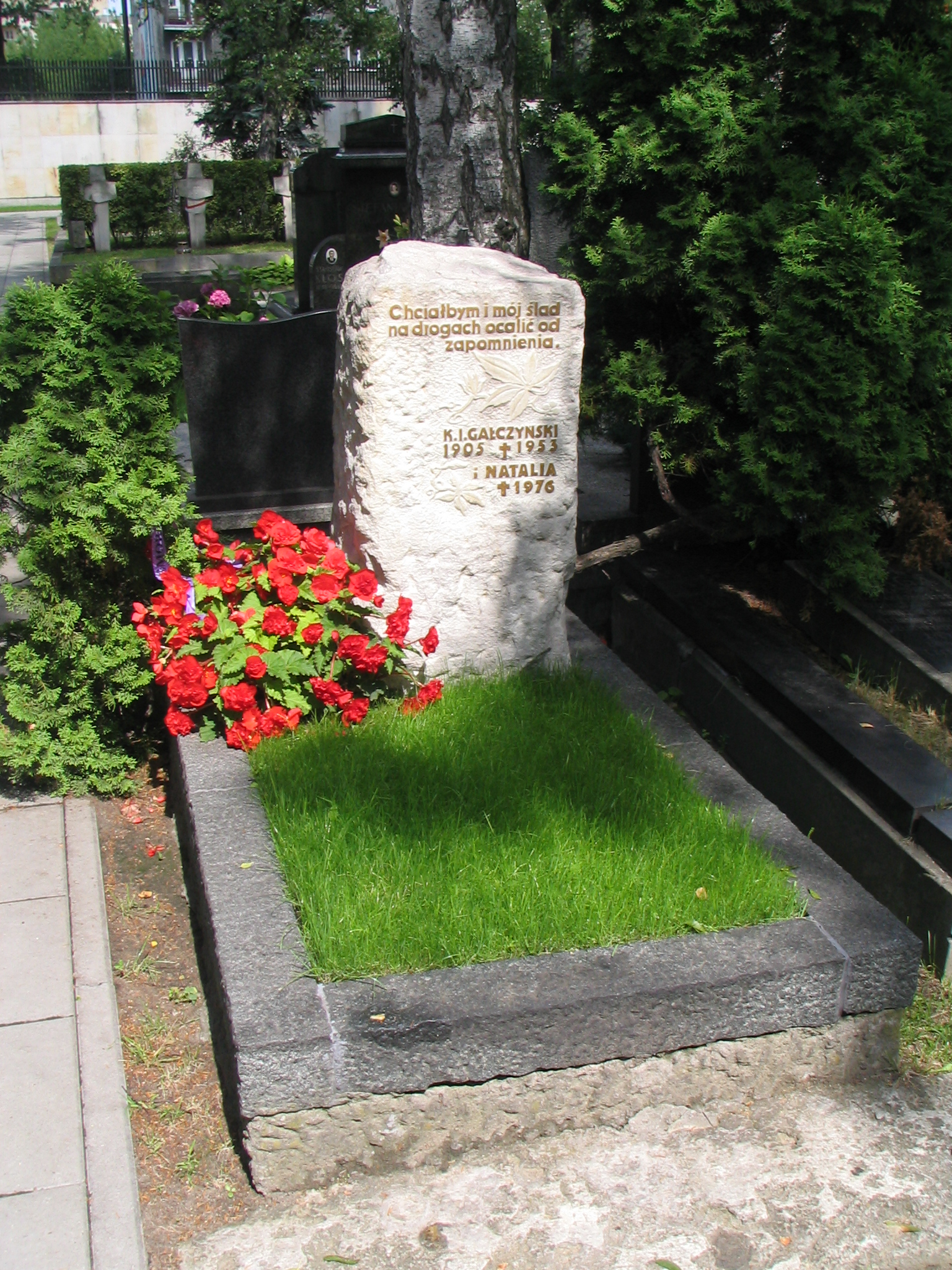
The grave of Konstanty Ildefons Gałczyński and his wife Natalia on the Military Graveyard on Powązki in Warsaw.

== Biography ==
Born to a lower-middle-class family in Warsaw, Gałczyński was evacuated with his parents at the outbreak of World War I, and from 1914 to 1918 he lived in Moscow, where he attended a Polish school. Returning to Poland in 1918, he studied classics and English language at the University of Warsaw, submitting a dissertation on a non-existent nineteenth-century Scottish poet, Morris Gordon Cheats.

His literary debut came in 1923 and was a member of the Kwadryga group of poets, and he was linked to satirical and political publications. In 1930 he married Natalia Avalov. From 1931-33, he held the post of cultural attaché in Berlin. From 1934-36 he was in Vilnius. He settled there at 2 Młynowa Street. There, in 1936, the couple's daughter Kira was born. Through his works, Gałczyński refers to the atmosphere of Vilnius, and that which Adam Mickiewicz left behind.

With the outbreak of World War II, Gałczyński received a draft card from the army. He took part in the Polish September Campaign of 1939. On 17 September, he became a Russian prisoner of war and was later captured by the Germans. He spent the duration of the occupation in the Stalag XI-A prisoner-of-war camp in Altengrabow, his poems printed secretly in anthologies. After the war he travelled to Brussels and Paris, returning to Poland in 1946. He established The 13 Muses Club in Szczecin in 1948 before moving back to Warsaw, and produced work for numerous weekly magazines.

Many of his postwar pieces, including "A Poem for the Traitor" ("Poemat dla zdrajcy"), an attack on Czesław Miłosz, "Chryzostom Bulwieć’s Trip to Ciemnogród" ("Podróż Chryzostoma Bulwiecia do Ciemnogrodu") and the panegyric "Stalin is Dead" ("Umarł Stalin") (1953), were written according to socialist realist conventions. In 1950, he became the object of an ideological battle, his artistic work denounced by Adam Ważyk at the Reunion of Polish Writers as petit bourgeois.

In the later years of his life, he wrote several greater poetic forms:

- "Jan Sebastian Bach's Easter" (1950) ("Wielkanoc Jana Sebastiana Bacha")
- "Niobe" (1951)
- "Wit Stwosz" (1952)
- "Olsztyn Chronicle" (1952) ("Kronika Olsztyńska")

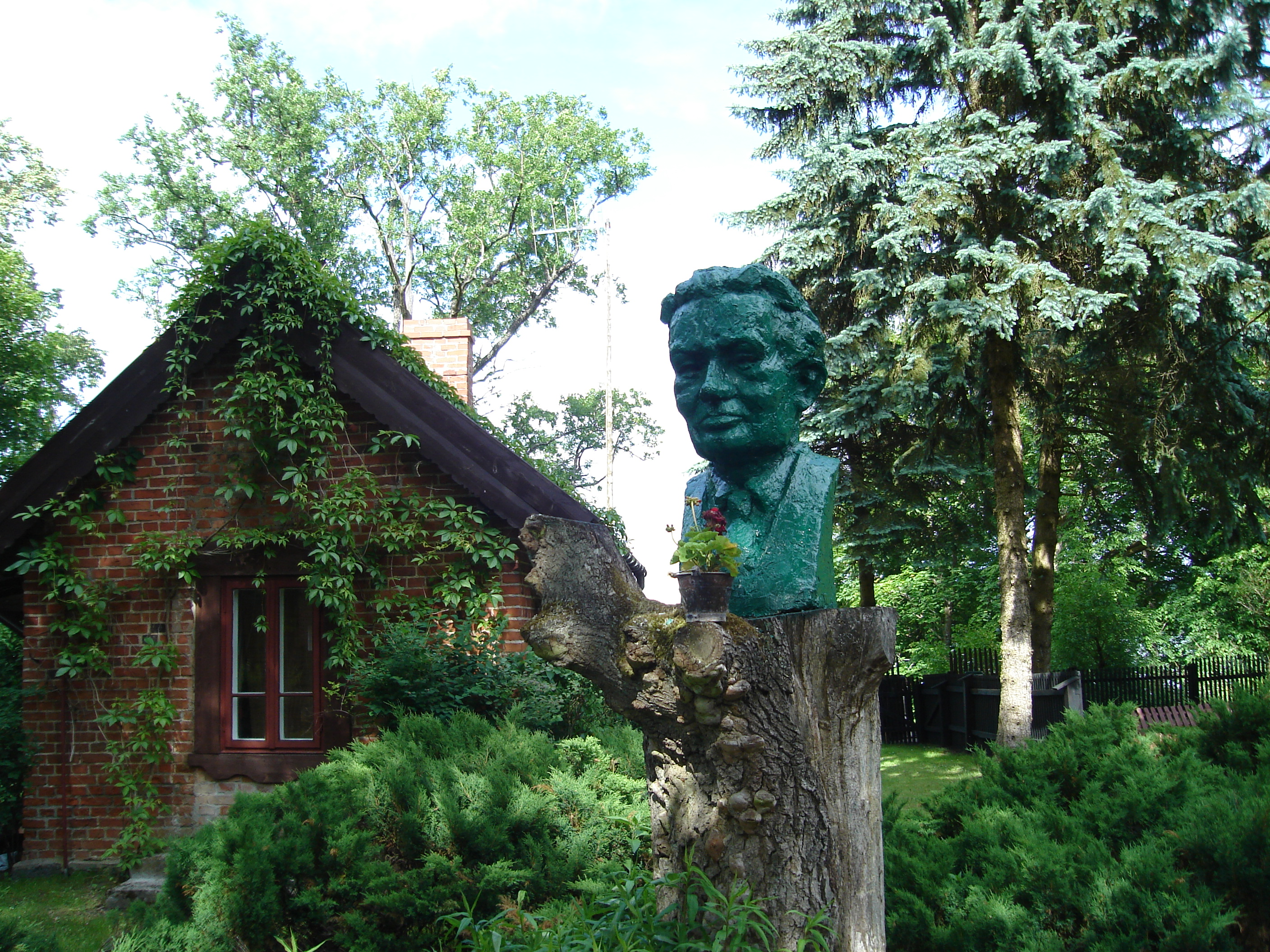
Bust of the poet in front of the museum in the forester's lodge Pranie.

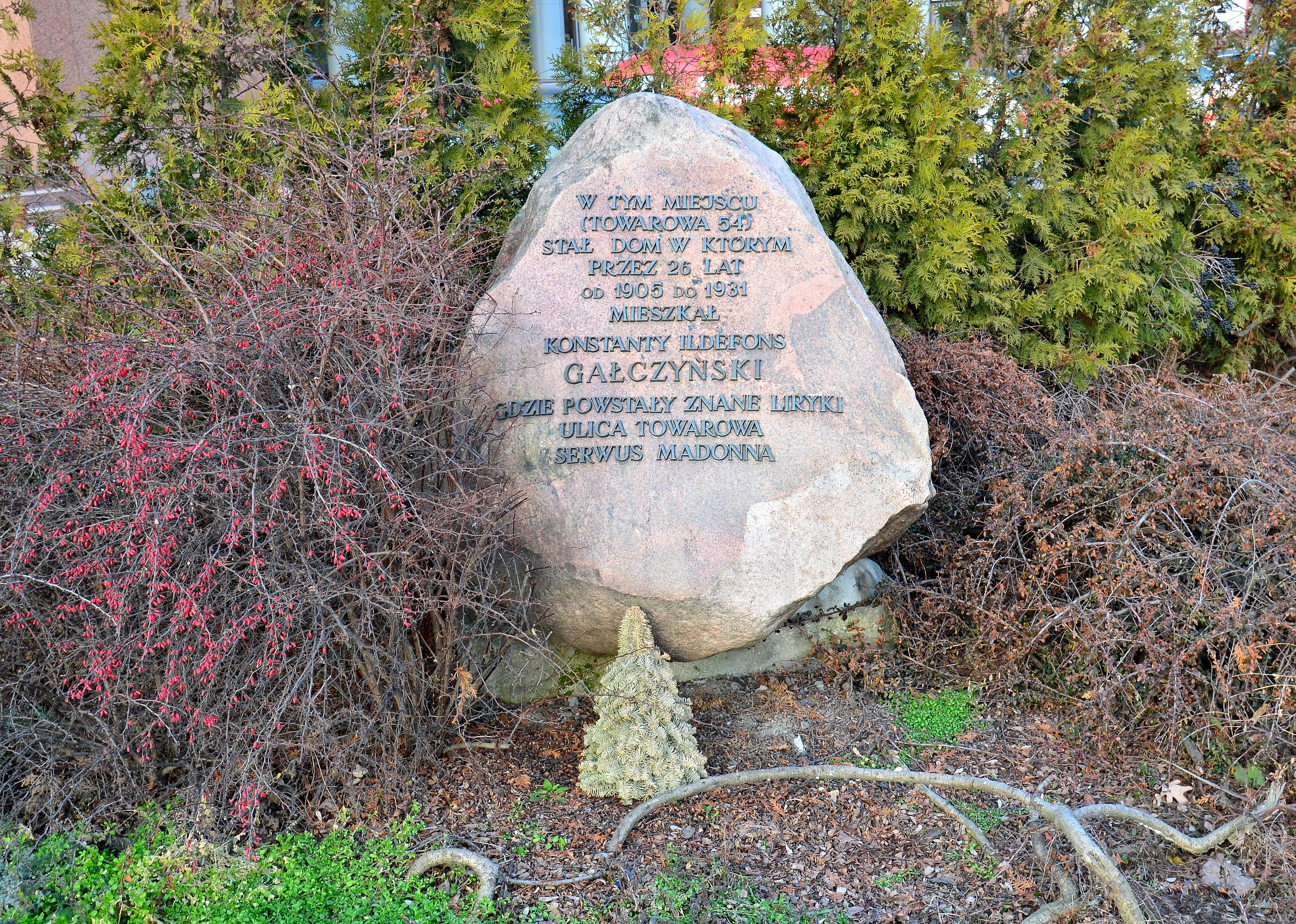
Stone in memory of Konstanty Ildefons Gałczyński at the intersection of Towarowa and Grzybowska Streets in Warsaw where he lived in 1906–1931.

From 1950 to 1953, he was associated with the forester’s lodge at Lake Nidzkie, where he wrote numerous works, including "Olsztyn Chronicle". It is there that his museum is currently located. He published the volumes of poetry Enchanted Droshky (1948) ("Zaczarowana dorożka"), Wedding Rings (1949) ("Ślubne obrączki") and Songs (1953) ("Pieśni"). He also produced translations, or paraphrases, of A Midsummer Night's Dream by William Shakespeare (1952) and Ode to Joy by Friedrich Schiller.

He is portrayed, under the name of 'Delta,' in Miłosz's The Captive Mind (1953).

== Death ==
He died on 6 December 1953, aged 48, following a third heart attack.

== Artistic legacy ==
Gałczyński's poetry is an inspiration to many authors of popular music; some of his poems having a number of interpretations. They were used by Olga Lipińska in her TV cabaret among others. At the time of the People's Republic of Poland, his poem Beloved Country (Ukochany kraj) was made into a socialist feel-good song. A musical, Beloved Country, was directed by Janusz Józefowicz at Studio Buffo musical theatre.

The most famous songs based on a Gałczyński text include the following:

- "The Ballad about Two Sisters" ("Ballada o dwóch siostrach"), with music by Stanisław Staszewski, sung by Kazik Staszewski with Kult
- "The Ballad about Two Sisters" ("Ballada o dwóch siostrach"), with music by Adam Sławiński, sung by Stan Borys
- "The Ballad about Easter Ham" ("Ballada o Wielkanocnej szynce"), with music by Krzysztof Knittel, sung by Jan Kobuszewski
- "Barbara Ubryk" ("Barbara Ubryk"), with music by Krzysztof Knittel, sung by Jan Kobuszewski
- "What Have I Done?"/"What am I Guilty of?" ("Cóżem winien"), with music by Adam Tkaczyk, sung by Tkaczyk with Wyspy Dobrej Nadziei
- "The Woodpecker and the Girl" ("Dzięcioł i dziewczyna"), sung by Maryla Rodowicz
- "The Woodbine" ("Dzikie wino"), music Wojciech Trzciński, sung by Magda Umer
- "Today I Was Lying Again" ("Dziś znowu leżałem"), with music by Jerzy Derfel, sung by Jan Kobuszewski
- "If You Were to Stop Loving Me One Day" ("Gdybyś mnie kiedyś"), with music by Tomasz Łuc, sung by Katarzyna Groniec
- ·"I Say! Let Us In" - II and III part of "Seven Heaven" poem ("Hola, wpuść nas!"), with music by Grzegorz Turnau, sung by Turnau
- "Darling, My Darling" ("The Letter of the Prisoner") ("Kochanie moje, kochanie" – "List jeńca"), with music by A. Panas, sung by Michał Bajor
- "Cocaine" ("Kokaina"), with music by Jerzy Derfel, sung by Piotr Fronczewski
- "Lyric, lyric" ("Liryka, liryka"), with music by Grzegorz Turnau, sung by Turnau
- "Mother Earth" ("Matka Ziemia"), with music by Stanisław Syrewicz, sung by Piotr Fronczewski
- "A Prayer to Guardian Angel" ("Modlitwa do Anioła Stróża"), with music by Adam Tkaczyk, sung by Tkaczyk with Wyspy Dobrej Nadziei
- "A Prayer to Guardian Angel" ("Modlitwa do Anioła Stróża"), with music by Robert Kasprzycki, sung by Kasprzycki and Janusz Radek
- "Everything Will Turn Out Well" ("Na sto dwa"), with music by Jerzy Derfel, sung by Jan Kobuszewski
- "A Night" ("Noc"), with music by the ProForma quartet, sung by Przemysław Lembicz with ProForma
- "I Don’t Write Letters" ("Nie piszę listów"), sung by Mroku on the album Mroczne Nagrania
- "To Rescue from Oblivion" ("Ocalić od zapomnienia"), with music by Marek Grechuta, sung by Grechuta
- "A Song" ("Piosenka"), with music by Artur Gadowski, sung by Gadowski
- "Lament over Izolda" ("Płacz po Izoldzie"), with music by Grzegorz, sung by Turnau
- "A Pump" ("Pompa"), with music by Grzegorz Turnau, sung by Turnau
- "A Request for Happy Islands" ("Prośba o wyspy szczęśliwe"), with music by Stanisław Syrewicz, sung by Magda Umer
- "With Lunar Dust" ("Pyłem księżycowym"), with music by Stanisław Syrewicz, sung by Magda Umer
- "Romance about Three Emigrant Sisters" ("Romanca o trzech siostrach emigrantkach"), with music by Wojciech Waglewski, sung by Jacek Bończyk
- "A Secretary" ("Sekretarka"), with music by Ewa Kornecka, sung by Jacek Wójcicki
- "An Owl" ("In a Dream…") ("Sowa" – "We śnie"), sung by Grzegorz Turnau
- "The Confession of a Fool" ("Spowiedź kretyna"), with music by Stanisław Syrewicz, sung by Piotr Fronczewski
- "A Poet’s Death" ("Śmierć poety"), with music by Stanisław Staszewski, sung by Kazik Staszewski with Kult
- "A Poet’s Death" ("Śmierć poety"), with music by Włodzimierz Korcz, sung by Marian Opania
- "In a Dream" ("We śnie"), with music by Adam Tkaczyk, sung by Adam Tkaczyk with Wyspy Dobrej Nadziei
- "Spring Is Supposed To Come Back, Baroness" ("Wróci wiosna, baronowo"), with music by Stanisław Staszewski, sung by Kazik Staszewski with Kult
- "An Invitation for the Trip" ("Zaproszenie na wycieczkę"), with music by Adam Tkaczyk, sung by Tkaczyk with Wyspy Dobrej Nadziei

== Commemoration ==
Since 1998 a biennial poetry competition has been organised in Szczecin, named Gałczynalie in honour of the poet. A Green Goose foundation was formed in Warsaw in September 2007.

Gałczyński was portrayed in the book The Captive Mind (Zniewolony umysł) by Czesław Miłosz; he is Delta.

There is Konstanty Ildefons Gałczyński Street in Warsaw.

=== Institutions named after Gałczyński ===
Approximately 30 schools in Poland are named after Konstanty Ildefons Gałczyński, among them Secondary School No 1 in Otwock, Secondary School No 2 in Olsztyn, Gymnasium No 7 in Częstochowa, Primary School No 7 in Legnica, Gymnasium No 2 in Stargard Szczeciński and in Poznań Secondary School No 20 and, until 2000, the former Primary School No 37. Gałczyński is also the patron of libraries, one community centre and the Happy Islands Foundation for Friends of Children with Cancer.

== The Green Goose Theatre ==
Among Gałczyński's best known works are the satirical mini-pieces of the Green Goose Theatre ("Teatrzyk Zielona Gęś"). Several hundred of these ostensible dramas, usually only a few lines long, appeared in the Kraków literary journal Przekrój. They frequently parody serious drama and cultural icons – in Hamlet and the Waitress, Hamlet is unable to choose between coffee and tea in a café and expires from indecision to be buried in a coffin marked HAMLET IDIOT, while in Greedy Eve Adam fails to get a bite of the apple, causing the entire Bible to be "a total loss". The final curtain is frequently brought into the action, being variously scripted as falling "optimistically", as coming down accidentally and then going up again, or as being lowered by an anteater.
