= Klops (disambiguation) =

Klops is a Polish version of a meatball.

Klops may also refer to:

- Kabaret TEY, former name of
- Mr. Klops, a fictional character in children's fantasy novel Dunno on the Moon

== See also ==
- Tri-Klops
