= Alina Orlova =

Lithuanian musician

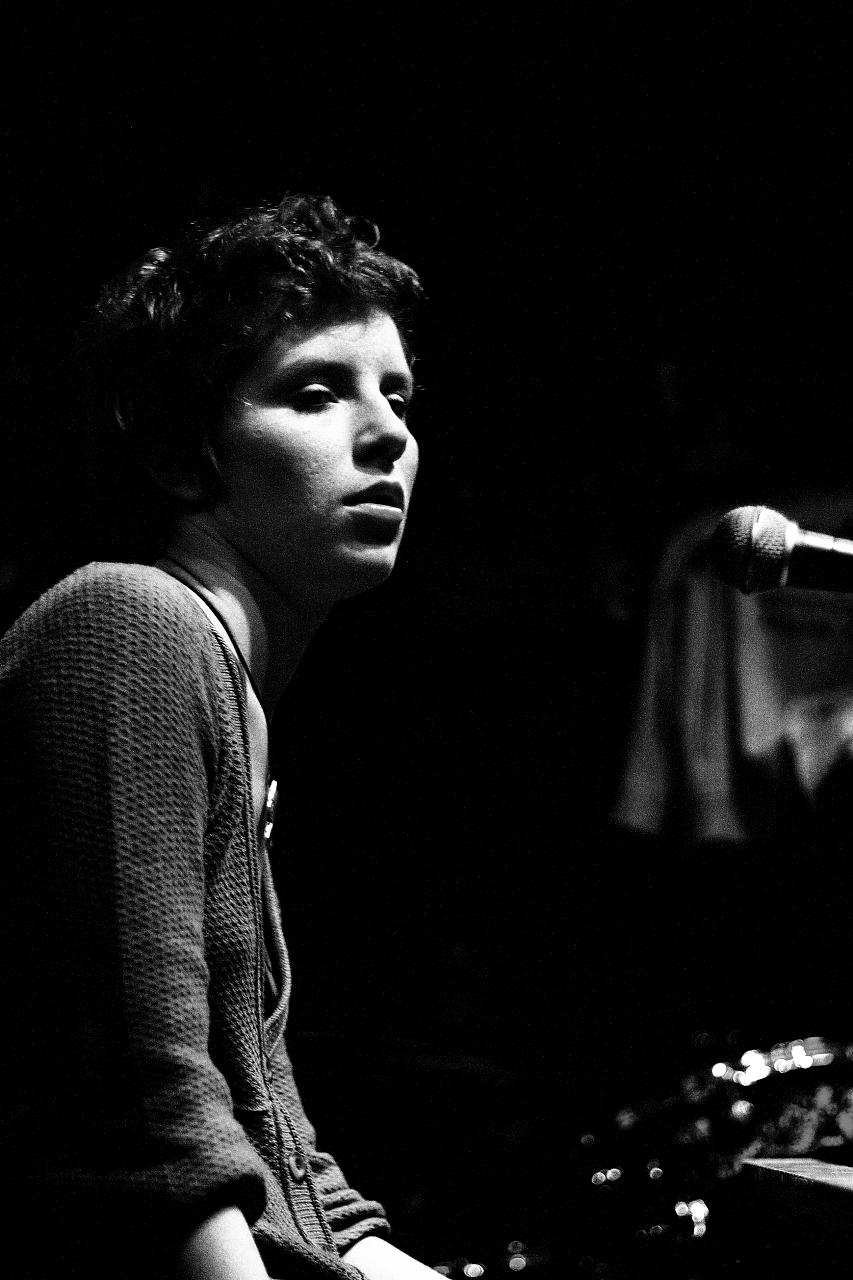
- Orlova in 2008

Background information
- Born: Alina Orlovskaja; 28 June 1988 (age 37); Visaginas, Lithuanian SSR, Soviet Union
- Genres: Sung poetry; Indie folk; Daina
- Instruments: Vocals; piano
- Years active: 2005–present
- Website: myspace.com/alinaorlova

Alina Orlova (Lithuanian: Alina Orlovskaja; Russian: Алина Орловская, romanized: Alina Orlovskaya; born 28 June 1988) is a Lithuanian sung poetry singer and musician.

== Origins ==
Alina is of mixed Polish (father) and Russian (mother) heritage. Her father, a Lithuanian Pole was born in Lithuania and mother in Voronezh. Later their families moved to Kazakhstan and lived in the same house. After marriage they moved to Lithuania, to the town of Visaginas which serviced the Ignalina Nuclear Power Plant, where Alina's father went to work. The town had predominantly Russian population, the Alina's family spoke Russian, but Alina and her brother were sent to the only Lithuanian-speaking school in the town. When asked about her ethnicity (in 2010), Alina said that she did not definitely feel herself Lithuanian or Russian, but that her mentality is definitely Baltic. In her childhood she went to a special musical school and played piano.

== Performing career ==
Orlova both composes her own songs and performs other musicians' cover versions. She generally performs in three languages – Lithuanian, Russian and English.

Orlova's fame preceded her first studio album when she was awarded an alternative music award A.LT back in her home country, while at the same time also being named a "Breakthrough of the year 2006". Her song Nesvarbu was voted by the readers of Lithuanian youth magazine Pravda as the best debut of the year.

In 2008 her debut album Laukinis šuo dingo (The Wild Dog Dingo, named after a Russian book by Ruvim Frayerman for teenagers about teenage love) It is also a word play on the word "dingo" because in lithuanian "dingo" means missing. The album cover can also be translated to The Wild Dog Is Missing. was released under the MetroMusic label and presented in Vilnius St.Catherine church on 22 January; a week later she had a similar concert in Kaunas State Drama Theatre. Later the same year Orlova held concerts in Russia, London, Liverpool. According to her fansite, she is going to perform in Poland, Ireland, participate at Europavox festival in France, and elsewhere.

Orlova received positive recognition both worldwide and in Lithuania where she is seen as a huge success – her "cozy" gigs are highly anticipated there. According to music critics, Orlova has a "high-trilling voice and a unique line in exhilaratingly dark, Baltic folk pop", that "calls immediate attention to itself in a properly distinctive manner". Noticed by the Travis front-man Fran Healy, Alina's song "Vaiduokliai" was picked up as one of the seven tracks to be featured on the digital-only EP, entitled "Play. Stop. Rewind" released worldwide by LIPA Records.

== Discography ==
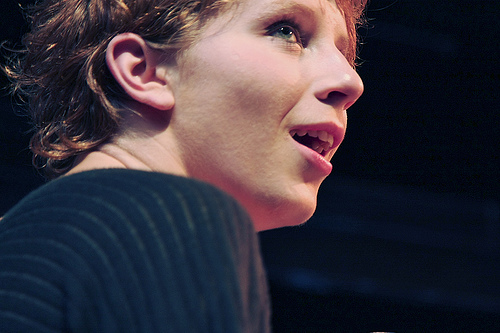
Alina Orlova

=== Albums ===
Year	Album details
2005	Belekokie
2007	Mimino
2008	Laukinis šuo dingo
2010	Mutabor
2015	88
2018	Daybreak
2022	Laumžirgiai
2025	Nakties Atvirukai
