= Let Poland be Poland =

Let Poland be Poland can refer to:

- Żeby Polska była Polską, a 1976 Polish protest song
- Let Poland be Poland (TV), a 1982 US propaganda documentary
