= Agencja Artystyczna MTJ =

Polish record label

- Founded: 1990
- Founder: Tomasz Bujak, Maciej Pluciński
- Genre: various
- Country of origin: Warsaw, Poland
- Location: Poland
- Official website: www.mtj.pl

Agencja Artystyczna MTJ, is a Polish independent record label founded in 1990 by Tomasz Bujak and Maciej Pluciński.

Although founded in 1990 label started operating in 1995 after signing recording deal with singer Ryszard Rynkowski. In early years company was music warehouse store. In later years label released albums by such artists as Antonina Krzysztoń, Magda Umer, Lady Pank, Stan Borys, Magda Femme and Marian Opania among others. Till 2014 label released over 1500 titles. Under various licenses label released also albums by such artists as Jan Bo, Anna Jurksztowicz, Zdzisława Sośnicka, Lech Janerka and Farben Lehre among others.

Labels bestselling artists include Michał Bajor, Sławek Wierzcholski i Nocna Zmiana Bluesa, and Mazowsze among others, with several albums certified Gold and Platinum in Poland.

In 1990s label run a subsidiary Mega Czad witch released rock and heavy metal albums. Other subsidiaries include disco polo oriented Blue Mix and Małe MTJ witch released children's music.

== Artists ==
=== Current ===
- Agnieszka Babicz
- Andrzej Poniedzielski
- Antonina Krzysztoń
- Atlas Like
- Aurelia Luśnia
- Dorota Osińska
- Felicjan Andrzejczak
- Heroes Get Remembered
- Jakub Pawlak
- Joanna Lewandowska
- Mama Selita
- Magda Femme
- Magda Umer
- Małgorzata Ostrowska
- Michał Bajor
- Olga Bończyk
- Robert Janowski

=== Former ===
- Jarosław Wasik
- Lady Pank
- Magda Piskorczyk
- Marian Opania
- Marek Szurawski
- Natalia Sikora
- Ryszard Rynkowski
- Sławek Wierzcholski i Nocna Zmiana Bluesa
- Stan Borys
- Tomasz Szwed
- Voo Voo
