= Michał Bajor =

Polish actor & musician (born 1957)

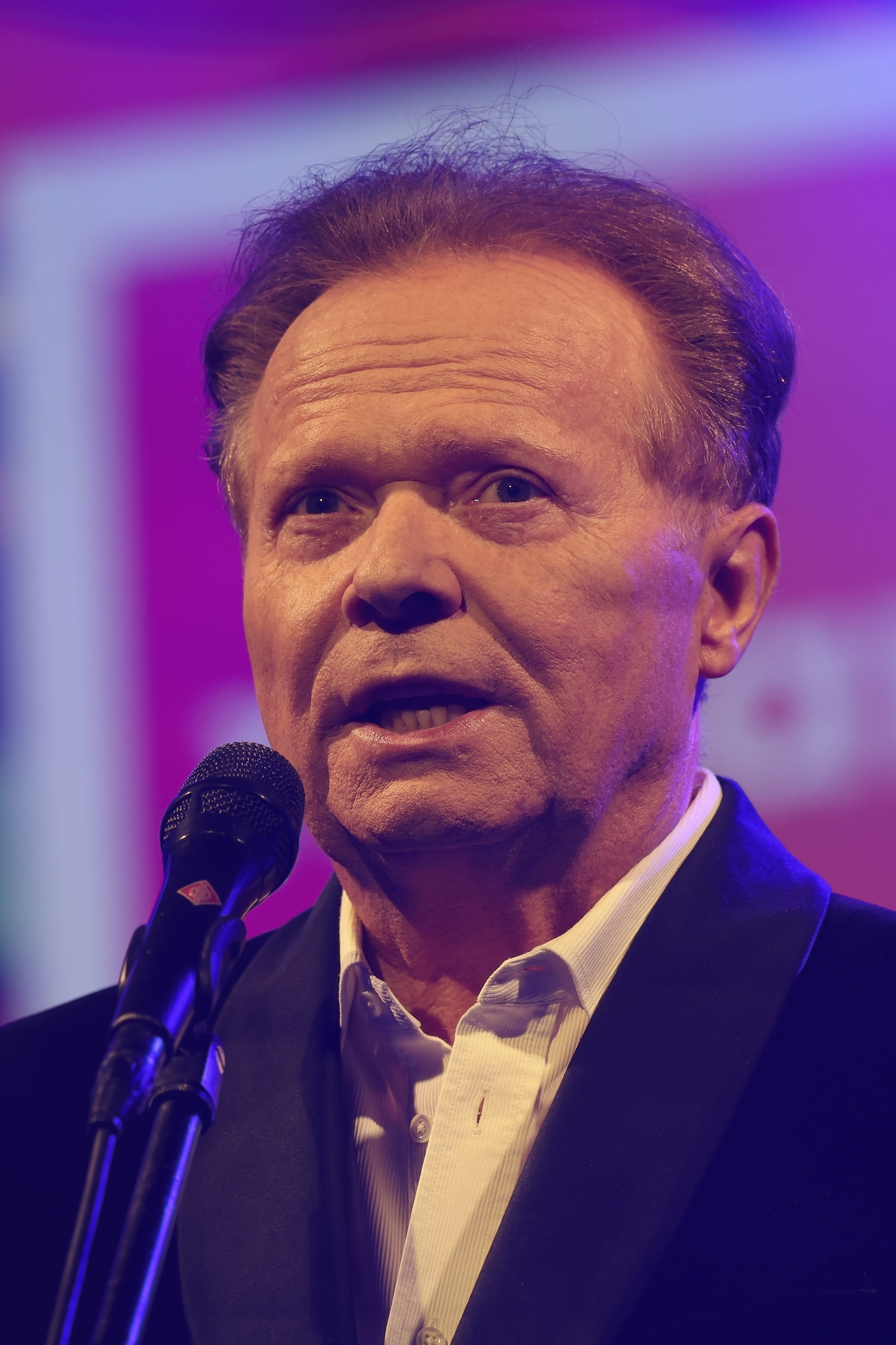
- At the Pol'and'Rock Festival 2025
- Born: 13 June 1957 (age 69); Głuchołazy, Poland
- Education: The Aleksander Zelwerowicz National Academy of Dramatic Art in Warsaw
- Occupations: Actor, singer
- Relatives: Piotr Bajor (brother)none
- Musical career
- Genres: Sung poetry
- Labels: Veriton, Polonia Records, EMI Music Poland, Sony Music Entertainment Poland, Agencja Artystyczna MTJ
- Website: www.michalbajor.pl

Michał Bajor (born 13 June 1957 in Głuchołazy, Poland) is a Polish actor and musician. Bajor’s songs are based on texts by Wojciech Młynarski, Jonasz Kofta, Andrzej Ozga, Marcin Sosnowski, and Julian Tuwim. He is a member of the Academy of the Polish Society of the Phonographic Industry.

== Selected filmography ==
- W biały dzień (1980) as Paweł Świętorzecki “Biały”
- Alchemist (1988) as Prince Frederick
- Escape from the 'Liberty' Cinema (1990) as film critic
- Quo Vadis (2001) as ancient Roman Emperor Nero

== Discography ==
=== Studio albums ===
Title	Album details	Peak chart positions	Sales	Certifications
Title	Album details	POL	Sales	Certifications
Nowe Piosenki	Released: 1988; Label: Veriton; Formats: CD	—		
Michał Bajor '93	Released: 1993; Label: Polonia Records; Formats: CD	—		
Kings and Queens	Released: 1993; Label: Sonia Company; Formats: CD	—		
Michał Bajor '95	Released: 1995; Label: Agencja Artystyczna MTJ; Formats: CD, digital download	—		
Uczucia...	Released: 1998; Label: Agencja Artystyczna MTJ; Formats: CD, digital download	—		
Kocham jutro	Released: October 14, 2000; Label: EMI Music Poland; Formats: CD	36		
Twarze w lustrach	Released: September 30, 2002; Label: Sony Music Poland; Formats: CD	10		
Za kulisami	Released: February 4, 2004; Label: Sony Music Poland; Formats: CD	7		
Inna bajka	Released: October 15, 2007; Label: Agencja Artystyczna MTJ; Formats: CD, digital download	20	POL: 15,000+	POL: Gold
Piosenki Marka Grechuty i Jonasza Kofty	Released: October 12, 2009; Label: Agencja Artystyczna MTJ; Formats: CD, digital download	6	POL: 30,000+	POL: Platinum
Od Piaf do Garou	Released: October 21, 2011; Label: Agencja Artystyczna MTJ; Formats: CD, digital download	8	POL: 30,000+	POL: Platinum
Moje podróże	Released: October 14, 2013; Label: Agencja Artystyczna MTJ; Formats: CD, digital download	15		
"—" denotes a recording that did not chart or was not released in that territory.

=== Live albums ===
Title	Album details	Sales	Certifications
Live	Released: 1987; Label: Polskie Nagrania Muza; Formats: CD		
Michał Bajor 30/30. Największe przeboje	Released: October 17, 2005; Label: Agencja Artystyczna MTJ; Formats: CD, digital download	POL: 30,000+	POL: Platinum

=== Compilation albums ===
Title	Album details	Peak chart positions	Sales	Certifications
Title	Album details	POL	Sales	Certifications
Michał Bajor 83 – 93 (vol. 1,2,3,4)	Released: 1999; Label: Agencja Artystyczna MTJ; Formats: CD	—		
Błędny rycerz. Złota kolekcja	Released: August 28, 2000; Label: EMI Music Poland; Formats: CD	40	POL: 15,000+	POL: Gold
"—" denotes a recording that did not chart or was not released in that territory.

=== Christmas albums ===
Title	Album details
Michał Bajor śpiewa kolędy	Released: 1991; Label: Polonia Records; Formats: CD
W dzień Bożego Narodzenia	Released: 1999; Label: Agencja Artystyczna MTJ; Formats: CD, digital download
