= Pod Egidą =

Pod Egidą ("under the aegis") is a Polish satirical cabaret. It has been created in 1967 on the initiative of singer-songwriter Jan Pietrzak, and is still active (as of 2012). "Under the aegis" was a politically charged cliché in the Soviet Union dominated Eastern Europe.

== History ==
The cabaret was formed in 1967 as a continuation of a popular student cabaret Hybrydy. The first performance took place on February 10, 1968. The first performers included Jan Pietrzak, Jonasz Kofta, Adam Kreczmar, Jan Raczkowski, Krzysztof Paszek, Hanna Okuniewicz, Barbara Kraftówna, Anna Prucnal, Kazimierz Rudzki, Wojciech Siemion, Wojciech Brzozowicz, and Jan Tadeusz Stanisławski. Between 1967 and 1975 the main stage of the Kabaret Pod Egidą was a small palace of the Society of Friends of Fine Arts (Towarzystwo Przyjaciół Sztuk Pięknych) in Warsaw at ul. Chmielna 5 street. The group often commented on the political and social realities of the communist Poland, which resulted in government sanctions and censorship. By the late 1970s the group faced numerous evictions, and was banned in the state-owned media.

With the rise of Solidarity, the group gained much fame due to its performance of the unofficial Solidarity's anthem, the patriotic song Ukochany kraj. The group was banned in the aftermath of the 1981 crackdown on Solidarity, and resumed its performances only in the mid-1980s.

Among its regular contributors and artists, in the 1980s, were such personalities of the Polish theatre scene as Ewa Dałkowska, Ewa Błaszczyk, Edyta Geppert, Piotr Fronczewski, Wojciech Pszoniak, Jerzy Dobrowolski, Janusz Gajos, Kazimierz Kaczor, Paweł Dłużewski, Marek Majewszki, and Krzysztof Daukszewicz. In the 1990s the cabaret performed regularly in Kraków and Bytom, with more artist including Jacek Kaczmarski and Marcin Wolski. It is directed by Pietrzak himself, hailing from the Cultural Centre of the Ochota district of Warsaw. Style of the cabaret is unique, developed over many years of regular performances marred by political censorship in the People's Republic of Poland. The texts were written with special care by Agnieszka Osiecka, Daniel Passent, Rafał Ziemkiewicz, Maciej Rybiński and others.
