= Magda Umer =

Polish singer (1949–2025)

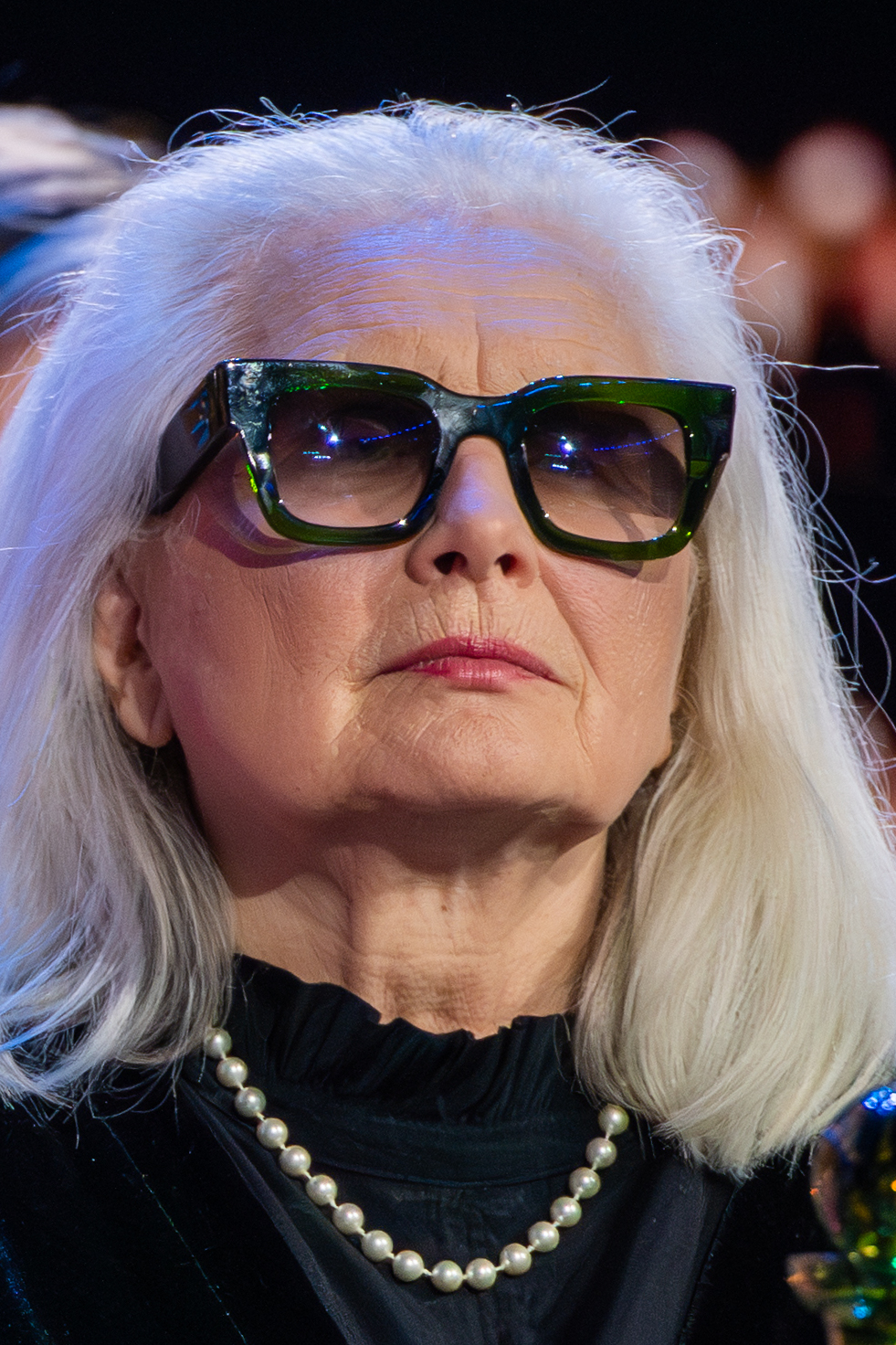
- Umer in 2025
- Born: Małgorzata Umer; 9 October 1949; Warsaw, Poland
- Died: 12 December 2025 (aged 76)
- Education: University of Warsaw
- Occupations: Singer, journalist, author, film director, screenwriter, actress
- Years active: 1973–2025
- Musical career
- Genres: Sung poetry
- Instrument: Vocals
- Labels: Polton; Pronit; Pomaton EMI; EMI Music Poland; Agencja Artystyczna MTJ
- Website: magdaumer.pl

Małgorzata Magda Umer-Przeradzka (/ˈʊmɛər/; 9 October 1949 – 12 December 2025) was a Polish singer, performer of sung poetry, journalist, author, film director, screenwriter, and actress. Umer released five studio albums and won various competitions throughout her career.

== Life and career ==
Małgorzata Magda Umer was born to Edward Umer, the head of the Special Section of the Main Directorate of Information of the Polish Army, and Stanisława Umer. Her father was the son of Otylia and Wincenty Umer, brother of Adam Humer. Both of Magda Umer's parents were atheists; she converted to Roman Catholicism as an adult.

She graduated from Klement Gottwald High School in Warsaw (now the Stanisław Staszic High School). Later she studied at the Faculty of Polish Philology at Warsaw University. She made her debut in the late 1960s by singing in student cabarets. The debuted towards the end of the 1960s, performing in student stage groups, e. g. at the club Stodoła. In 1969, having successfully participated at the Winter Song Exchange competition [Pl. Zimowa Giełda Piosenki] she was allowd to compete as a newcomer during the Opole Song Festival, being distinguished for her performance. A month later she was victorious during the Polish Students' Art Festival [Pl. Festiwal Artystyczny Młodzieży Akademickiej]. In 1970, the won during that same competition again, and in 1971, she was also crowned during that year's Opole Music Festival. She continued to sing and compete throughout the 1970s and 1980s.

Umer had two sons, Mateusz and Franciszek. She died on 12 December 2025, aged 76, of pancreatic cancer in a hospital in Warsaw after a six-month struggle with the disease

== Awards and honors ==
Umer was a winner of the 7th Opole Song Festival.

By order of the President of the Republic of 15 December 2000 "for outstanding contribution to the activities of the student movement, for achievements in social work" Umer was awarded the Knight's Cross of the Order of Polonia Restituta.

== Discography ==
=== Studio albums ===
Title	Album details	Peak chart positions
Title	Album details	POL
Magda Umer	Released: 1972; Label: Pronit; Formats: LP	—
Magda Umer	Released: 1985; Label: Polton; Formats: LP, CD	—
Noce i sny	Released: 26 November 2010; Label: Agencja Artystyczna MTJ; Formats: CD, digital download	24
Wciąż się na coś czeka	Released: 30 November 2012; Label: Agencja Artystyczna MTJ; Formats: CD, digital download	50
Duety. Tak młodo jak teraz	Released: 30 October 2015; Label: Agencja Artystyczna MTJ; Formats: CD, digital download	1
"—" denotes a recording that did not chart or was not released in that territory.

=== Collaborative albums ===
Title	Album details	Peak chart positions
Title	Album details	POL
Kołysanki utulanki with Grzegorz Turnau	Released: 12 June 2003; Label: Pomaton EMI; Formats: CD, digital download	32
"—" denotes a recording that did not chart or was not released in that territory.

=== Compilation albums ===
Title	Album details	Peak chart positions	Sales	Certifications
Title	Album details	POL	Sales	Certifications
Gdzie ty jesteś	Released: 1995; Label: Pomaton EMI; Formats: CD	—		
Wszystko skończone	Released: 9 January 1995; Label: Pomaton EMI; Formats: CD	—		
Koncert jesienny	Released: 6 February 1995; Label: Pomaton EMI; Formats: CD	—		
O niebieskim, pachnącym groszku – Złota kolekcja	Released: 27 November 1999; Label: Pomaton EMI; Formats: CD	—		
Kolekcja 20-lecia Pomatonu	Released: 15 January 2010; Label: EMI Music Poland; Formats: CD	21	POL: 15,000+	POL: Gold
"—" denotes a recording that did not chart or was not released in that territory.

=== Video albums ===
Title	Video details	Sales	Certifications
Chlip-Hop with Andrzej Poniedzielski and Wojciech Borkowski	Released: 4 December 2008; Label: Agora SA; Formats: DVD	POL: 5,000+	POL: Gold
