= Polskie Zoo =

Polish television series

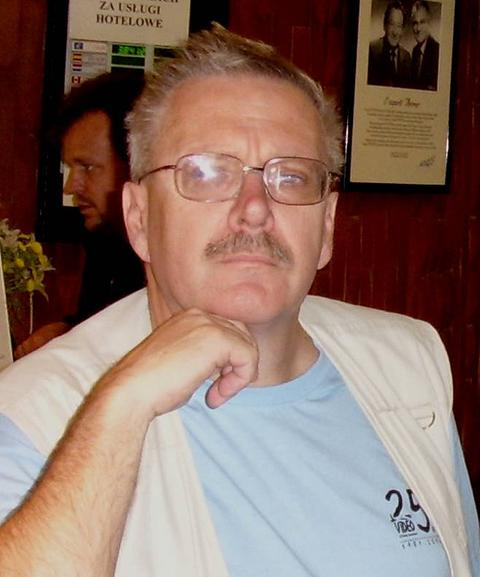
Producer Marcin Wolski

Polskie Zoo is a Polish satirical TV program, produced by Marcin Wolski, and aired every Saturday night by Telewizja Polska station TVP1 between September 21 1991 to June 25 1994. It was focused on the political reality and the leading politicians in the country; and arranged as a puppet show with animals living in a Zoo. The screenplay was written by Marcin Wolski with puppets designed by Jacek Frankowski. The music was composed by Włodzimierz Korcz.

== Puppets featured in the Zoo ==
- Leszek Balcerowicz – horse
- Jan Krzysztof Bielecki – lynx
- Ryszard Bugaj – porcupine
- George H. W. Bush – turkey
- Wiesław Chrzanowski – moose
- Włodzimierz Cimoszewicz – jackal
- Bill Clinton – American bison
- Bronisław Geremek – goat
- Maciej Giertych – black rhinoceros
- József Antall - gazelle
- Aleksander Hall – cane toad
- Václav Havel – marmot
- Gabriel Janowski – butterfly
- Wojciech Jaruzelski – crow
- Boris Yeltsin – polar bear
- Marek Jurek – rat
- Jarosław and Lech Kaczyńscy – hamster
- Helmut Kohl – walrus
- Janusz Korwin-Mikke – housefly
- Jacek Kuroń – hippopotamus
- Aleksander Kwaśniewski – wild boar
- Maciej Jankowski – buffalo
- Antoni Macierewicz – Irish Setter
- John Major - unicorn
- Tadeusz Mazowiecki – tortoise
- Adam Michnik – red fox
- Leszek Miller – spider
- Alfred Miodowicz – honeybee
- François Mitterrand – rooster
- Leszek Moczulski – hawk
- Stefan Niesiołowski – bat
- Andrzej Olechowski – kangaroo
- Józef Oleksy – dinosaur
- Jan Olszewski – koala
- Janusz Onyszkiewicz - bengal tiger
- Waldemar Pawlak – bull
- Jan Rokita – Tasmanian devil
- Andrzej Stelmachowski – ground squirrel
- Krzysztof Skubiszewski – beaver
- Hanna Suchocka – llama
- Donald Tusk – duck
- Stanisław Tymiński – condor
- Danuta Wałęsa – gerbil
- Lech Wałęsa – lion
