= Jan Pietrzak =

Polish satirist

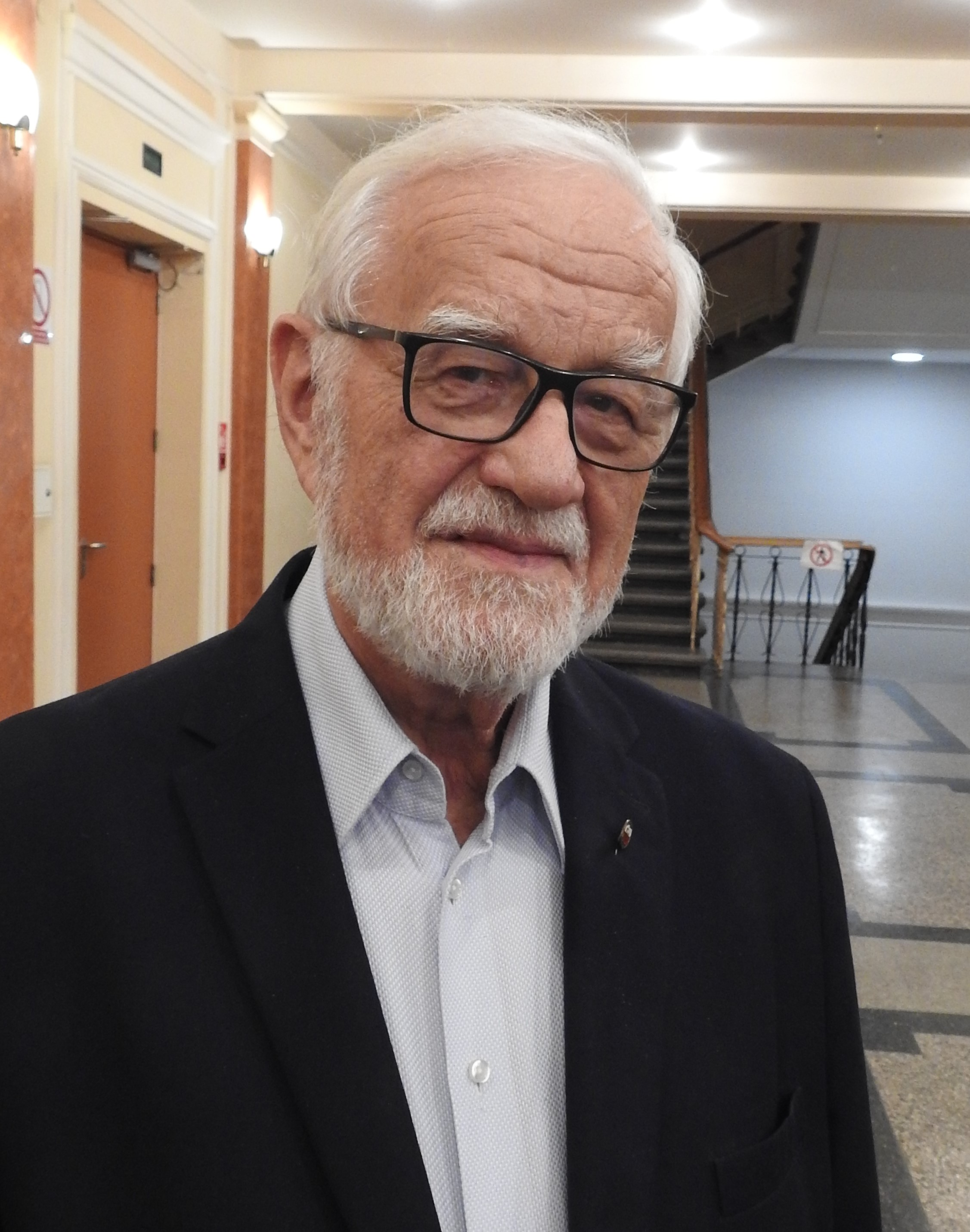
- Born: 26 April 1937 (age 88); Warsaw, Second Polish Republic
- Occupation(s): Satirist, singer-songwriter, stage and film actor, and columnist
- Years active: 1960s–present
- Employer: Tygodnik Solidarność

Jan Pietrzak (pronounced [ˈjan ˈpʲɛtʃak]; born 26 April 1937) is a Polish satirist, singer-songwriter, stage and film actor, and columnist for Tygodnik Solidarność (Solidarity Weekly).

== Career ==
Pietrzak was in Warsaw, with Jonasz Kofta, when he co-founded the student cabaret club Hybrydy, which operated in 1962–67.

In 1967 Pietrzak founded Pod Egidą ("Under the Aegis"), a subversive Warsaw literary cabaret. Pietrzak was one of the more popular voices of anticommunism in the People's Republic of Poland.

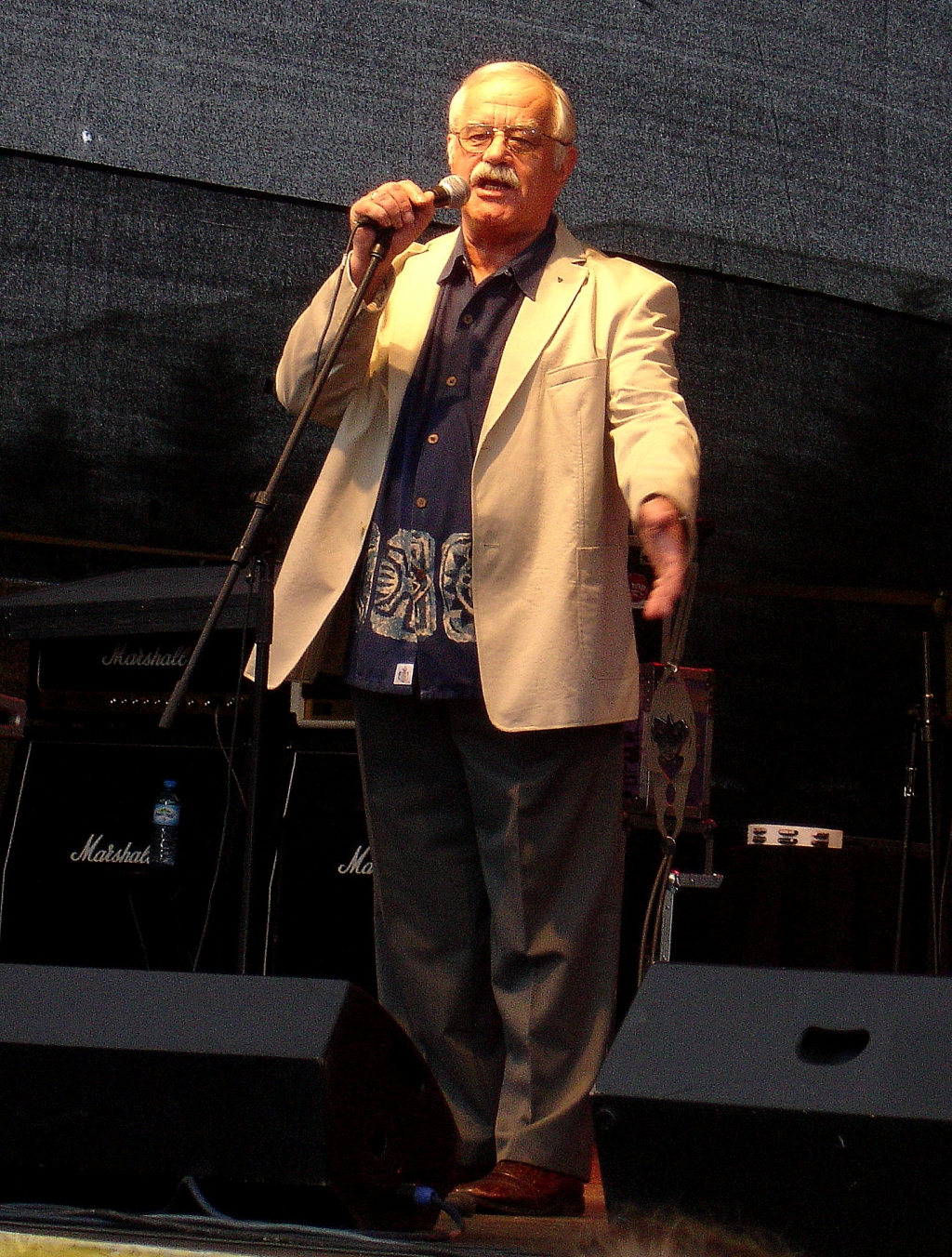
Jan Pietrzak

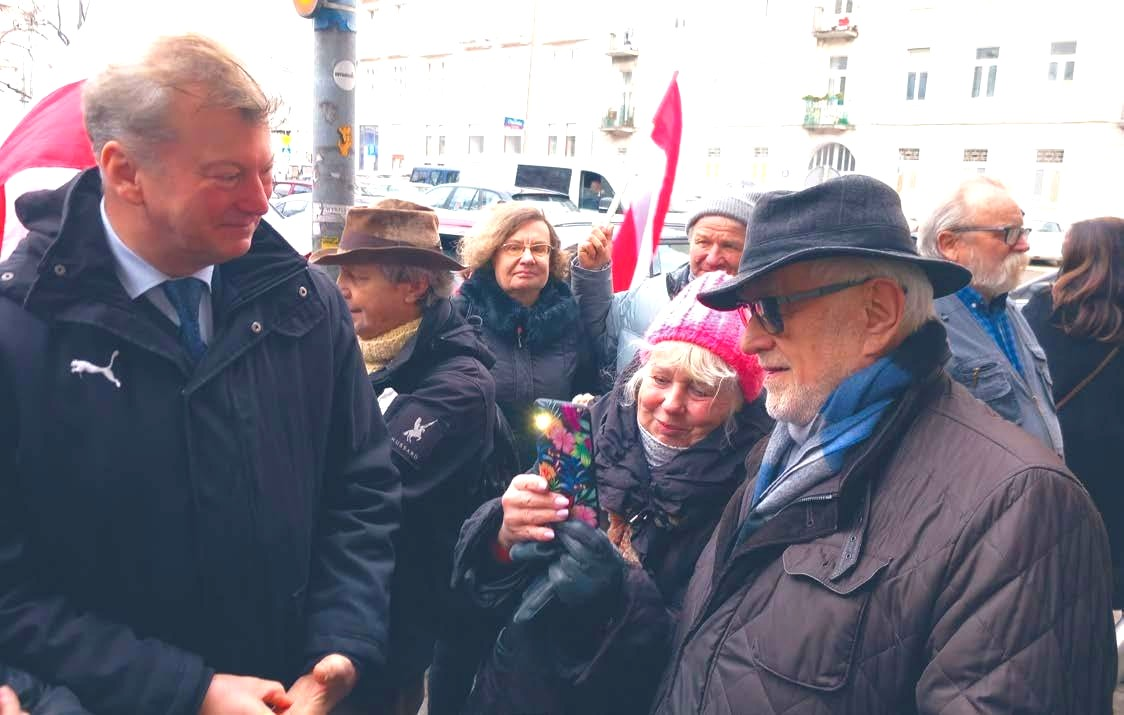
Jan Pietrzak and his adherents, at the entrance to The Prosecutor Office, 28, Chocimska Street, Warsaw, the photograph of 5 February 2024

Pietrzak attained country-wide and international recognition during the Solidarity years especially with his protest song, "Żeby Polska była Polską" ("So that Poland Could be Poland"—abroad, often called "Let Poland Be Poland") with music by Włodzimierz Korcz. The song became the widely accepted informal anthem of Poland's Solidarity period.

In February 2024 he was called to The Prosecutor Office in Warsaw in connection with his jokes concerning the compulsory distribution and settlement of the illegal immigrants in Poland. – See the picture at the bottom.

== Awards ==
In 1979, the authorities of the PRL – Polish People's Republic awarded Pietrzak with the Golden Cross of Merit.

On 3 May 2009 Pietrzak was decorated by the President of Poland with the Order of Polonia Restituta.

== See also ==
- List of Poles
