= Bohdan Smoleń =

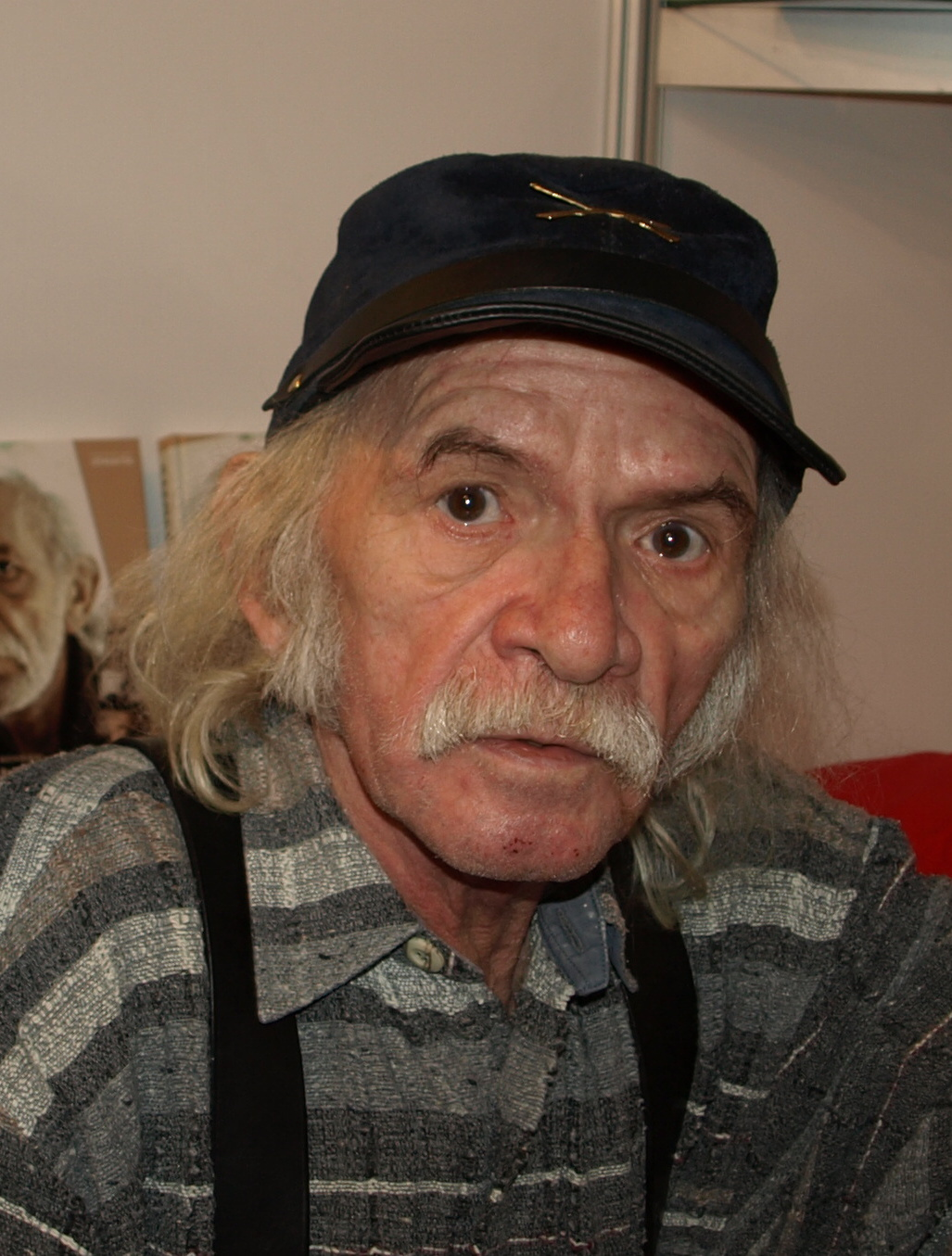
- Born: 9 June 1947; Bielsko-Biała, Poland
- Died: 15 December 2016 (aged 69); Poznań, Poland
- Education: Agricultural University of Kraków
- Occupations: Comedian, singer, actor
- Musical career
- Genres: Pop, folk, comedy, eurodance, Disco polo
- Labels: Atomica, ZPR Records, Omega Music, Dens, Polskie Radio

Bohdan Smoleń (9 June 1947 – 15 December 2016) was a Polish comedian, singer and actor. He was a member of the Kabaret TEY, and was featured in the television show The Lousy World.

On 20 May 2009 he was awarded the silver medal "Zasłużony Kulturze - Gloria Artis" for his contributions to Polish culture.

== Death ==
He died in a Poznań hospital on 15 December 2016 from a serious infection linked to lung disease. He was 69.

== Discography ==
- Ani be, ani me, ani kukuryku (1995)
- Rzężenia Smolenia aka Śpiewam piosenki, Dzieła wybrane *cz. I i Mężczyzną być (1988)
- Rzężę po raz drugi, spłacę wasze długi
- Stawiam wciąż na Lecha (1993)
- Szalałeś, szalałeś (1995)
- Widziały gały co brały (1996)
- Jubileusz, czyli 50 lat wątroby Bohdana Smolenia (1997)
- 6 dni z życia kolonisty (2003)
- Aaa tam cicho być... (2004)
- Na chorobowym (2004)
- Amerykańska gra (1996)
- Dorota ma kota (1995)
- Na chorobowym (2004)
- Cepry Hej ! (1995)
