= Olga Lipińska =

Polish theatre director, screenwriter and TV comedy producer

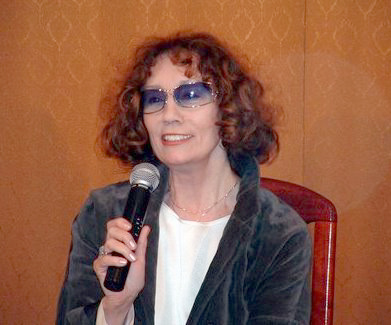
- Interview with Olga Lipińska
- Born: 6 April 1939 (age 87); Piotrków Trybunalski, Poland
- Occupations: Theatre director, producer
- Years active: 1964–2012

Olga Lipińska (born 6 April 1939 in Piotrków Trybunalski) is a Polish theatre director, screenwriter, and TV comedy producer, best known for her TV cabaret called the Kabaret Olgi Lipińskiej (Cabaret of Olga Lipińska).

== Biography ==
She graduated in 1964 from the Faculty of Directing at the Warsaw Theatre Academy (then Państwowa Wyższa Szkoła Teatralna), where she was associated with the Student Satirical Theatre. Between 1977–1990 she was an executive producer at the Teatr Komedia in Warsaw.

Lipińska began her TV career as director considerably early. In 1973, she produced Damy i huzary by Aleksander Fredro, followed by TV production of play by Ivo Brešan in 1985, and more Polish dramas by Fredro: Gwałtu, co się dzieje (1992), Zemsta (1994); Baryłeczka by Guy de Maupassant (1995), Ja się nie boję braci Rojek by Konstanty Ildefons Gałczyński (2003) and an opera Cud mniemany, czyli Krakowiacy i górale by Wojciech Bogusławski in 2007. At the same time, Lipińska produced satirical cabarets for Telewizja Polska including: Głupia sprawa (10 episodes, 1968–1970), Gallux Show (10 episodes, 1970–1974), Właśnie leci kabarecik (10 episodes, 1975–1977), Kurtyna w górę (18 episodes, 1977–1981), and finally, her best-known and most important work, Kabaret Olgi Lipińskiej. Between 1990 and 1992, she ran a talk-show for TVP1 called Piosenki z Kabaretu Olgi Lipińskiej (Songs of Olga Lipińska cabaret).

== Media ==
In the 2009 interview for Przekrój magazine conducted by Piotr Najsztub in Warsaw, which marked her cabaret's return to the airwaves, Lipińska said that all she really wanted was to make the world a better place; there was no communism to begin with – she said – only the Soviet-style socialism which was bound to collapse. In the People's Republic of Poland she wanted to inform the public about the real state of affairs, because – as Lipińska said, 70 percent of viewers according to survey, could not make sense of the weather-report on state television. However, she is not pleased with what happened after the Revolutions of 1989, especially about the new-found religiousness visible across the country and the capitalist economy which makes everyone fear for their own unknown future.

For over a dozen years, Lipińska was regularly publishing essays on culture in Twój Styl magazine leading to her own book of collected essays called Mój pamiętnik potoczny (My colloquial memoir) published in 2005. Her second book of commentaries on arts, culture and politics entitled Co by tu jeszcze... (What else...) was published in 2009. Lipińska is the recipient of numerous medals and awards including the Order of Polonia Restituta (Krzyż Kawalerski Orderu Odrodzenia Polski) and the Cross of Merit (Złoty Krzyż Zasługi).
