= Stan Borys =

Polish musician, actor, and director

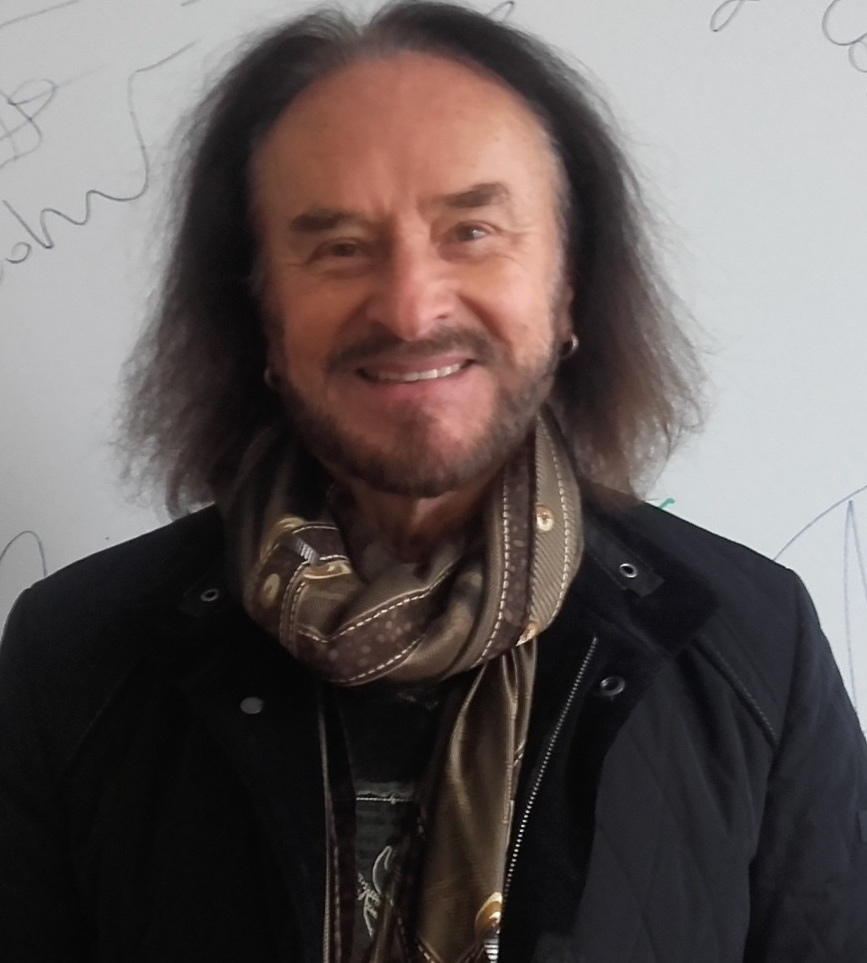
- Borys in 2016

Background information
- Born: September 3, 1941
- Origin: Załęże, Poland
- Genres: Rock; Pop; Sung poetry
- Occupation: Singer-songwriter
- Years active: 1961 –
- Labels: Agencja Artystyczna MTJ, Warner Music Poland

Stan Borys or Stanisław Guzek (born September 3, 1941, in Załęże (now a district of Rzeszów)) is a Polish singer-songwriter, actor, director and poet.

In his over 50-year-long (celebrated 2011) musical career he has recorded 8 albums, has been a performer at festivals in Opole, Sopot, Sotend, Rennes, Athens, Castlebar and Caracas, and won many awards.

== Early life ==
Since his early years he has been interested in poetry. At the age of 20 he won a countrywide recitation competition. Gifted with a very strong voice and a good diction he started an acting career at the theatre in his hometown and then moved to the capital city of Poland, Warsaw.

== Musical career ==
In 1965 he met Tadeusz Nalepa, with whom he created the band "Blackout". After two years of playing together he split with the "Blackout" and started playing with band "Bizony" (eng. "Bisons"). As a vocalist with this band he changed his name, stage appearance and recorded his big holiday hit song "Spacer Dziką Plażą" (eng. "Walking on a Wild Beach").

He was aiming into a more ambitious repertoire and in 1968 he appeared at the Opole music festival with the song "To Ziemia" ("It's Earth"), winning the journalists' prize. In 1973 he won another award performing "Jaskółka Uwięziona" (eng. "Imprisoned swallow") at the Opole festival.

Since 1970 he started acting only as soloist. He was singing in many festivals in Poland, and abroad winning prizes.

Because of his "Jesus-like-look" image (he has long hair, a beard and always wears a cross necklace), and liberty-themed songs, he experienced problems with the communist government which often cut off his appearances on TV, and censored his lyrics.

== Moving to the USA and further career ==
Stan Borys has always been fascinated with the United States, and finally in 1975, after several attempts and going through obstacles created by the government, under the pretense of going on an artist exchange, he managed to relocate permanently to the US.

On the other side of the Atlantic, he continued his musical career and started singing at various music clubs, working with Polish and American artists and polishing his English. Despite being thousands of miles away from Poland, he cherished his love for Polish poetry, which he promoted in his radio program in Chicago. In 1983, celebrating the 100th anniversary of C.K. Norwid's (a Polish poet) death during the World Norwid Conference held at the University of Illinois in Chicago, he directed and starred in the theater performance "Norwid".

His acting and vocal talent led to acting roles in other plays e.g. "The good Woman of Setzuan", "Polish Bethlehem".

He was married several times. His third wife was Agata Pilitowska, is a Polish actress who lives in Toronto.

== Visiting Poland ==
After 1989 he started visiting Poland again. In 1991 he performed at the Opole and Sopot festivals, and played Jean Valjean in the musical Les Misérables.

In 1998 he recorded a new album "Niczyj" (eng. "Nobody's") with several well-known international artists as well as performed on tour in Canada, and throughout the US. The album had not been available in Poland until 2004.

Stan Borys performed during the celebrations of the Polish accession to the European Union on April 30, 2004.

The same year he took part in some charity concerts.

Because of many performances in Poland Stan Borys has now a house near Warsaw. In the USA he lives near Death Valley, where as he says he has a good atmosphere for his work.

== Trivia ==
Stan Borys practices yoga as well as meditation techniques and breathing exercises, which helps him in his vocal performances.

He is a fan of muscle cars. His first automobile after moving to the United States was a Pontiac sports car. Currently he drives a Nissan Z.

== Discography ==
- (with Blackout) Studnia bez wody ("Well without water")
- (with Bizony) To ziemia (1968) ("It's Earth")
- Krzyczę przez sen (1970) ("Screaming in one's sleep")
- (with Niebiesko-Czarni) Naga (1972) ("Naked")
- Szukam przyjaciela (1974) ("Looking for a friend")
- Portret ("Portrait")
- Piszę pamiętnik artysty (1983) ("I'm writing artist's diary")
- Niczyj (1998) ("Nobody's")
- (with Imię Jego 44) Znieczulica (2007) ("Callousness")
- Piszę pamiętnik artysty – Hańba temu, kto o tym źle myśli (2010) ("I'm writing artist's diary – Disgrace to anyone who thinks wrong about it")

=== Compilations ===
- The Best of Stan Borys (1991)
- Złote przeboje (Platynowa kolekcja) (1999) ("Golden hits (Platinum collection)")
- Idę drogą nieznaną (Złota kolekcja) (2002) ("I am walking unknown path (Platinum collection)")
- Jaskółka uwięziona (Perły polskie) (2003) ("Imprisoned swallow (Polish pearls)")
