= Kazimierz Rudzki =

Polish actor and theatre director

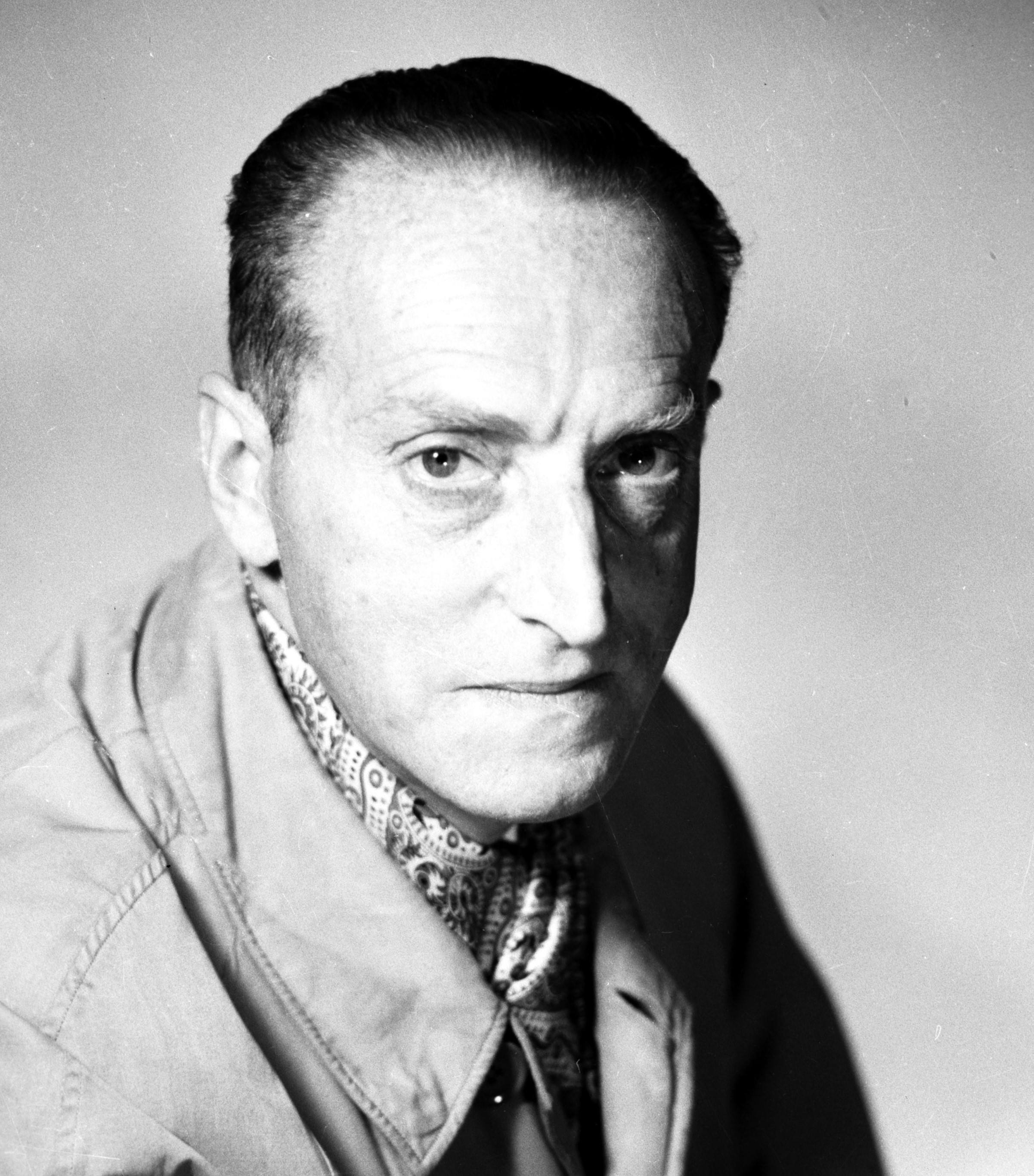
- Born: 6 January 1911; Warsaw, Congress Poland
- Died: 2 February 1976 (aged 65); Warsaw, Polish People's Republic
- Awards: Order of Polonia Restituta; Medal of the 10th Anniversary of People's Poland; Badge of the 1000th Anniversary of the Polish State; Badge of Honor "For Merit to Warsaw"

Kazimierz Rudzki (6 January 1911, in Warsaw, Poland – 2 February 1976, in Warsaw) was a Polish stage and film actor, theatre director.

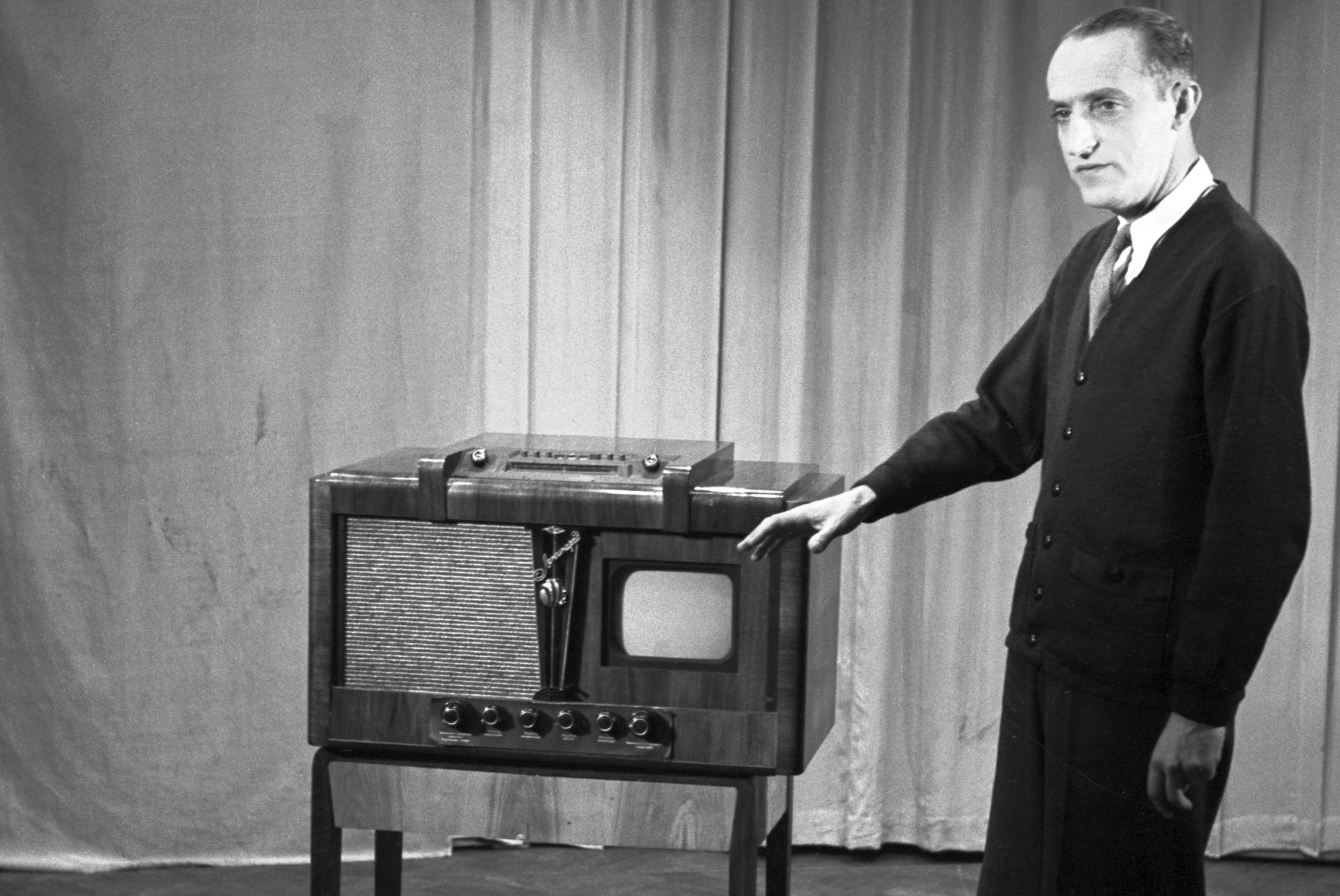
Rudzki presents the "Leningrad" television set, March 12, 1954

Studied directing at Państwowy Instytut Sztuki Teatralnej. Actor of Syrena Theatre (also director), National Theatre and Współczesny Theatre. Popular presenter on Polish Radio and Polish Television, compère of satirical theatres (cabarets): Kabaret Szpak, Kabaret Wagabunda, Kabaret Pod Egidą and others. Professor at Państwowa Wyższa Szkoła Teatralna.

== Selected filmography ==
- Eroica (1958)
- Głos z tamtego świata (1962)
- Pierwszy dzień wolności (1964)
- Marysia i Napoleon (1966)
- Jak rozpętałem drugą wojnę światową (1969)
- Nie lubię poniedziałku (1971)

=== TV series ===
- Wojna domowa (1965–66)

=== TV movie ===
- Awatar czyli zamiana dusz (1964)
