= Kabaret Tey =

Polish cabaret

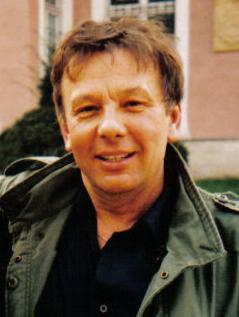
Zenon Laskowik

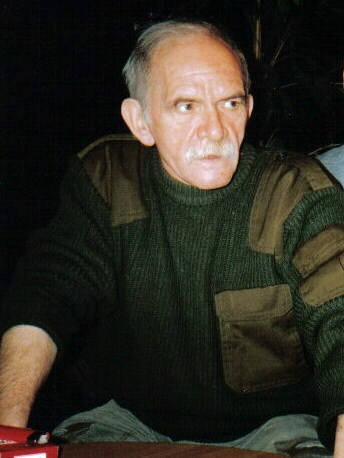
Bohdan Smoleń

Kabaret Tey was one of the most popular Polish cabarets in the 1970s and 1980s.

The word "tey" means "you" in the Poznań dialect.

== History ==
Founded in the mid-1960s as Klops by Zenon Laskowik, Krzysztof Jaślar and Aleksander Gołębiowski, on 17 September 1971 it changed its name to Kabaret Tey. Popular performers included Bohdan Smoleń (joined in 1977), Jadwiga Żywczak Marian Pogasz, Rudi Schuberth Janusz Rewiński, Grażyna Łobaszewska, Zbigniew Górny, Zbigniew Wodecki and Małgorzata Ostrowska, with music written by Włodzimierz Korcz (author of Żeby Polska była Polską, the informal anthem of Solidarity). The most popular of these were Laskowik and Smoleń, who often performed as a team.

The cabaret style relied heavily on improvisation. Its first significant award was the satirical Szpilki magazine's Opolska Złota Szpilka (the Opole Golden Pin) award at the National Festival of Polish Song in Opole in 1973 in the "Best Kabaret" category. This award also did much to popularize the cabaret. From 1977 the group worked with Polish national television (Telewizja Polska). As the communist system of the People's Republic of Poland began to wind down, so did Kabaret Tey, whose career was very much built on parodying the existing political system and communist reality. The group had another successful performance in Opole in 1980, and toured both Poland and some other countries. In 1984 it changed its name to Teyatr. Its last performance in Poland took place in 1987 and the last performance for Polonia (Polish diaspora in the United States and Canada) took place in 1988.

== Reception ==
Kabaret Tey was one of the most popular Polish cabarets in the 1970s and 1980s. Its fame was such that in the mid-1980s, it became one of the main icons associated with Poznań, and some of the jokes and phrases coined in it have entered the Polish language and culture.

The group texts became more political in the aftermath of the rise of Solidarity and introduction of the martial law in Poland in 1981.

== Performers ==
=== Artists ===
- Zenon Laskowik
- Krzysztof Jaślar
- Aleksander Maria Gołębiowski
- Janusz Rewiński
- Bohdan Smoleń
- Rudi Schuberth
- Zbigniew Górny

=== Associates ===
- Krystyna Tkacz
- Grzegorz Warchoł
- Zbigniew Wodecki
- Barbara Gołaska
- Tadeusz Osipowicz
- Jerzy Garniewicz
- Wojciech Michalski
- Jerzy Banaś
- Grażyna Łobaszewska
- Małgorzata Ostrowska
- Józef Zembrzuski – "Żużu"
- Marian Pogasz
- Michał Grudziński
- Piotr Sowiński
- Tadeusz Wojtych
- Małgorzata Bratek
- Jacek Różański
- Aleksandra Jursza
