= Pravda (Lithuania) =

Lithuanian youth magazine

Pravda (means "truth" in Russian) was a monthly free Lithuanian youth magazine about urban lifestyle, culture, music, art, fashion and other significant topics. Pravda was founded by former editors of K magazine in 2004. The first issue was published in November 2004. Since the first one, every issue has had a specific topic that is revealed and/or discussed in the magazine's articles. The magazine was discontinued in 2010 after an attempt to move into digital format.

The content of Pravda was in Lithuanian. Each issue consisted of "The monthly truth" according to the month's topic; articles about what is going on, where and when; clubbing recommendations; music, theatre, books and movie guide; cuisine; city block review; an interesting dream, etc.

In 2010 the magazine was closed but after a brief hiatus, the same year the magazine was relaunched as an e-zine. Currently their website, pravda.lt, is discontinued.

During 2005-2011 the magazine issued the Pravda Newcomer Awards in various categories.
