= Ukochany kraj =

1953 Polish poem written by Konstanty Ildefons Gałczyński

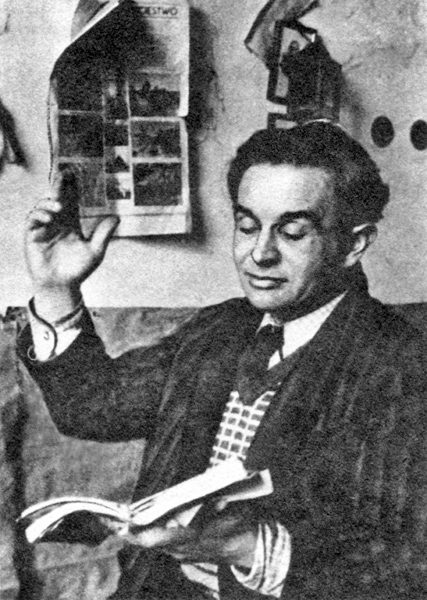
Konstanty Ildefons Gałczyński

„Ukochany kraj“ ("Beloved Country"), also known by its incipit „Wszystko tobie, ukochana ziemio“ ("Everything For You, Beloved Land"), is a poem written by Polish poet Konstanty Ildefons Gałczyński in 1953 and put to music as a song (in several versions) by Tadeusz Sygietyński. It was probably the most widespread propaganda song in Communist Poland. Together with other poets and composers, Gałczyński yielded under the pressure of authorities and wrote several things in the style of socialist realism, including this "song for the masses" (pieśń masowa). Appealing to patriotism, the song calls for building a new Socialist Poland:

Wszystko tobie ukochana ziemio,
Nasze myśli wciąż przy tobie są,
Tobie lotnik tryumf nad przestrzenią,
A robotnik daje dwoje rąk.

Translation:

Everything for you, beloved land,
Our thoughts are with you all the time,
The pilot triumphs over the space for you,
And the worker gives you both hands.

It is claimed that the song was considered as a replacement of "Dąbrowski's Mazurka" ("Poland Is Not Yet Lost") as the national anthem of the Polish People's Republic.

Reminiscent of this and other songs of the Socialist past, Janusz Józefowicz directed the musical play Beloved Country... or Polish People's Republic in Songs (pl) premiered in Studio Buffo in 2001.
