= Magda Piskorczyk =

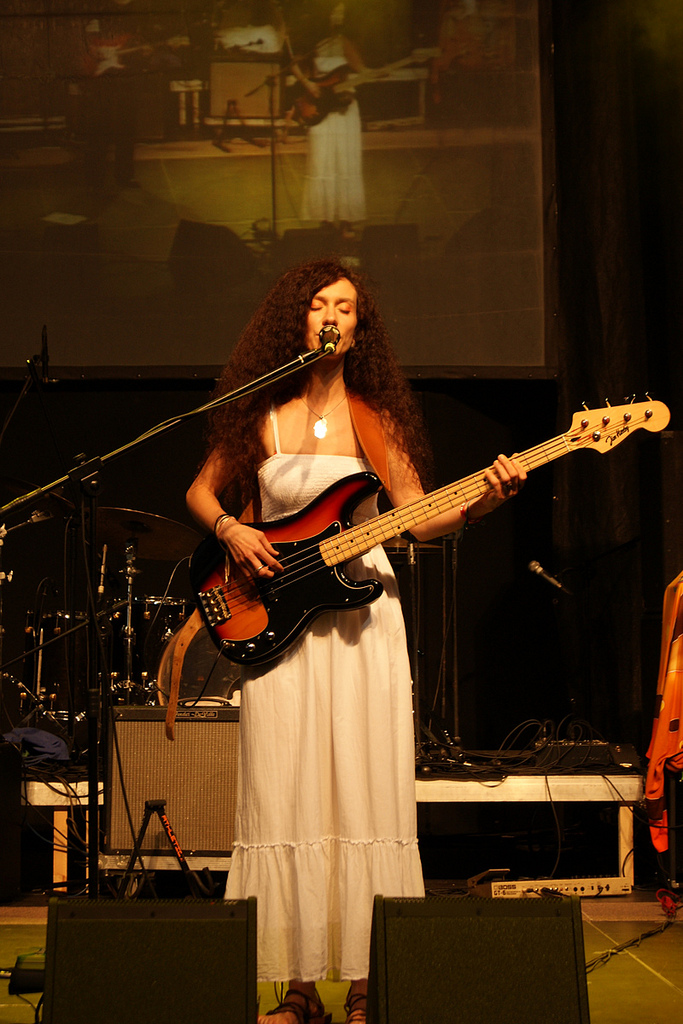
- Piskorczyk at the XIX Olsztyńskie Noce Bluesowe (2010)

Background information
- Born: Magda Piskorczyk
- Genres: blues, jazz, gospel, soul, funk, world music, rock
- Occupation: Singer-songwriter
- Instruments: vocals, acoustic guitar, bass guitar, electric guitar, percussion, kazoo
- Years active: 2001–present
- Label: Play On
- Website: Magda MAGIC Piskorczyk

Magda Piskorczyk is a Polish singer and multi-instrumentalist, composer and musical arranger. Piskorczyk has twice been a semi-finalist at the International Blues Challenge in Memphis, Tennessee, United States. She has been selected seven times in 10 years s 'Vocalist of the Year' by readers of the "Twój Blues" magazine.

== Biography ==
Piskorczyk began singing in her early childhood. After a brief foray into rock music, she developed her present repertoire, which includes blues, gospel, jazz and related genres with near-acoustic roots.

== Musical work ==
Piskorczyk's music includes her own arrangements of standards from the soul, blues, funk, rock, jazz and gospel music idioms, as well as her own compositions inspired by these trends.

Much of Piskorczyk's career has been spent performing at festivals and as part of an ensemble of musicians on various recordings and albums culminating in a namesake band called Magda.

She's been selected as Vocalist of the Year by readers of Blues Quarterly for years 2003, 2004, 2006, 2009, 2011, 2012 and 2013.

- In 2001 debut at the Autumn Blues Festival in Bialystok, where her song "Sexy Mama" which won the First Prize.
- In 2002, Piskorczyk co-created the Terraplane trio, and performed in duos with Michał Kielak (harmonica), Arkadiusz Osenkowski (sax), Marek Kapłon (guitar), Ola Siemieniuk (guitar) and Karolina Koriat (vocals).
- In 2003 and 2005 she performed at the Big Stage of the Rawa Blues Festival.
- In 2005, participated in the International Blues Challenge in Memphis, reached the semi-finals and received warm commentary from the judges.
- Also in 2005, Piskorczyk worked on an album titled Blues Traveling which was released under jazz composer Michael Urbaniak.
- In 2007 Piskorczyk began work on a special program titled In the Tribute to Mahalia Jackson, which contains interpretations of works known from the records of the Queen of Gospel Music.
- In March 2008, the first live album of Piskorczyk entitled Magda Live was published by Artgraff. A year later the album was nominated for a Fryderyk Award in the Album of the Year in the Blues category.
- In 2009, the artist was invited to the international Konoba band, performing traditional West African music. In this group she sang, played bass and acoustic guitar and percussion instruments. The cooperation lasted until 2012.
- In the spring of 2010, Piskorczyk made his first tour of Scandinavia. In mid 2010 a record was released a year earlier in Tarnobrzeg with Swedish vocalist, guitarist and composer Slidin 'Slim, titled Live at Satyrblues. On this album you can hear Aleksandra Siemieniuk (guitars) and Grzegorz Zawiliński (drums and percussion instruments), who then formed the core of the band Magda.
- In March 2011 she performed in Oslo and Notodden, Norway, among others by Rita Engedalen. She represented Hohner at the Musikmesse in Frankfurt. The song I'd Rather Go Blind was released on two compilations in Singapore and Malaysia. Within a dozen or so months, the EQU Music release from Singapore has released 6 more songs with songs performed by the Polish vocalist: Darkness on the Delta, Temptation, Work Song and I Can Got The Beatles. British magazine Blues Matters published an interview with Piskorczyk conducted by musicians.
- In autumn 2012 she gave a series of concerts in Taiwan, where she performed at the 9th Blues Bash Festival in Taipei, invited by the blues association. Portal Polska ma sens published a comprehensive text on Piskorczyk, entitled: "A Polish lady who feels the blues".

Piskorczyk teaches music under a program she developed called Magda Piskorczyk Masterclass at the Ochota Culture Center in Warsaw and since 2014 she has been the Artistic Director of the Blues Workshop on Bobrow.

She is also a member of the ZPAV Academy of Phonography.

She cooperates, records or performs with other bands, including Blues Flowers, Engerling and Konoba, and has performed with many solo musicians, including Wojciech Karolak, Leszek Winder, Jerzy Styczynski, Leszek Cichoński, Bob Margolyn, Billy Gibson, Seckou Keita, Rita Engedalen, Bob Brozman, Greg Szłapczyński and Slidin 'Slim.

== Musical influences ==
Gospel music is one of Piskorczyk's greatest musical loves. Among the performers of this genre, she mostly appreciates the work of Mahalia Jackson. She was amongst various artists performing gospel standards in Poland, Germany, Hungary, England (at the City Sings Gospel in Liverpool) and France (at the Blues Sur Seine).

Piskorczyk is very interested in ethnic music from various parts of the world, which is also increasingly included in her repertoire. She sings mainly in English, sometimes in Polish, but also in other languages, such as Spanish, Creole or African languages such as Bambara and Tamaszek.

== Team ==
Piskorczyk (vocals, arrangements, compositions, acoustic, electric and bass guitar and percussion instruments) plays with an ensemble composed of:

- Aleksandra Siemieniuk - acoustic and electric guitar;
- Bartosz Kazek - drums.

Extended composition and special projects, e.g. gospel:

- Stanislaw Witta - piano, Hammond organ;
- Jacek Cichocki - piano, Hammond organ;
- Roman Ziobro - bass, bass guitar;
- Marcin Jahr - drums;
- Bogumił Romanowski - drums.

Previous team members:

- Adam Rozenman - percussion instruments;
- Grzegorz Zawiliński - percussion instruments;
- Arkadiusz Osenkowski - saxophone;
- Maksymilian Ziobro - drums.

== Discography ==
- Magda Piskorczyk - Mahalia, Artgraff (2011)
- Magda Piskorczyk feat. Billy Gibson - Afro Groove, Artgraff (2011), BSMF Records Japan (2011)
- Magda Piskorczyk & Slidin 'Slim - Live at Satyrblues, Artgraff (2010)
- Magda Piskorczyk - Magda Live, Artgraff (2008)
- Magda Piskorczyk - Blues Traveling, MTJ (2005)
- Magda Piskorczyk - Make Your Spirit Fly, Demo (2002)

=== Guest vocalist and special projects ===
- Blues Menu Not the Blues itself, (2013)
- Magda Piskorczyk Master Class, Ochota Culture Center (2012)
- Antoni Krupa - Amela. Blues with blown hair in the wind, Radio Kraków (2012)
- J.J.Band - Blues. J.Jandand friends play Tadeusz Nalepa (2010)
- Blues Flowers - Tasty !, Flower Records (2008)
- Blues Flowers - Bluesmen, Flower Records (2005)
- Patients on the blues sing songs by Sławom Wierzcholski, Omerta Art (2004)
- Blues Flowers - Silent Leader, Flower Records (2003)
- Blues Flowers - I will not be a good girl (single), Flower Records (2003)
- Blues Flowers - Let's be like kids (single), Flower Records (2003)
- The Jam Session Band One Night At Satyrblues Live, OKO (2003)

=== Compilations ===
- Jazz Unlimited Vol.3, audiophile 2CD, track "Temptation", Singapore (2012)
- Great Songwriters' Songbook, CD, track "Temptation", Singapore (2012)
- Jazz Bar, Song "Work Song", Singapore (2012)
- Acoustic Edition II, audiophile CD, track "Darkness on the Delta", Singapore (2012)
- Jazz Unlimited, 2CD, track "I'd Rather go Blind", Singapore (2011)
- Jazz Addiction, audiophile CD, song "I'd Rather go Blind", Singapore (2011)
- Smooth jazz in Polish, 3CD, track I will not be a good girl, MTJ (2010)
- 17 International Gastroblues Festival DVD, Hungary (2009)
- The Anthology of Polish Blues 2, songs: Never Make Your Move Too Soon and Blues Flowers: I will write you down in the diary, Polish Blues Association and 4evermusic (2009)
- Blues sur Seine Fete Ses 10 Ans, Walking Blues, ed. Blues sur Seine, France (2008)
- Anthology of Polish Blues, songs of: All of Me and Muddy Water Blues, Polish Blues Association and 4evermusic (2008)
- Blues sur Seine, 8eme edition, Help Me song, ed. Blues sur Seine, France (2006)

== International festivals ==
Piskorczyk has been a guest at many international festivals, including:

- Blue Wave Festival, Rugen Island, Germany (2014)
- Vienna Blues Spring Festival, Austria (2014)
- Chemnitzer Stadtfest, Chemnitz, Germany (2013)
- Bluesovy Podzimek, Holešov, Czech Republic (2013)
- Prerov Jazz Festival, Prerov, Czech Republic (2009, 2013)
- Southern Rock and Blues Festival, Kolin, Czech Republic (2013)
- Old Jazz Meeting, Złota Tarka, Iława (2013)
- Głogów Jazz Meetings, Glogow (2013)
- Torun Blues Meeting, Torun (2013)
- Chemnitzer Blues Festival, Germany (2013)
- Blues Bash, Taipei, Taiwan (2012)
- Blues au chateau Festival, La Cheze, France (2012)
- Picnic Country, Dąbrowa Górnicza (2012)
- Bluesfest Eutin / Bluesbaltica Festival, Eutin, Germany (2011)
- Suwalki Blues Festival, Suwalki (2011)
- Plus Tennis Music Festival, Szczecin (2010)
- Dusty Road Blues Festival, Tidaholm, Sweden (2010)
- Bluescamp Festival, Fredrikstad, Norway (2010)
- Harmonica Bridge, Torun and Bydgoszcz (2010)
- Satyrblues, Tarnobrzeg (2003, 2009, 2010)
- Trossinger Blues Fabrik, Trossingen, Germany (2009)
- City Sings Gospel, Liverpool, UK (2008)
- Angels, Bieszczady (2008)
- Bluestures (Blues Top), Chorzów and Zakopane (2007)
- Blues Goes East, Karlsruhe, Germany (2007)
- Bluezzfest, Bulgaria (2006)
- Blues Sur Seine, France (2006)
- Jimiway Blues Festival, Ostrów Wielkopolski (2002, 2006)
- Resonator Festival, Sulingen, Germany (2005, 2006)
- Dobrofest, Trnava, Slovakia (2005)
- Potsdam Bluesfestival, Germany (2004)
- Berlin Bluesfestival, Germany (2004)
- Blues Alive, Šumperk, Czech Republic (2002)
