= Kabaret Olgi Lipińskiej =

Kabaret Olgi Lipińskiej is a long series of TV shows directed by Warsaw theatre director and satirical artist Olga Lipińska. The cabaret was inaugurated in 1974 (under a different name) and subsequently closed in 1984 under the military rule in Communist Poland. It was re-established soon after the collapse of the Soviet empire in 1990, and broadcast until 2005 five to six times a year, for about half an hour. It was taken off the air again, this time for five years due to criticism in the press, and brought back in June 2010 by the TV station TVP2.

== Background ==
Olga Lipińska began producing satirical programs for Telewizja Polska in the late 1960s. The Gallux Show (1970–1974) was followed by her first true Kabaret Olgi Lipińskiej, produced in 1975–1977: a series consisting of 10 episodes entitled the Cabaret's just playing (Właśnie leci kabarecik). It was aired by the TV block of entertainment called Only on Sunday (Tylko w niedzielę). Between 1977 and 1981 she produced Curtain Up (Kurtyna w górę; 18 episodes), a widely popular program based on absurd and surreal humour featuring renowned artists such as Piotr Fronczewski, Wojciech Pokora, and Bohdan Łazuka. One of its best-remembered lines (from a restaurant sketch featuring Jan Kobuszewski) was: "Who ordered Russian [pierogi]?" Answer: "Nobody. They came on their own." – It resulted in an official protest by the Soviet embassy in 1978, followed by secret police questioning. Lipińska was accused of political provocation and suspended from work for eight months; her producer, downgraded to a lower position; and the censor in charge, officially reprimanded. In the subsequent years, the cabaret (inspired by satirical writings of Gałczyński) was a door-opener for many stage artists including Barbara Wrzesińska, Jan Kobuszewski, and Marek Kondrat.

== More controversy ==
Kabaret Olgi Lipińskiej was reactivated by the Polish TV station TVP2 on 11 June 2010 and almost immediately became the source of new controversy. It was aired just before the elections, although Lipińska insisted that its theme was non-political and focused on different types of voters instead (i.e. the Parsley or beets episode). Some candidates for office denounced it. Other viewers urged the public: "Please, do not vote for the Beetroot!"

From January 1993 to July 1996, 21 recorded episodes of Lipińska's cabaret dating back 30 years were released on a series of seven DVDs, each consisting of a group of broadcasts. Since 2008, they have been distributed in Poland by Sony Music Entertainment.
