= Marcin Wolski =

Polish writer, journalist and satirist

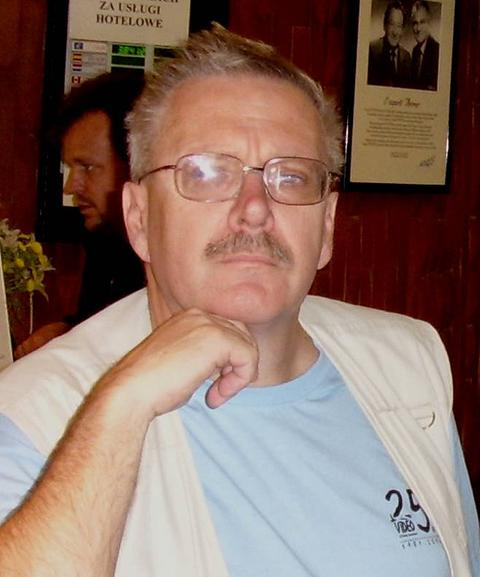
Marcin Wolski

Marcin Wolski (born 22 July 1947 in Łódź) is a Polish writer, journalist and satirist.

Member of the communist PZPR party from 1975 to 1981.

As a journalist, he writes for Wprost, Gazeta Polska and Tygodnik Solidarność. Many of his novels mix elements of science fiction, fantasy and political fiction and he was nominated for the Janusz A. Zajdel Award 3 times.
