= Żeby Polska była Polską =

1976 Polish protest song

"Żeby Polska była Polską" (Let Poland be Poland, or – less commonly, For Poland to be Poland) is one of the best-known Polish protest songs written in 1976 by the Polish singer-songwriter Jan Pietrzak, with music by Włodzimierz Korcz. The song became an informal anthem of the Solidarity period in the People's Republic of Poland. From June 1976 protests against the Soviet-style communism imposed in Poland, all the way to the collapse of the Warsaw Pact in the 1990s, it was the symbol of the political opposition to the Communist regime. The song was widely popular among the members of Solidarity (NSZZ Solidarność), and won first-prize at the 1981 National Festival of Polish Song in Opole. It is one of Pietrzak's best-known works.

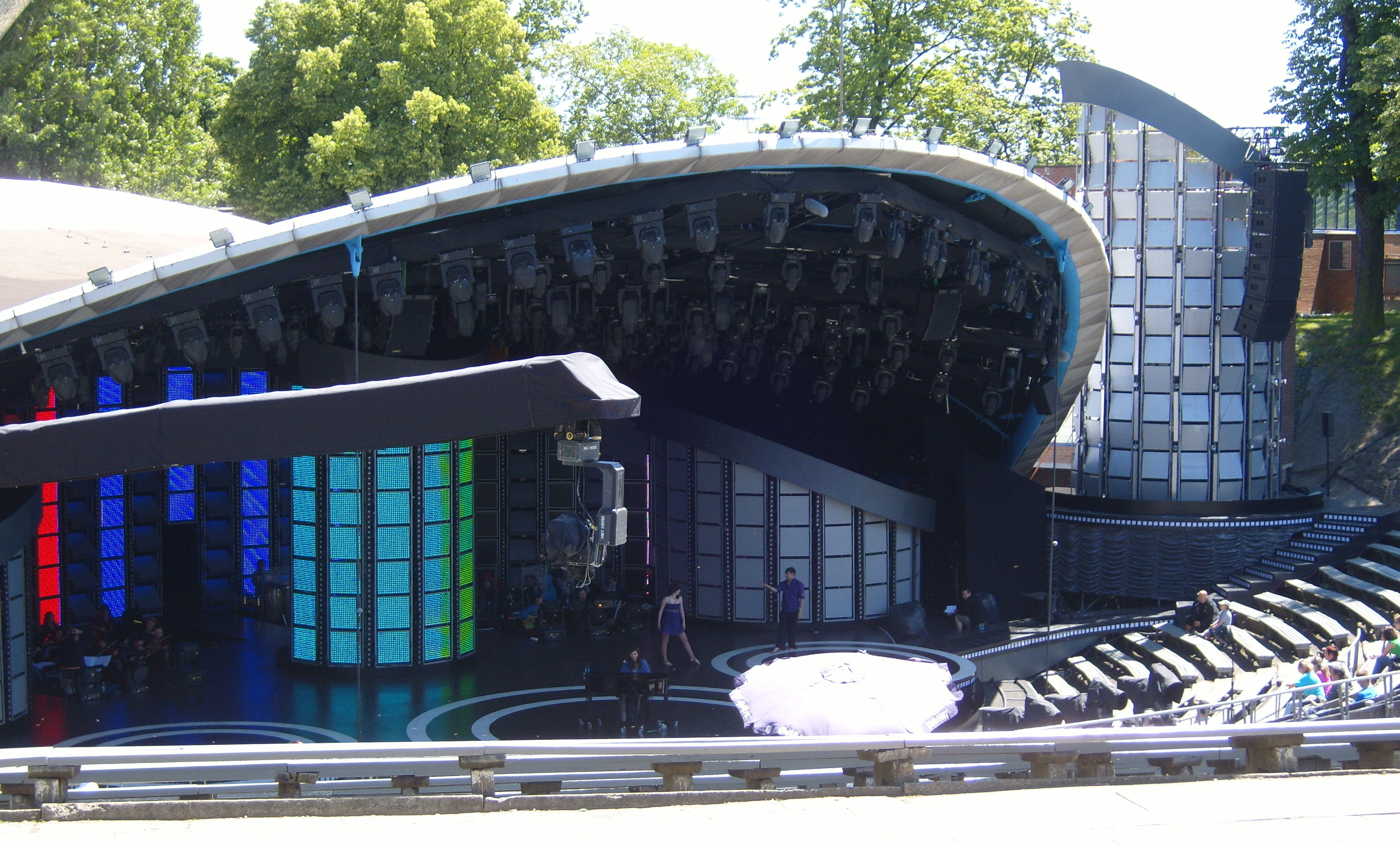
Amphitheater in Opole, main stage of the National Festival of Polish Song

== Background ==
As Jan Pietrzak notes, he rarely wrote such serious pieces, but he was motivated to do so in 1976, after the workers' protests in the Ursus factory. Music was composed by Włodzimierz Korcz, while an unconfirmed anecdote suggests that the title-phrase was coined by Agnieszka Osiecka.

Pietrzak performed the song at the stage of his own political Kabaret pod Egidą as an ending theme. When the censors forbade the Cabaret to do an encore of it, it became habitual that it was sung by the audience. It gained popularity in the following years, with people copying it on tape recorders, and – during the emergence of Solidarity in 1980, it was often played from the workers radio stations and internal speakers. In June 1981 Pietrzak performed the song at the 19th National Festival of Polish Song in Opole, winning first-prize awards for the "hit song of the season" and "the audience choice."

The communist authorities tried to repress the song, which is one of the reasons why, despite numerous performances – some gathering thousands of people on the streets, all chanting – there are no recordings from that period. One of the largest public performances took place in Warsaw, at the crossroads of major streets (Aleje Jerozolimskie and Marszałkowska Street). For his support of the anti-communist opposition, Pietrzak was arrested in the aftermath of the introduction of the martial law in Poland in 1981.

== Cultural significance ==
In spite of its mainly historical context, the song resonated with the millions of people in communist Poland, particularly as a dream of freedom. It became one of the anthems of Solidarity. As Józef Tischner noted: "The solemn words of the song tell of the everlasting and indomitable Polish spirit". Eventually however it lost popularity, due to critical voices among some of the Solidarity advisors that the references contained in it were "nationalistic, chauvinistic and backward". Nonetheless, the song is still popular, and is often performed to a standing audience.

The song inspired Ronald Reagan to name his own speech after it: Let Poland be Poland. He also presented Pietrzak with an engraved plaque bearing that title. The song was also quoted by Queen Elizabeth II during her speech in the Polish parliament.

== See also ==
- Mury
