= Jonasz Kofta =

Polish songwriter and poet

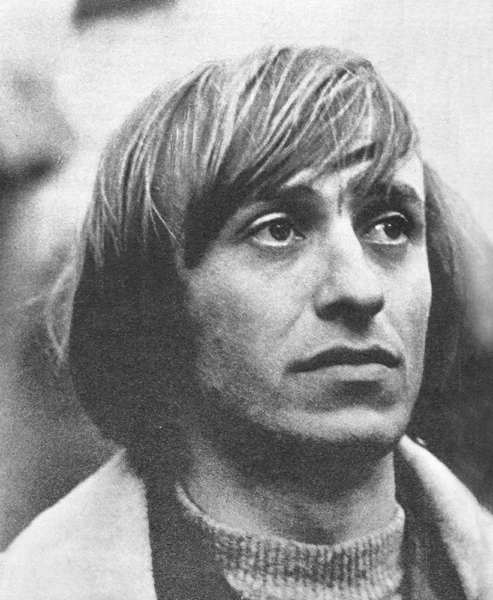
- Portrait of Kofta, 1972
- Born: Janusz Kofta; November 28, 1942; Misotsch, Reichskommissariat Ukraine, German Reich
- Died: April 19, 1988 (aged 45); Warsaw, Warsaw Voivodeship, Polish People's Republic
- Resting place: Powązki Military Cemetery
- Education: Academy of Fine Arts, Warsaw
- Children: Piotr Kofta
- Writing career
- Language: Polish
- Years active: 1961-1988
- Notable awards: Cross of Merit

Jonasz Kofta, real name: Janusz Kofta (28 November 1942 – 19 April 1988) was a Polish songwriter, poet, actor, and singer.

== Life and career ==
Kofta was born in Mizocz, Volhynia on 28 November 1942.

The Kofta family came to Warsaw after the Second World War and later lived in Wrocław and Poznań. Jonasz's father was a Jew. In 1961 Kofta received his Matura in High School of Arts in Poznań and began to study painting in Warsaw. By that time he had begun to write poetry and cabaret numbers. In 1962, together with Adam Kreczmar and Jan Pietrzak, he opened the student cabaret club Hybrydy in Warsaw. In 1964 he became the literary director of the cabaret.

Starting in 1966 his poems, satires and song lyrics were published in newspapers. From 1968 to 1980 he often worked with Kreczmar and Pietrzak at Pod Egida, one of the most popular Polish cabarets. There he gained a reputation for being one of the most poetic and most politically important songwriters in Poland.

In the 1980s he had continued poor health, including cancer. He died after choking to death on his meal. He died in Warsaw on 19 April 1988.
