= Sung poetry =

Music genre

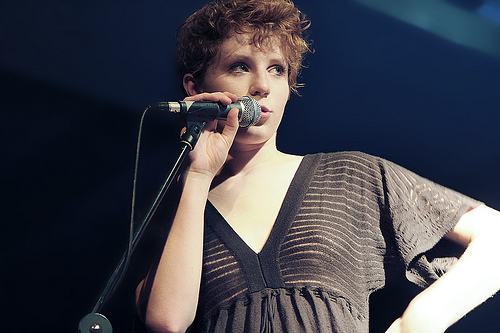
Alina Orlova at a concert

Sung poetry is a broad and imprecise music genre widespread in European countries, such as Poland and the Baltic States, especially Poland and Lithuania, to describe songs consisting of a poem (most often a ballad) and music written especially for that text. The compositions usually feature a delicate melody and scarce musical background, often comprising a guitar or piano. Usually used are arranged pieces of poetry accompanied by the traditional instruments of the bards: guitar, lute, Celtic harp, zither, Kanklės, violin or piano. This genre is represented by many famous artists whose activities are not limited to this. Some sung poetry performers are singer-songwriters; others use known, published poems, or collaborate with contemporary writers. Artists of sung poetry include people of various occupations usually with little or no particular music education, as well as stage actors.

Notable Polish and Lithuanian artists include Sanah, Ewa Demarczyk, Edyta Geppert, Marek Grechuta, Czesław Niemen, Jacek Kaczmarski, Magda Umer, Vytautas Kernagis, Kostas Smoriginas, Ieva Narkutė, Alina Orlova.

== See also ==
- Art song
- Bard (Soviet Union)
