= Mała Armia Janosika =

Polish musical group

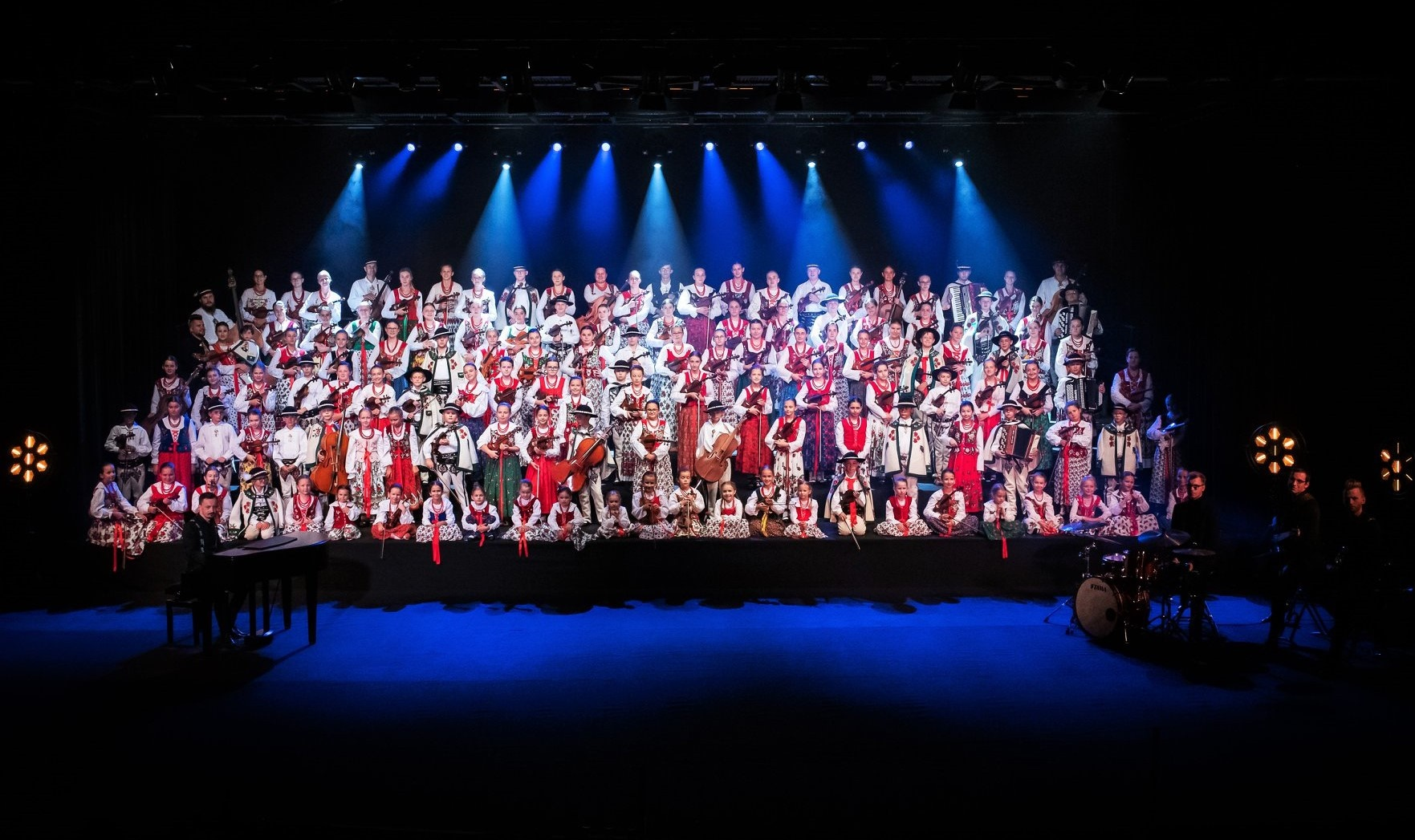

Background information
- Origin: Raba Wyżna, Poland
- Genres: Folk music, popular music
- Years active: 2015–present
- Labels: Sony Music Entertainment Poland, QM Music
- Members: Damian Pałasz (violin, conductor, founder); Rafał Nowak (keyboard instruments, accordion); Wojtek Czyrnek (electric and acoustic guitar); Mariusz Pacyga (bass guitar); Grzegorz Jaromin (drums)

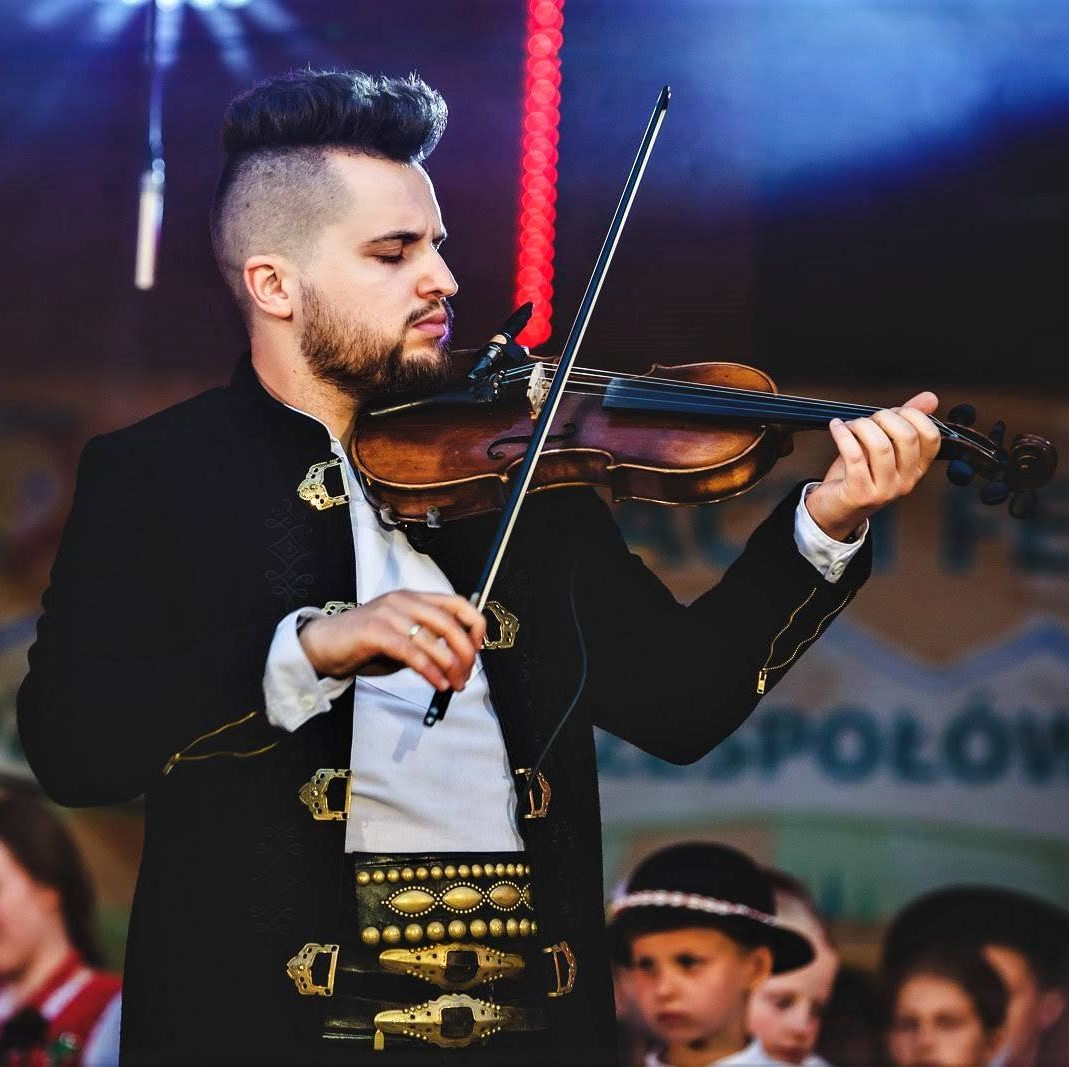
Founder of the band Damian Pałasz

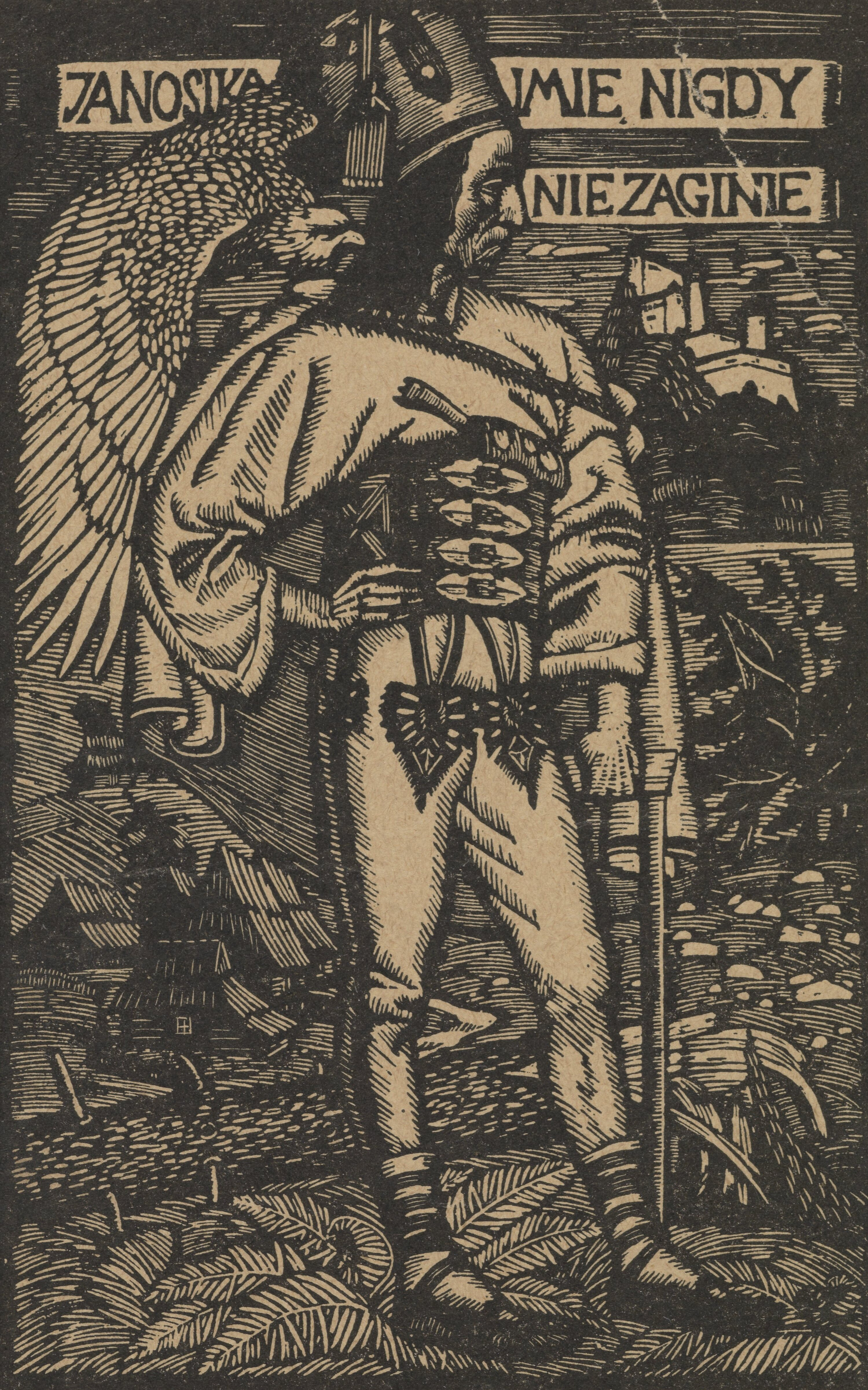
Janosik - woodcut by Władysław Skoczylas

Mała Armia Janosika is a Polish music band and artistic group, which performs folk music inspired by the culture of Podhale. It was formed in 2015 on the initiative o Damian Pałasz, a violinist from Raba Wyżna.

Mała Armia Janosika consists of more than 300 members (ranging in age from two to seventy years old) and is the largest Goral band in Poland. The group brings together children and youth from Raba Wyżna and its surroundings, united by a shared passion for regional music and the traditions of the Podhale region. The band's headquarters are in Raba Wyżna, where rehearsals and preparations for artistic performances occur regularly. In 2018, the Mała Armia Janosika in time National Independence Day was invited to participate in the ceremonial Concert for Independence on the occasion of the 100th anniversary of Poland regaining independence. They played, among others White Roses (Białe Róże, or "Rozkwitały Pąki Białych Róż"). They performed at the opening of the 2023 European Games in Kraków (piece "Tak smakuje życie"). In 2024 the band gave a concert in St. Peter's Square in the Vatican City, where they played among others Polish version Lord, You Have Come to the Lakeshore; Black Madonna; and also the title song from the series Janosik.

== History ==
=== Band name and lineup ===
Janosik's Little Army - "Mała Armia" (Little Army) is used to refer to the size of the band, which is predominantly made up of children, while the word "Janosik" (a legendary Carpathian robber) is meant to evoke associations with Gorals folklore. The band regularly goes on concert tours, performing throughout Poland and participating in events of a folk, holiday, religious, and patriotic nature.

In 2019, a musical section joined Mała Armia Janosika, forming an instrumental ensemble consisting of:

- Rafał "Piętaszek" Nowak – keyboards, accordion
- Wojtek Czyrnek – electric and acoustic guitar
- Mariusz Pacyga – bass guitar
- Grzegorz Jaromin – percussion instruments

=== 2015–2017 ===
On March 15, 2015, the first recruitment for the band was announced, which initially operated under the name "Galicja Projekt". Twenty-five people living in Raba Wyżna and its surroundings applied for the project. After the recruitment period, all members began their first lessons in playing the violin and Podhale basses under the guidance of Damian Pałasz. On December 24, 2015, the band initiated the tradition of "Pasterki Góralskie" in the parish church in Raba Wyżna.

In January 2016, the band organized charity caroling concerts for the sick and poor, and in July, they produced a music video for the song "Siła jest w jedności" (English: "Strength is in Unity"), recorded for World Youth Days. The video was shot in the commune of Raba Wyżna, including at the monument of Pope John Paul II. On this occasion, the band also performed during World Youth Days in Krakow and in Raba Wyżna. Also in 2016, the second recruitment for the band was announced, increasing the group by another twenty-five members.

At the end of January 2017, members of Mała Armia Janosika performed during a solemn caroling concert in front of Cardinal Stanisław Dziwisz, who was then bidding farewell to his function as Metropolitan Archbishop of Krakow. In February, the third recruitment for the band was announced. As a result, Mała Armia Janosika grew by fifty new members. On May 7, 2017, a group of one hundred members performed during the parish feast in Raba Wyżna: the Holy Mass was celebrated by Cardinal Dziwisz.

In the summer of 2017, the band worked on a music video for a song titled "Modlę się o miłość" (English: "I Pray for Love"), in the making of which Damian Pałasz engaged actors Katarzyna Żak and Cezary Żak, as well as the Megitza Trio. In the autumn, Mała Armia Janosika performed during the Days of John Paul II in Krakow, at the John Paul II Center in Łagiewniki.

=== 2018 ===
In February 2018, the founder of Mała Armia Janosika, Damian Pałasz, was awarded the title of "Personality of the Year 2017" in the plebiscite held by Gazeta Krakowska. He secured the first place in the district stage and the second place in the regional stage. In March 2018, after another recruitment, the band increased its membership to one hundred and forty members. In April, Mała Armia Janosika won the plebiscite for the "Most Popular Children and Youth Band of the Podhale, Orava, Spisz, and Pieniny regions" in 2017.

In October 2018, a music video premiered to commemorate the centenary of Poland's regained independence. The video, titled "Białe róże" ("White Roses") and directed and produced by Pałasz, featured actors Katarzyna Żak and Piotr Cyrwus in leading roles. Within two months of its release on YouTube, the video was viewed over a million times, and by March 2021, it had garnered 4.2 million views. Shortly after the video's premiere, Mała Armia Janosika was invited to participate in the Concert for Independence (Polish: Koncert dla Niepodległej), held on November 10, 2018, at the National Stadium in Warsaw. The concert was broadcast by all Polish television stations, and the band performed on stage alongside artists such as Maryla Rodowicz, Krzysztof Cugowski, Ewa Farna, and Kamil Bednarek. During their solemn performance, Mała Armia Janosika presented a medley of legionnaire songs, accompanied by a symphony orchestra conducted by Grzegorz Urban. Among the songs performed were "Białe róże," "Wojenko, wojenko," "Szara piechota," "Przybyli ułani pod okienko," and "My, Pierwsza Brygada." The performance by Mała Armia Janosika was watched by 40,000 spectators at the stadium and 7 million viewers gathered in front of their televisions.

In November, the band performed during the visit of the President of the Republic of Poland, Andrzej Duda, to Podsarnie, presenting patriotic songs. On December 20, 2018, the first full-length album of Mała Armia Janosika, Kolędy i Pastorałki na góralską nutę (English: Carols and Pastorals in Highland Style), was released. The band embarked on a promotional concert tour covering the Małopolska and Podkarpacie regions.

=== 2019 ===
In 2019, Mała Armia Janosika began a series of concerts in various cities including Tarnów, Nowy Targ, Przemyśl, and Sanok. In March 2019, Damian Pałasz was named the "Personality of the Year 2018" in a competition organized by Dziennik Polski and Gazeta Krakowska, in the culture category, taking first place in the Nowy Targ district and second in the Lesser Poland Voivodeship. He was nominated for his contribution to regional culture. By autumn, the number of band members had grown to one hundred fifty.

On September 29, 2019, the group performed a concert at the John Paul II Center in Krakow, on the occasion of the twenty-fifth anniversary of the Agricultural Restructuring and Modernization Agency. On October 16, Mała Armia Janosika appeared in Wieliczka for "Papal Day," performing a repertoire commemorating the pontificate of John Paul II. Also in October, Pałasz and members of the band were awarded during the fourteenth edition of the FilmAT Festival in Warsaw. The group was honored for the best documentary film in the history and heritage category, as well as for the "patriotic values" of the music video – in both cases for "Białe róże" ("White Roses").

=== 2020–2021 ===
In February 2020, Mała Armia Janosika performed in front of President Andrzej Duda during his visit to Rabka-Zdroj. In March 2020, due to restrictions related to the coronavirus pandemic, the band decided to suspend their concert activities. During the spring, two music videos were recorded remotely ("Dni, których nie znamy," "Barka"). The second of these music videos had been viewed over three million times on YouTube by March 2021. In the spring and summer of 2020, Mała Armia Janosika participated in multiple programs on Polish Television: Teleexpress, Bądźmy razem w domu, Studio Raban, and Ziarno. The group also appeared on TVP Polonia, in TVP's news services, on Radio Plus, and in print media (Gość Niedzielny, Twoje Imperium).

On September 26, 2020, at the initiative of Damian Pałasz, the "First and Biggest Highland May Day in Poland" was organized in Raba Wyżna (on the occasion of the hundredth birthday of Pope John Paul II). The event was accompanied by honorary patronages, including those of Cardinal Stanisław Dziwisz and Marshal of the Małopolskie Voivodeship Witold Kozłowski. On October 18, 2020, Mała Armia Janosika performed during the concert "Wadowice, Where It All Began," organized by Polish Television.

On June 28, 2021, the premiere of the new album titled Jan Paweł II – Przyjaciel Podhalańskiej Ziemi (English: Jan Paweł II – Friend of the Podhale Land) took place. The album pays homage to the Polish pope and was released on the 101st anniversary of his birth. In July, the group appeared on stage during the celebrations of the "Second Largest Highland May Day in Poland." Damian Pałasz was the director and producer of the event. On August 21, 2021, Mała Armia Janosika performed a concert titled "Solidarity with Belarus," which took place in Częstochowa. The event was broadcast on TVP Polonia. Also, at the end of August, a concert of Mała Armia Janosika took place in Wolbrom, during which a total of one hundred and fifty artists performed on stage. On November 19, 2021, the band performed at the Kraków Philharmonic during the celebration of the Małopolska Festival. In the second half of December, Mała Armia Janosika was hosted at the Hungarian State Opera House in Budapest, where they also performed a concert. It was positively reviewed by the audience.

=== 2022 ===
On May 8, 2022, a delegation from Mała Armia Janosika participated in the ceremonial gala for the TVP Polonia Awards, presented "for merits to Poland and Poles outside the country." It was held at the Royal Castle in Warsaw and broadcast by Polish Television. At the end of the month, the band performed at the "Third Largest Highland May Day in Poland"; the event was produced by Damian Pałasz.

On October 13, 2022, the music video for Mała Armia Janosika's song "Walczymy do końca" premiered. The musical production of the song was handled by the award-winning producer Bartosz "Tabb" Zielony; Damian Pałasz is the author of the lyrics and composer of the song. The music video was recorded on the occasion of the 2022 FIFA World Cup, and the song had a motivational character aimed at encouraging support for the Polish national team during the tournament. The "Walczymy do końca" music video surpassed 1.1 million views on YouTube. The song made it onto the Vox FM radio charts and was played on radio stations such as Polskie Radio Program I and Polskie Radio Program III. It was also featured on television channels including TVP1, TVP2, TVP Info, TVP Polonia, Polo TV, TV Trwam, as well as in programs like Pytanie na śniadanie and Teleexpress.

On December 24, 2022, Mała Armia Janosika performed during the concert "Zajaśniała gwiozdecka nad Tatrami," which was broadcast by Polsat, Super Polsat, Polo TV, and Disco Polo Music channels.

=== 2023 ===
On January 6, 2023, the band performed during the annual Three Kings' Procession in Łódź, which was broadcast by TVP3. At the end of February, Mała Armia Janosika performed during the concert "Stay Together – Nie bądź obojętny," organized on the occasion of the first anniversary of the Russian invasion of Ukraine. The band appeared on stage at the beginning and end of the event, which was also attended by Kayah, Grzegorz Hyży, and Kasia Kowalska. On April 2, the group performed during the concert "Nie zastąpi Ciebie nikt," organized on the occasion of the 18th anniversary of the death of Pope John Paul II. The concert was broadcast by TVP1 and Polskie Radio Program I. Besides Mała Armia Janosika, Edyta Górniak, Łukasz Zagrobelny, and Halina Mlynkova also appeared on stage.

On April 29, 2023, the band performed a concert in tribute to John Paul II on the occasion of the 103rd anniversary of his birth; it was broadcast on Telewizja Republika. On May 18, 2023, the premiere of the concert "Heavenly Better" took place on TVP1, which was held in the Market Square in Zamość. On July 2, 2023, Mała Armia Janosika performed during the Closing Ceremony of the European Games Kraków–Małopolska 2023. The band played the song "Tak smakuje życie" from Enej's repertoire and the piece "Janosik" accompanied by the Symphony Orchestra.

On July 29, 2023, the band performed a concert to commemorate the 7th Anniversary of World Youth Day at Campus Misericordiae in Brzegi. From August 3 to 5, 2023, the band embarked on a concert tour to Włocławek, Toruń, and Wadowice. In Toruń, they played a concert for the "15th Family Thanksgiving," which was broadcast live on Telewizja Trwam. In Wadowice, Mała Armia Janosika took part in the concert titled "Among Many Paths," which was aired on TVP1. On September 9, 2023, the group participated in the concert titled "There Is No Greater Love," organized to commemorate the beatification of the Ulmów Family. The concert was broadcast on Polish Television and also featured performances by Justyna Steczkowska, Marek Piekarczyk, Pectus, and Gospel Rain.

In November 2023, the latest album of the group was released, titled Zaświeciła Gwiozdecka nad Górami. The album features Highland pastorals and traditional carols adorned with the poetry of the Rabian poet Danuta-Truta Pałasz. The producer of the album is Damian Pałasz. On November 11, 2023, in celebration of Independence Regained Day, the band performed a concert at the Temple of Divine Providence in Warsaw.

In December 2023, on the official Mała Armia Janosika YouTube channel, the group gathered over 100,000 subscribers, thereby receiving recognition in the form of a silver play button. On December 12, 2023, during the ceremonial awarding of the Soli Crystals awards at the Krakow Philharmonic, the Mała Armia Janosika Association received two prestigious distinctions from the Małopolska Voivodeship Marshal's Office. The first was the award for the best non-governmental organization in the Małopolska Voivodeship – the "Leader of Non-Governmental Organizations in Małopolska" (in recognition of contributions to the artistic development of the young generation and shaping in young people a civic, social, and patriotic attitude). The second award was presented by the Marshal of the Małopolska Voivodeship in the category of culture and regional identity (for the educational development of the young generation in the spirit of respect for the cultural heritage of the Podhale region and national values, as well as for the promotion of Małopolska during national and international events).

On December 17, 2023, in Ruda Śląska-Kochłowice, the band performed a grand Christmas concert to inaugurate the 2023/2024 caroling season. On December 24, 2023, the IX Góralska Pasterka (English: "Highlander Christmas Eve") with Mała Armia Janosika took place in Skawa. On December 24, 2023, the concert "Great Caroling with Polsat in Podhale", featuring Mała Armia Janosika, aired on Polsat television.

=== 2024 ===
On January 6, 2024, the band performed a grand Christmas concert at the Co-Cathedral Basilica in Stalowa Wola. The concert was broadcast on Telewizja Trwam. In January 2024, the band toured Poland, giving Christmas concerts as part of the winter concert tour in the following towns: Opoczno, Wieluń, Grybów, Jaworzno, Rajsko, Dąbrowa Tarnowska. On February 3, Mała Armia Janosika participated in the farewell to the winter season 2023/2024, which took place at the Beskid Complex in Spytkowice.

On April 27, 2024, the band performed a concert in Ryki as part of the inauguration of the Summer season. On May 3, 2024, a television special titled The Great Highlander May Festival in Rabka-Zdrój premiered on TV Trwam. It was directed, produced, and musically supervised by Damian Pałasz.

On May 7, 2024, the band set off for Italy, undertaking the longest concert tour in their history. As part of the Italian tour, the band performed on May 8 during the general audience at the Vatican, singing for Pope Francis. On May 10, the band participated in a Holy Mass at the tomb of Saint John Paul II. On May 11, Mała Armia Janosika gave a grand thanksgiving concert at the Divino Amore Sanctuary during the 2nd Roman Polonia Days. On May 12, the band played at Monte Cassino, paying tribute to the murdered Poles.

On June 8, 2024, the Mała Armia Janosika Association organized an event called "The 5th Largest Highland May Picnic in Poland", in Rabka-Zdrój, to commemorate the 104th birthday of Pope John Paul II. In June 2024, the band performed concerts in Brzeszcze and Libiąż, and for the third time performed outside of Poland, this time in Bystřice in the Czech Republic. On July 7, 2024, Mała Armia Janosika appeared on stage during a televised concert in Uniejów, as part of the Earth Festival 2024. The band presented the song "Tak smakuje życie" from Enej's repertoire, and performed a song called "Moja Planeta" in a duet with Majka Jeżowska. The concert was broadcast live on Polsat. Other artists included Maryla Rodowicz, Alicja Majewska, and Kamil Bednarek, among others. On July 13, 2024, Mała Armia Janosika performed during a concert in Limanowa, which gathered thousands of spectators in front of the stage.

On August 1, 2024, Mała Armia Janosika embarked on their first concert tour in the Podlasie region, performing in Wysokie Mazowieckie. Later that month, the group gave concerts in Klwów and Żurawina during festivals attended by thousands of spectators. On September 8, the band performed at Jesień Grybowska in Lesser Poland Voivodeship, an annual cultural event, attracting a crowd of ten thousand fans. A large audience also attended their charity concert held beneath the Papal Window in Kraków. On October 5, 2024, Mała Armia Janosika participated in a benefit concert for the flood victims in Paczków, broadcast by Telewizja Trwam, with proceeds donated to those in need. The same broadcaster aired a patriotic concert entitled "From the Polish Mountains to Freedom" on November 11, 2024, held at the Temple of Divine Providence in Warsaw and featuring Mała Armia Janosika among the performers.

In December 2024, Mała Armia Janosika took part in the celebration of Radio Maryja's anniversary, performing at Arena Toruń in front of the audience of over 9,000 people. During the Christmas season, the group presented a carol concert at the basilica in Trzebinia. The event was broadcast by TVP3 and directed by Łukasz Lech. On December 24, 2024, Mała Armia Janosika performed during the 10th Highlander Christmas Eve celebration in Rabka-Zdrój — an event that gained international attention. Coverage of the concert reached millions of people online, including audiences in the United States, Canada, the United Kingdom, and Australia. The group achieved global recognition, with their activities being noted by major media outlets in Poland and abroad. Among those who praised the performance was Polish Prime Minister Mateusz Morawiecki. On December 28, the group gave a concert in Męcina, which attracted a large crowd and received considerable public interest.

=== 2025–2026 ===
In January 2025, Mała Armia Janosika carried out their first concert tour across the West Pomeranian Voivodeship, with performances in cities including Szczecin, Chojna and Myślibórz. The tour proved to be a success, drawing a total audience of over twenty thousand people. Reports from the tour were recorded for national television stations, including TVP and Telewizja Republika, and for the Dzień Dobry TVN morning show.

In February, the group received a gold record certification from the Polish Society of the Phonographic Industry (ZPAV) — for the sales of their album Jan Paweł II – Przyjaciel Podhalańskiej Ziemi. The following month, the band's leader, Damian Pałasz, was honored with the special award from the Do Rzeczy weekly magazine. He accepted the prize which was given to him for “outstanding achievements in promoting musical culture and shaping future generations”. In April, a special episode of the game show Name That Tune aired, in which Damian Pałasz reached the final and won, raising funds for charitable causes. On May 24, 2025, Mała Armia Janosika participated in the event called "The 6th Largest Highland May Picnic in Poland", which attracted over ten thousand attendees.

In the summer of 2025, Mała Armia Janosika embarked on another concert season, performing in cities across Poland to celebrate the tenth anniversary of their activity in the music industry. A major concert took place in Sieradz on May 31. On June 13, the group performed in Toruń at the Song of Songs Festival, and on June 14 they appeared at the “Kadzielnia” Amphitheatre in Kielce, attracting a large crowd of spectators. The concert in Malbork on June 20 drew nearly 2,800 attendees. The performance in Łososina Górna on June 22 received a positive response from the audience. At the end of June, as part of the European Music Festival (Polish: Europejskie Święto Muzyki), the band gave a concert in Poznań, which was broadcast by TVP1. On July 6 2025, Mała Armia Janosika performed in Rabka-Zdrój, giving a charity concert in tribute to Pope John Paul II. On July 19, the group took the stage at the Millennium Amphitheatre in Opole. According to Onet.pl, the performance was enthusiastically received by the audience, with the band “drawing crowds that filled the entire venue.”

In July 2025, Mała Armia Janosika embarked on its concert tour across the West Pomeranian Voivodeship, performing in cities including Kołobrzeg and Myślibórz. In August, the band played in Zakopane during the celebrations marking the 500th anniversary of the Gąsienica family, as well as in Łomża and Brodnica, where they performed at the Camping Brodnica Festival.

On September 6, 2025, Mała Armia Janosika performed at the Tauron Arena in Kraków. The event attracted more than 10,000 fans from Poland and abroad and featured guest appearances by Alicja Majewska, Włodzimierz Korcz, and Grubson. The concert served as a culmination of the band's ten years of artistic activity and as a tribute to all its members. The anniversary drew wide media attention – TVN and Republika produced reports from the concert, while the event was previewed on Polsat's Halo, tu Polsat morning show. At the end of the anniversary performance, Przemysław Firek – cultural manager and President of the Polish Culture Promotion Institute — presented the band's leader with a gold record to mark the group's tenth anniversary on the music scene. On September 13, 2025, the band performed in Rostkowo, attracting thousands of attendees participating in the annual pilgrimage to the site once associated with Saint Stanislaus Kostka.

On October 12, 2025, Mała Armia Janosika performed during a concert held on the occasion of the 25th Papal Day, titled “Saint John Paul II – Prophet of Hope.” The concert also featured performances by Roksana Węgiel, Mietek Szcześniak, and Janusz Radek. The event was broadcast on TVP1. On December 13, the ensemble began its winter Christmas carol concert tour, opening with a performance at Arena Toruń attended by 6,500 fans. On December 24, 2025, “The 11th Highlander Midnight Mass with Mała Armia Janosika” took place in Rabka-Zdrój. On the same day, the ensemble also appeared on TVN, performing in the “Wspólne kolędowanie – najpiękniejsze polskie melodie” concert. On December 25, 2025, the group again performed in Rabka-Zdrój, during a Christmas carol concert. The concert, titled “Malućkiemu kolęduje Mała Armia Janosika,” was broadcast on TVP1. To close the year — on December 28, 2025 — the ensemble performed at PreZero Arena in Gliwice, drawing an audience of 10,500 people.

Following this event, in early January 2026, the band set out on its winter concert tour, performing successively at Centennial Hall in Wrocław, Torwar Hall in Warsaw, and Tauron Arena in Kraków, where the concert attracted nearly 10,000 fans. On January 10, 2026, Mała Armia Janosika performed a Christmas carol concert at Zen.com Expo in Jasionka, filling the entire venue. On January 16, Mała Armia Janosika performed in Lublin at Globus Hall. On January 17, the band played a Christmas carol concert in Ryki, at the Church of the Most Holy Savior Parish. Among those attending the event was Marta Nawrocka, First Lady of Poland and wife of President Karol Nawrocki. The concert was held under the Honorary Patronage of Nawrocka.

On January 24, 2026, Mała Armia Janosika performed in Poznań at the Poznań International Fair, where the concert filled the venue with fans caroling together with the ensemble. On January 25, the group performed at the Sports Hall in Częstochowa. On February 1, the band concluded its Christmas carol tour with a finale at Stegu Arena in Opole (to a full audience), and on 28 February it closed the winter season tour with a performance at the Beskid Complex in Spytkowice. On 4 March, Mała Armia Janosika received a Gold Record from ZPAV for the album Zaświeciła Gwiozdecka nad Górami.

== Accolades ==
- 2024: Silver Medal of Pope John Paul II for services to the Archdiocese of Kraków, awarded to the founder and leader of the band, Damian Pałasz (for promoting the memory of Saint John Paul II, and for advocating religious, patriotic, and family values through the band's artistic activities)
- 2025: ZPAV — gold record certification (for Jan Paweł II – Przyjaciel Podhalańskiej Ziemi)
- 2025: “Kochać i Chronić”, a special award given by Do Rzeczy (receiver: Damian Pałasz, the band's leader)
- 2025: Gold record awarded to Damian Pałasz and the band by the President of the Polish Culture Promotion Institute, to mark ten years of their artistic activity
- 2026: ZPAV — gold record certification (for Zaświeciła Gwiozdecka nad Górami)

== Discography ==
Studio albums

- 2021: Jan Paweł II – Przyjaciel Podhalańskiej Ziemi

Christmas albums

- 2018: Kolędy i Pastorałki na góralską nutę
- 2023: Zaświeciła Gwiozdecka nad Górami

Singles and music videos

- 2016: "Siła jest w jedności"
- 2017: "Modlę się o miłość"
- 2018: "Białe róże"
- 2020: "Dni, których nie znamy"
- 2020: "Barka"
- 2020: "Nie zastąpi Ciebie nikt"
- 2022: "Walczymy do końca"

== Certifications ==
Album	Region	Certification	Certified units/sales
Jan Paweł II – Przyjaciel Podhalańskiej Ziemi	Poland (ZPAV)	Gold	15,000
Zaświeciła Gwiozdecka nad Górami	Poland (ZPAV)	Gold	15,000

== Band lineup ==
- Damian Pałasz – violin, conductor, founder

Musical section:

- Rafał "Piętaszek" Nowak – keyboard instruments, accordion (joined the band in summer 2019 and continues to play)
- Mariusz Pacyga – bass guitar (2019–present)
- Grzegorz Jaromin – drums (2019–present)
- Wojtek Czyrnek – electric and acoustic guitar (2020–present)

Former members:

- Marcin Grywalski – electric guitar (2019)
- Szymon Matras – bass guitar (2019)
- Krzysztof Stanik – electric and acoustic guitar (Winter 2019 – Spring 2020)

Source: TVP Polonia
