= Damian Pałasz =

Polish producer & conductor

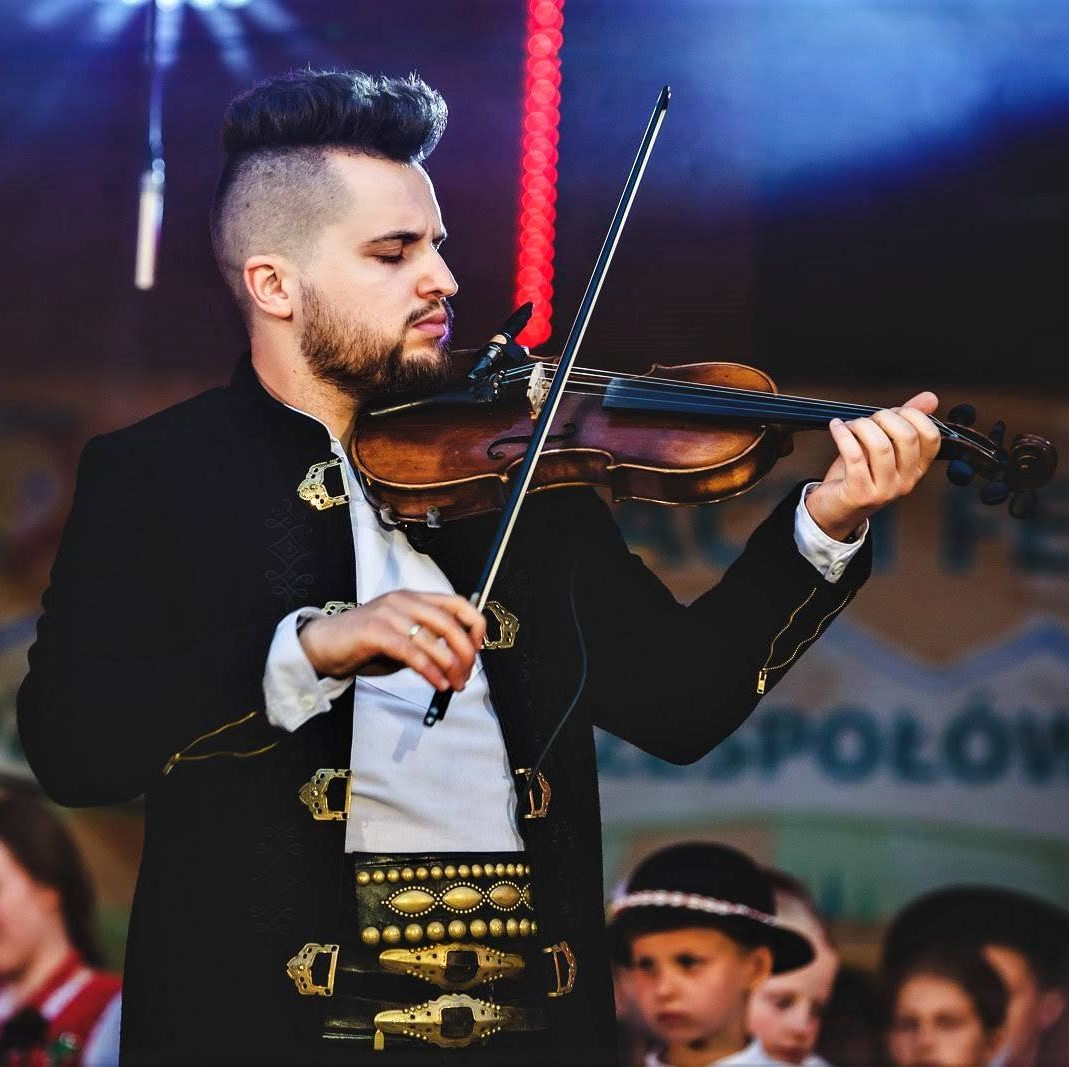
- Damian Pałasz in June 2019
- Occupations: Musician; music producer; conductor
- Years active: 2015–present
- Musical career
- Genres: Folk music; popular music
- Instruments: Violin; piano; mandolin; ukulele; basolia
- Member of: Mała Armia Janosika

Damian Pałasz is a Polish music producer, founder and conductor of a Folk music band Mała Armia Janosika. From 2016 to 2018, he was also the violinist for the band InoRos.

== Biography ==
=== Education ===
Between 1999 and 2005, he attended Queen Jadwiga's Primary School in Raba Wyżna, and between 2005 and 2008, he studied at Saint John Paul II's Junior High School No. 1, also in Raba Wyżna. From 1999 to 2007, he was a student at Fryderyk Chopin's State Music School of the First and Second Degree in Nowy Targ. He also attended Eugeniusz Romer's First High School and Holy Family's High School in Rabka-Zdrój. He then studied at the Krakow School of Jazz and Popular Music in the violin class, under the supervision of Dominik Bieńczycki. In 2019, he completed his education, obtaining a bachelor's and master's degree in the fields of: film and television production, and journalism and social communication with a specialization in media production.

=== Career ===
In 2018, Damian Pałasz performed at the Amfiteatr Tysiąclecia during the 55th National Festival of Polish Song in Opole, along with the band InoRos. During that event, the group performed the songs "Czyste szaleństwo" and "Dawaj, Polska", with which the members later participated in the "Hit na Mundial" competition. They took second place, just behind the band Kombi.

Damian Pałasz serves as the musical director, manager, and conductor of the Mała Armia Janosika band, which is considered the largest highlander band in Poland. The group consists of more than three hundred artists, mainly comprising youth and children from southern Poland. Damian Pałasz has produced music videos for Mała Armia Janosika, including "Siła jest w jedności", "Modlę się o miłość", "Białe róże", "Dni, których nie znamy", "Barka", "Nie zastąpi Ciebie nikt", and "Walczymy do końca", and has also released musical albums: Jan Paweł II – Przyjaciel Podhalańskiej Ziemi (2021) and Kolędy i Pastorałki na góralską nutę (2018). He composed the music and wrote the lyrics for the song "Walczymy do końca", which was recorded in order to support the Polish national team during football events.

In February 2018, he was awarded in the plebiscite held by Gazeta Krakowska as the "Personality of the Year 2017". He secured the first place in the county stage, and the second place in the provincial stage. In March 2019, in a competition organized by Dziennik Polski and Gazeta Krakowska, he was named the "Personality of the Year 2018" in the culture category, taking the first place in the Nowy Targ County and the second place in the Lesser Poland Voivodeship. He was nominated for his contribution to regional culture.

In the autumn of 2018, Damian Pałasz and members of the Mała Armia Janosika band were awarded during the fourteenth edition of the FilmAT Festival in Warsaw. The group, led by its conductor, was honored for the best documentary film in the history and heritage category, as well as for the "patriotic values" of the music video — both awards were given to "Białe róże", of which Pałasz was the director and producer.

Pałasz and Mała Armia Janosika were then invited to participate in the "Concert for the Independence" (Polish: "Koncert dla Niepodległej"), which took place on November 10, 2018, at the National Stadium in Warsaw. The concert was broadcast by all Polish television stations, and the band performed on stage alongside artists such as Maryla Rodowicz and Kamil Bednarek. The performance of Mała Armia Janosika was watched by 40,000 spectators at the stadium and by 7 million viewers gathered in front of their televisions.

On October 18, 2020, Pałasz performed with Mała Armia Janosika during the concert "Wadowice, Where Everything Began", organized by the Polish Television. The band performed the songs "Czarna Madonna" and "Barka" together with Anna Jurksztowicz and Mateusz Ziółko, and then sang the song "Do Wadowic wróć" with the duo Golec uOrkiestra. The concert was broadcast on TVP1.

In December 2022, Damian Pałasz and the members of Mała Armia Janosika participated in the concert "Zajaśniała gwiozdecka nad Tatrami", which was broadcast on Christmas Eve by Polsat. Pałasz served as the musical director for this event.

At the end of February 2023, Pałasz and Mała Armia Janosika performed at the "Stay Together – Nie bądź obojętny" concert, organized to mark the first anniversary of the Russian invasion of Ukraine. The band appeared on stage both at the beginning and the end of the event, which also featured Kayah, Grzegorz Hyży, and Kasia Kowalska. On April 2, the group performed at the concert titled "Nie zastąpi Ciebie nikt", organized to commemorate the 18th anniversary of the death of Pope John Paul II. The concert was broadcast by TVP1 and Polskie Radio Program I.

On July 2, 2023, Pałasz and Mała Armia Janosika performed during the Closing Ceremony of the European Games Kraków–Małopolska 2023. The band played the song "Tak smakuje życie" from Enej's repertoire and the piece "Janosik" accompanied by the Symphony Orchestra. In Summer of 2023, the band embarked on a concert tour which was broadcast by TVP1 and TV Trwam. On September 9, 2023, Pałasz and the group participated in the concert titled "There Is No Greater Love", organized to commemorate the beatification of the Ulma family. The concert was broadcast on Polish Television and also featured performances by Justyna Steczkowska, Marek Piekarczyk and Pectus.

In November 2023, Damian Pałasz produced a Christmas album titled Zaświeciła Gwiozdecka nad Górami, which was recorded by Mała Armia Janosika. The album features Highland pastorals and traditional carols embellished with the poetry of the Rabian poet Danuta-Truta Pałasz.

On December 12, 2023, during the ceremonial awarding of the Soli Crystals awards at the Krakow Philharmonic, Pałasz and the Mała Armia Janosika Association received two prestigious distinctions from the Małopolska Voivodeship Marshal's Office. The first was the award for the best non-governmental organization in the Małopolska Voivodeship – the "Leader of Non-Governmental Organizations in Małopolska" (in recognition of contributions to the artistic development of the young generation and shaping in young people a civic, social, and patriotic attitude). The second award was presented by the Marshal of the Małopolska Voivodeship in the category of culture and regional identity (for the educational development of the young generation in the spirit of respect for the cultural heritage of the Podhale region and national values, as well as for the promotion of Małopolska during national and international events).

On December 17, 2023, Pałasz and Mała Armia Janosika performed a grand Christmas concert in Ruda Śląska-Kochłowice to inaugurate the 2023/2024 caroling season. On December 24, 2023, the "IX Góralska Pasterka" (English: Highland Christmas Eve) took place in Skawa — the event was organized by Damian Pałasz. Also on December 24, 2023, the concert "Wielkie Kolędowanie z Polsatem na Podhalu" aired on Polsat, featuring Pałasz and Mała Armia Janosika. The performance was rebroadcast during Christmas on Polsat 2 and Super Polsat channels. On January 6, 2024, Damian Pałasz's band performed a grand Christmas concert at the Basilica Co-Cathedral in Stalowa Wola. The concert was broadcast on TV Trwam.

On April 27, 2024, Mała Armia Janosika, under the direction of Damian Pałasz, played a concert in Ryki to inaugurate the Summer season. On May 3, 2024, a television special titled The Great Highlander May Festival in Rabka-Zdrój premiered on TV Trwam. It was directed, produced, and musically supervised by Pałasz. On May 7, 2024, Mała Armia Janosika set off for Italy, embarking on the longest concert tour in their career. As part of the tour, the group performed on May 8 during a general audience in the Vatican, playing under Damian Pałasz's direction for Pope Francis. On May 10, the band participated in a Holy Mass at the tomb of Saint John Paul II. On May 11, Mała Armia Janosika, under Pałasz's direction, gave a grand thanksgiving concert at the Divino Amore Sanctuary during the Second Roman Polonia Days. On May 12, the band performed at Monte Cassino, paying tribute to the murdered Poles. Damian Pałasz served as the artistic and musical director of the performances during the tour in Italy.

On June 8, 2024, the Mała Armia Janosika Association, led by Damian Pałasz, organized an event called "The 5th Largest Highland May Picnic in Poland", in Rabka-Zdrój, to commemorate the 104th birthday of Pope John Paul II. In June 2024, the band performed concerts in Brzeszcze and Libiąż, and for the third time performed outside of Poland, this time in Bystřice in the Czech Republic. On July 7, 2024, Pałasz's band appeared on stage during a televised concert in Uniejów, as part of the Earth Festival 2024. The group presented the song "Tak smakuje życie" from Enej's repertoire, and performed a song called "Moja Planeta" in a duet with Majka Jeżowska. The concert was broadcast live on Polsat. Other artists included Maryla Rodowicz, Alicja Majewska, and Kamil Bednarek, among others. On July 13, 2024, Pałasz and Mała Armia Janosika performed during a concert in Limanowa, which gathered thousands of spectators in front of the stage.

On August 1, 2024, Damian Pałasz and Mała Armia Janosika embarked on their first concert tour in the Podlachia region, performing in Wysokie Mazowieckie. Later that month, the group gave concerts in Klwów and Żurawina, during festivals attended by thousands of viewers. On September 8, the band performed at Jesień Grybowska, an annual cultural event, attracting a crowd of ten thousand fans. A large audience also attended their charity concert held beneath the Papal Window in Kraków. On October 5, 2024, Mała Armia Janosika participated in a benefit concert for the victims of the Paczków flood. It was broadcast by Telewizja Trwam, with proceeds donated to those in need. The same television aired a patriotic concert, entitled "From the Polish Mountains to Freedom", in November 2024 — it was held at the Temple of Divine Providence in Warsaw and featured Mała Armia Janosika among the performers.

In December 2024, Mała Armia Janosika and Pałasz took part in the celebration of Radio Maryja's anniversary, performing at Arena Toruń in front of the audience of over 9,000 spectators. During the Christmas season, the group presented a carol concert at the basilica in Trzebinia. The event was broadcast by TVP3. On December 24, 2024, Mała Armia Janosika performed during the 10th Highlander Christmas Eve celebration in Rabka-Zdrój — an event that gained international attention. Coverage of the concert reached millions of people online, including audiences in the United States, the United Kingdom, Canada, and Australia. The group achieved global recognition, with their activities being noted by major media outlets in Poland and abroad. Among those who praised the performance was Polish Prime Minister Mateusz Morawiecki. On December 28, the group gave a concert in Męcina, which attracted a large crowd and received considerable public interest.

In January 2025, Mała Armia Janosika and Damian Pałasz carried out their first concert tour across the West Pomeranian Voivodeship, with performances in cities including Szczecin, Chojna and Myślibórz. The tour proved to be a success, drawing a total audience of over 20,000 people. Reports from the tour were recorded for national television stations, including TVP and Telewizja Republika, and for the Dzień Dobry TVN morning show.

In February 2025, Damian Pałasz and his group received a gold record certification from the Polish Society of the Phonographic Industry (ZPAV) — for the sales of the album Jan Paweł II – Przyjaciel Podhalańskiej Ziemi. The following month, Pałasz was honored with the special award from the Do Rzeczy weekly magazine. He accepted the prize, which was given to him for “outstanding achievements in promoting musical culture and shaping future generations”. In April, a special episode of the game show Name That Tune aired, in which Damian Pałasz reached the final and won, raising funds for charitable causes. On May 24, 2025, Mała Armia Janosika participated in the event called "The 6th Largest Highland May Picnic in Poland", which attracted over ten thousand attendees.

In the summer of 2025, Mała Armia Janosika embarked on another concert season, performing in cities across Poland to celebrate the tenth anniversary of their activity in the music industry. A major concert took place in Sieradz on May 31. On June 13, the group performed in Toruń at the Song of Songs Festival, and on June 14 they appeared at the “Kadzielnia” Amphitheatre in Kielce, attracting a large crowd of spectators. Nearly 2,800 people attended the concert in Malbork on June 20. The performance in Łososina Górna on June 22 received a positive response from the audience. Later that month, as part of the European Music Festival (Europejskie Święto Muzyki), the group gave a televised performance in Poznań broadcast by TVP1. On July 6 2025, Mała Armia Janosika performed in Rabka-Zdrój, giving a charity concert in tribute to Pope John Paul II. On July 19, the group took the stage at the Millennium Amphitheatre in Opole. According to Onet.pl, the performance was enthusiastically received by the audience, with the band “drawing crowds that filled the entire venue.”

In July 2025, Damian Pałasz and the band launched a concert tour throughout the West Pomeranian Voivodeship, with performances in several cities, including Kołobrzeg and Myślibórz. In August, the band played in Zakopane during the celebrations marking the 500th anniversary of the Gąsienica family, as well as in Łomża and Brodnica, where they performed at the Camping Brodnica Festival.

On September 6, 2025, Damian Pałasz and Mała Armia Janosika gave a major concert at the Tauron Arena in Kraków. The event attracted more than 10,000 fans from Poland and abroad and featured guest appearances by Alicja Majewska, Włodzimierz Korcz, and Grubson. Serving as a culmination of the group's decade-long artistic career, the concert also paid tribute to all its members. The anniversary attracted considerable media attention – TVN and Republika aired reports from the event, and the concert was previewed on Polsat's Halo, tu Polsat morning show. At the conclusion of the show, Przemysław Firek – cultural manager and President of the Polish Culture Promotion Institute — awarded Damian Pałasz with a gold record to mark the group's tenth anniversary on the music scene. On September 13, 2025, the band performed in Rostkowo, attracting thousands of attendees participating in the annual pilgrimage to the site once associated with Saint Stanislaus Kostka.

On October 12, 2025, Damian Pałasz and Mała Armia Janosika took part in a concert organized for the 25th Papal Day under the title “Saint John Paul II – Prophet of Hope.” The lineup also included Roksana Węgiel and Janusz Radek. The event was broadcast by TVP1. The group launched its winter Christmas carol tour on 13 December with a concert at Arena Toruń, which attracted an audience of 6,500. On December 24, 2025, the ensemble participated in the 11th Highlander Midnight Mass in Rabka-Zdrój. That same day, they also appeared on TVN, performing during the concert “Wspólne kolędowanie – najpiękniejsze polskie melodie.” The following day, the group once again performed in Rabka-Zdrój as part of a Christmas carol concert. The event, titled “Malućkiemu kolęduje Mała Armia Janosika,” was televised on TVP1. On December 28, 2025 Pałasz performed at PreZero Arena in Gliwice, where 10,500 people attended the concert.

After this performance, Pałasz and his group embarked on a winter tour in early January 2026. The schedule included consecutive concerts at Centennial Hall in Wrocław, Torwar Hall in Warsaw, and Tauron Arena in Kraków, where the show drew close to 10,000 attendees. On January 10, 2026, Mała Armia Janosika gave a Christmas carol performance at Zen.com Expo in Jasionka, filling the entire venue. Then, Pałasz and the group appeared in Lublin on January 16, performing at Globus Hall. On January 17, the musicians held a Christmas carol concert in Ryki at the Church of the Most Holy Savior Parish. Those present included Marta Nawrocka, the First Lady of Poland and spouse of President Karol Nawrocki. The event took place under her Honorary Patronage.

On January 24, 2026, Mała Armia Janosika appeared at the Poznań International Fair, where the venue was packed with fans singing carols alongside the ensemble. On February 1, the musicians brought their Christmas carol tour to an end with a final performance at Stegu Arena in Opole, playing to a capacity crowd. Later, on 28 February, they wrapped up the winter touring season with a concert at the Beskid Complex in Spytkowice. On 4 March, Mała Armia Janosika was awarded a Gold Record by ZPAV for the album Zaświeciła Gwiozdecka nad Górami.

Alongside the Mała Armia Janosika band, Damian Pałasz performed during the ceremonial events broadcast by the largest television stations in Poland. Among those are:

- Koncert dla Niepodległej (English: Concert for Independence; 2018, TVP1, TVP2, TVP Polonia, Polsat, TVN);
- Góralska Pasterka w Rabie Wyżnej (2019 TVP Info, TVP3);
- "Wadowice, tu wszystko się zaczęło" (2020, TVP1);
- Solidarni z Białorusią (2021, TVP Polonia);
- Kolędowanie z Małą Armią Janosika (2022, TV Trwam);
- "Zajaśniała gwiozdecka nad Tatrami" (2022, Polsat);
- Orszak Trzech Króli w Łodzi (2023, TVP3);
- "Stay Together – Nie bądź obojętny" (2023, Polsat);
- "Nie zastąpi Ciebie nikt" (2023, TVP1);
- "103. Rocznica Urodzin Ojca Świętego Jana Pawła II" (2023, TV Republika);
- "O niebo lepiej" (2023, TVP1, TVP Polonia);
- Ceremonia Zamknięcia Letnich Igrzysk Europejskich Kraków–Małopolska 2023 (English: The Closing Ceremony of the European Games Kraków-Małopolska; 2023, TVP1);
- 15. Dziękczynienie w Rodzinie (2023, TV Trwam);
- "Pośród wielu dróg" (2023, TVP1);
- "Nie ma większej miłości" (2023, TVP);
- "Wielkie kolędowanie z Polsatem na Podhalu" (2023, Polsat, Super Polsat, Polsat 2);
- "Koncert kolęd i pastorałek w Stalowej Woli" (2024, TV Trwam);
- "The Great Highlander May Festival in Rabka-Zdrój" (2024, TV Trwam);;
- Earth Festival – Uniejów 2024 (2024; Polsat);;
- "Serce dla Powodzian" (2024; TV Trwam);;
- "Z polskich gór ku wolności" (2024; TV Trwam);;
- "Piosenka na cztery strony świata" (2025; TVP1).;
- „Święty Jan Paweł II – Prorok Nadziei” (2025, TVP1);
- „Malućkiemu kolęduje Mała Armia Janosika” (2025, TVP1)

== Accolades ==
- 2024: Silver Medal of Pope John Paul II for services to the Archdiocese of Kraków, awarded to Damian Pałasz (for promoting the memory of Saint John Paul II, and for advocating religious, patriotic, and family values through his artistic activities)
- 2025: ZPAV — gold record certification (for Jan Paweł II – Przyjaciel Podhalańskiej Ziemi, with Mała Armia Janosika)
- 2025: “Kochać i Chronić”, a special award given by Do Rzeczy
- 2025: Gold record awarded to Damian Pałasz by the President of the Polish Culture Promotion Institute, to mark ten years of their artistic activity
- 2026: ZPAV — gold record certification (for Zaświeciła Gwiozdecka nad Górami, with Mała Armia Janosika)

== Discography ==
Studio albums

- 2021: Jan Paweł II – Przyjaciel Podhalańskiej Ziemi

Christmas albums

- 2018: Kolędy i Pastorałki na góralską nutę
- 2023: Zaświeciła Gwiozdecka nad Górami

Singles and music videos

- 2016: "Siła jest w jedności"
- 2017: "Modlę się o miłość"
- 2017: "Karpia łuski dwie"
- 2018: "Dawaj, Polska"
- 2018: "Białe róże"
- 2020: "Dni, których nie znamy"
- 2020: "Barka"
- 2020: "Nie zastąpi Ciebie nikt"
- 2022: "Walczymy do końca"
