= 2137 =

2137 may refer to:

- 2137 AD
- 2137 BC
- 21:37, the time at which Pope John Paul II died
  - Internet memes about Pope John Paul II
- 2137 (number)
- 2137 Priscilla, minor planet
- UGC 2137, spiral galaxy at the western edge of the constellation Perseus
- Lectionary 2137
- Aeromist-Kharkiv Flight 2137, Iran aviation accident
- HR 2137
- GPS week number rollover#2137 occurrence
