= Andrzej Lampert =

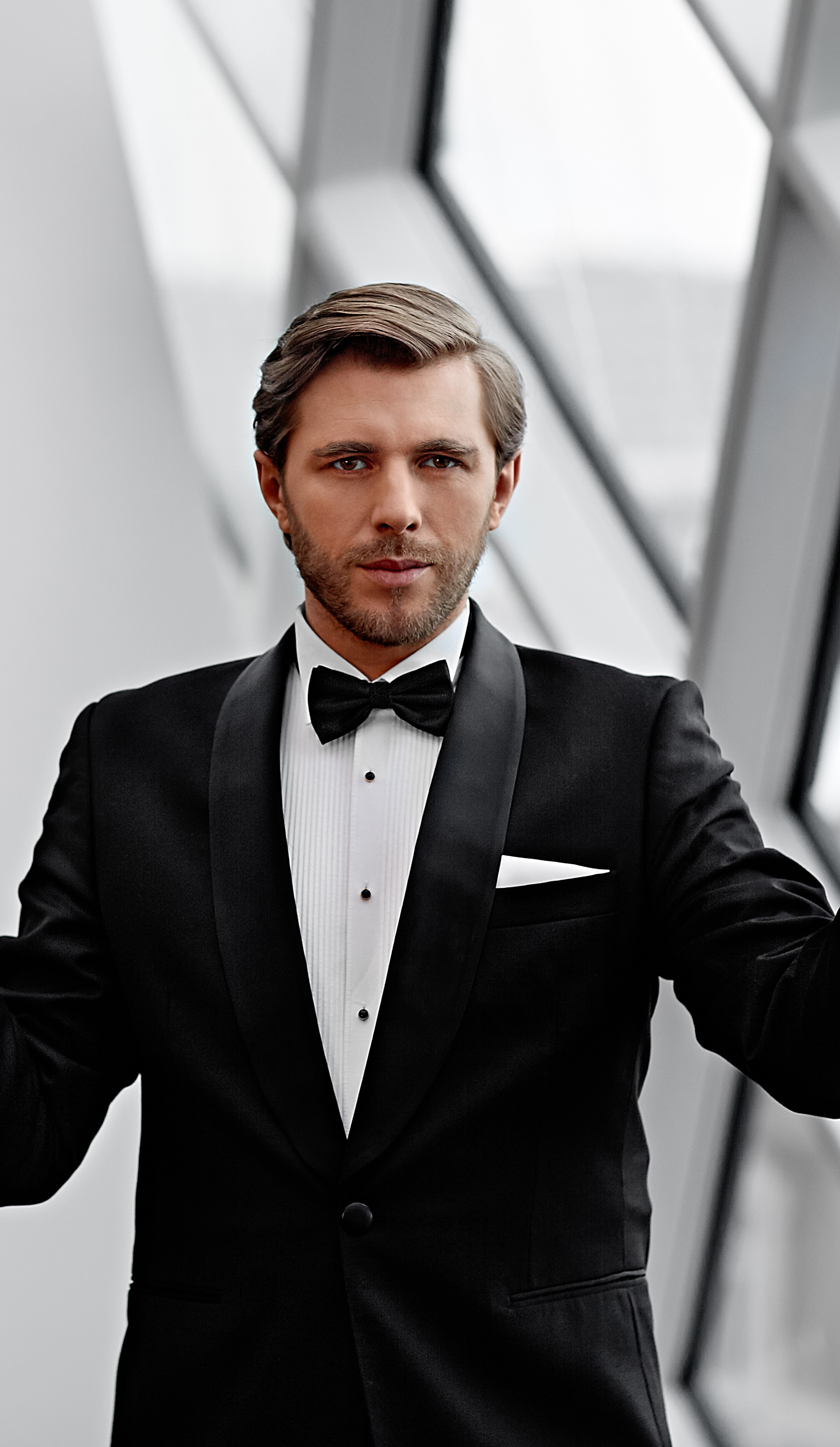
- Andrzej Lampert (2017)

Background information
- Born: October 2, 1981 (age 45); Chorzów, Poland
- Genres: Soft rock, classical music, opera
- Occupations: Singer-songwriter, opera singer (tenor)
- Years active: 1998–present

Andrzej Lampert (born October 2, 1981) is a Polish singer, opera singer (tenor), composer, lyricist, arranger and music co-producer for his band, PIN.

== Career ==
From an early age Lampert showed interest in music, taking singing and accordion lessons at a local art centre in his hometown of Chorzów. On December 14, 1997, he became the winner of Szansa na sukces (A Chance for Success), a reality television-music competition series on the public Polish Television (TVP). A year later he formed the short-lived boy band Boom Box, with which he recorded two LPs, "Boom Box" and "Czysta energia" (Pure Energy).

Lampert made further appearances on Szansa na sukces, winning again on July 12, 1998 (this episode regularly scheduled airing was on September 6, 1998), then on a special show whose theme were European hits on May 8, 2004, then again, in a Valentine special singing opera on February 12, 2006, singing La donna è mobile from Giuseppe Verdi's opera Rigoletto. He also appeared on the show as part of a retrospective on November 5, 2006, singing a song (Dni, których nie znamy – Days We Yet Don't Know) by a Polish singer-songwriter Marek Grechuta who had just died, on October 9, 2006. Lampert returned to the show on September 23, 2007, for its 15th anniversary celebration and on November 1, 2007, for an opera-themed episode, during which he sang Giovanni Capurro and Eduardo di Capua's "'O sole mio". On October 25, 2009, during the show's tribute to Michael Jackson, Lampert covered Jackson's "Billie Jean", and "I Just Can't Stop Loving You" in a duet.

Lampert graduated from a general upper secondary school (II Liceum Ogólnokształcące im. Juliusza Ligonia) and a state school of music, Państwowa Szkoła Muzyczna im. Grzegorza Fitelberga w Chorzowie in the class of vocal performance. From 2003 to 2005 he studied at the Department of Light Music and Jazz of University of Music in Katowice under Professor Renata Danel, PhD He also trained as a tenor at the Academy of Music in Kraków, from which he graduated in 2008, having studied classical solo vocal performance under Professor Janusz Borowicz.

In 2003, he formed the band, PIN with his friends Sebastian Kowol and Aleksander Woźniak. Their debut album was released in August 2005, featuring hit songs Bo to co dla mnie, Odlot aniołów, 2 kwietnia 2005, and Wina mocny smak.

== Awards ==
- 2005: special award on the initiative of Wiesław Ochman for the most promising tenor voice at the III Konkurs Wokalny im. Ignacy Jan Paderewski in Bydgoszcz

== Discography ==
=== Albums ===
==== with PIN ====
- 2011: Film o sobie [EMI Music Poland / Pomaton]
- 2008: Muzykoplastyka [EMI Music Poland / Pomaton]
- 2005: 0001 [EMI Music Poland / Pomaton]

==== with Boom Box ====
- 1999: Czysta energia [Universal Music Polska]
- 1998: Boom Box [PolyGram Polska]
