= Crossover music =

Musical works that appeal to different types of audiences

Crossover is a term applied to musical works or performers who appeal to different types of audiences. This can be seen, for example, when a song appears on two or more of the record charts, which track differing musical styles or genres.

In some contexts, the term "crossover" can have negative connotations associated with cultural appropriation, implying the dilution of a music's distinctive qualities to appeal to mass tastes. For example, in the early years of rock and roll, many songs originally recorded by African-American musicians were re-recorded by white artists such as Pat Boone in a more toned-down style, often with changed lyrics, that lacked the hard edge of the original versions. These covers were popular with a much broader audience.

== Classical crossover ==
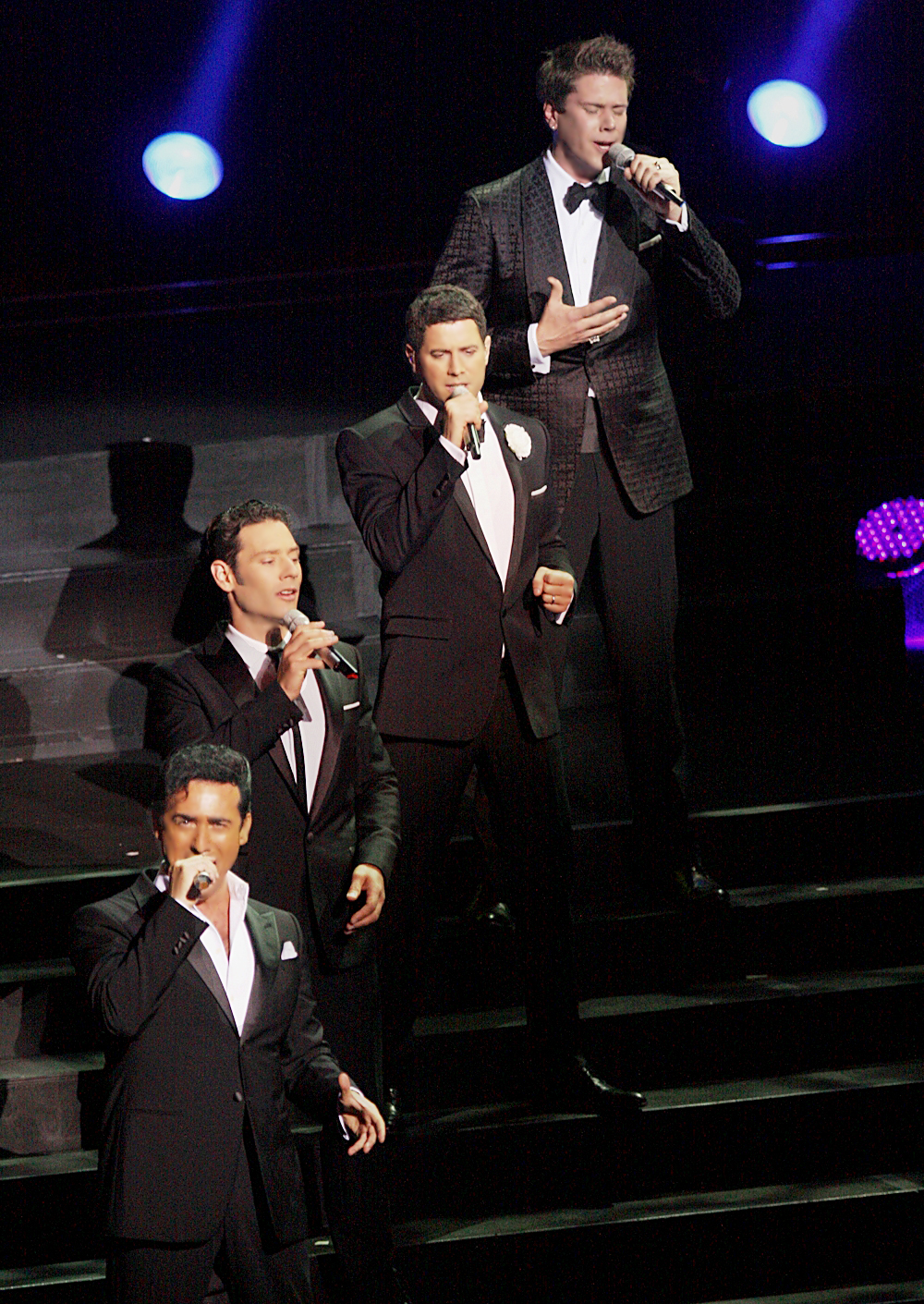
Four-piece musical group Il Divo, a noted classical crossover act, performs in February 2012 at the Sydney Opera House.

Classical crossover broadly encompasses both classical music that has become popularized and a wide variety of popular music forms performed in a classical manner or by classical artists. It can also refer to collaborations between classical and popular performers, as well as music that blends elements of classical music (including operatic and symphonic) with popular music (including pop, rock, middle of the road, and Latin, among other types). Pop vocalists and musicians, opera singers, classical instrumentalists, and occasionally rock groups primarily perform classical crossover. Although the phenomenon has long been widespread in the music industry, record companies first used the term "classical crossover" in the 1980s. It has gained in popularity since the 1990s and has acquired its own Billboard chart.

=== Popular classics ===
Canon and Gigue in D
Performed and realized on synthesizers by Jeffrey Hall.

A means of generating vast popularity for the classics has been through their use as inspirational anthems in sports settings. The aria "Nessun Dorma" from Puccini's Turandot, especially Luciano Pavarotti's version, has become indissolubly linked with soccer.

=== Classical performers ===
Within the classical recording industry, the term "crossover" is applied particularly to classical artists' recordings of popular repertoire such as Broadway show tunes. Two examples of this are Lesley Garrett's excursions into musical comedy and José Carreras's recording West Side Story, as well as Teresa Stratas' recording Showboat. Soprano Eileen Farrell is generally considered to be one of the first classical singers to have a successful crossover recording with her 1960 album I've Got a Right to Sing the Blues.

The first Three Tenors concert in 1990 was a landmark in which Luciano Pavarotti, José Carreras and Plácido Domingo brought a combination of opera, Neapolitan folksong, musical theatre and pop to a vast television audience. This laid the foundations for the modern flourishing of classical crossover.

Collaborations between classical and popular performers have included Sting and Edin Karamazov's album Songs from the Labyrinth. A collaboration between Freddie Mercury and soprano Montserrat Caballé resulted in the worldwide hit "Barcelona". R&B singer Mariah Carey performed a live duet with her mother Patricia, who is an opera singer, of the Christmas song "O Come, All Ye Faithful". Welsh mezzo-soprano Katherine Jenkins performed a duet with rock singer Michael Bolton of "O Holy Night". Singers and instrumentalists from the classical tradition, Andreas Dorschel has argued, run the risk of losing the sophistication of the genre(s) they were trained in, when they try to perform rock music, without coming up to the often rough and wild qualities of the latter.

Italian pop tenor Andrea Bocelli, who is the biggest-selling singer in the history of classical music, has been described as the king of classical crossover. British soprano Sarah Brightman is also considered a crossover classical artist, having released albums of classical, folk, pop and musical-theatre music. Brightman dislikes the classical crossover label, though she has said she understands the need to categorize music. In the 2008 Polish release of her Symphony album she sings "I Will Be with You (Where the Lost Ones Go)" with Polish tenor Andrzej Lampert, another artist who has performed in both classical and non-classical styles, as well as having actually obtained full musical training and academic degrees in both (though operatic singing is his main professional focus).

Classical crossover can generate debate over the boundaries between popular and classical musics. André Rieu's combination of orchestral performance, popular repertoire, and spectacle has attracted criticism from classical music critics who have argued that Rieu's music is kitschy, schmaltzy, and commercialised. An analysis of his reception argues that these responses reflect tensions over cultural hierarchy and the status of classical music.

== See also ==
- Crossover thrash
- Eclecticism in art
- Folk music
- Jazz fusion
- Polystylism
- Standard (music)
- World music

== Bibliography ==
- Gilliland, John (1969). "The Tribal Drum: The rise of rhythm and blues" (audio). Pop Chronicles. University of North Texas Libraries.
- Lonergan, David F. Hit Records, 1950–1975. Scarecrow Press, 2004. ISBN 0-8108-5129-6
