= Pałasz =

Pałasz is the Polish word for backsword and scabbardfish.

As a surname it can refer to:

- Aleksandra Pałasz, Polish chemist
- Andrzej Pałasz (born 1960), a Polish international football player.
- Damian Pałasz (born 1992), a Polish violinist, music producer, and conductor.
- Elżbieta Pałasz (born 1964), Polish writer.
- Ewa Pałasz-Rutkowska (born 1953), Polish professor of oriental studies
- Jerzy Pałasz (1930–1993), Polish diplomat, accountant.
- Kazimierz Pałasz (born 1952), Polish politician and local government official.
- Lech Pałasz, Polish economist
- Magdalena Pałasz (born 1995), Polish ski jumper and commentator.
- Marcin Pałasz (born 1971), Polish writer and radio play author.
- Michał Pałasz (1910–1992), Polish social and political activist.
- Mirosław Pałasz (1935–2000), Polish diplomat and orientalist.
- Patryk Pałasz (born 1984), Polish fencer.
