= 4649 =

4649 may refer to:

- NGC 4649, another name for Messier 60, an elliptical galaxy
- ADS 4649, a star in double system
- 4649 Sumoto, a minor planet
- 4649 ("yoroshiku"), a Japanese wordplay
- 4649, a year in the 5th millennium
