= G2A =

Digital marketplace for video game keys

G2A.COM
- Website type: Digital distribution
- Available in: English, French, German, Polish, Portuguese, Spanish
- Founded: 2010; 16 years ago
- Area served: Worldwide
- Founders: Bartosz Skwarczek; Dawid Rożek
- Employees: 400 (2025)
- Website: www.g2a.com
- Commercial: Yes
- Registration: Yes
- Users: 30 million (2024)

G2A.COM headquarters in Amsterdam

G2A.COM Limited, commonly known simply as G2A, is a digital marketplace platform headquartered in the Netherlands with offices in Poland, Hong Kong and the United States. The platform operates on the basis of resale of video games and other digital items via activation codes.

== History ==
The company was founded (originally as Go2Arena) in 2010 by Bartosz Skwarczek and Dawid Rożek in Rzeszów, Poland as an online video game store. The target audience was primarily young gamers limited by their disposable income. Skwarczek noticed a trend in digital versions of games becoming gradually more and more popular than traditional physical copies. In order to respond to this growing trend the company changed its business model in 2013 from a retailer to a global digital marketplace. G2A Marketplace has been launched in 2014.

In December 2016 G2A became the title sponsor of the Exhibition & Congress Center in the Subcarpathian Voivodeship of Poland, located next to Rzeszów International Airport. The center was renamed the G2A Arena.

In 2017, G2A partnered with Microsoft to use Azure cloud technology on G2A Marketplace.

In 2018, the company integrated Nexmo's two-factor authentication API with the marketplace. In July 2018 physical items – electronics and gaming merchandise – were introduced on the platform. Ultimately, this was abandoned following a decision to make the marketplace entirely digital-oriented.

== Products and services ==
The main offering on G2A.COM is video game keys for platforms such as Steam, EA app, Ubisoft Connect, PlayStation Network, Xbox, and Nintendo Switch, as well as gift cards, top-ups, and other digital items.

According to data from September 2024, the platform has served over 30 million customers from 180 countries and has over 40 thousand sellers operating on it. The marketplace's catalog features over 75 thousand digital items.

In 2015 the company presented its first VR product: G2A Land. The project has been met with positive reception by industry specialists and media. By the end of 2016 G2A Land featured a cinema, a shooting range, and an underwater adventure in addition to a rollercoaster.

=== G2A PAY ===
G2A PAY was G2A.COM's online payment gateway. Introduced in January 2015, the service supported over 200 local and global payment methods (as of November 2018). Thanks to a partnership with BitPay, an American automated processing system for bitcoin-based payments, use of bitcoins was made available on the marketplace as well. This option was used by customers based in India.

G2A PAY was ultimately discontinued in 2022 when it became a part of ZEN.com, an electronic money institution.

=== G2A Direct ===
July 2016 saw G2A launch G2A Direct, a program aimed at video game developers and publishers. It lets partners earn on each third-party sale of their keys on G2A Marketplace. As of December 2023, more than 300 partners have joined the program.

== G2A Dev Studio ==
In 2015, G2A released its own VR app, a virtual theme park titled G2A Land. G2A Land has been released in 2017 for Oculus Rift. In 2018, the app has been renamed to Funland.

In 2016 GTA.com together with MSI, created Gotham VR, a virtual reality promotion for Batman v Superman: Dawn of Justice. In December of that year, G2A announced Blunt Force, a World War II-themed VR shooter game developed in collaboration with Mark Bristol.

In February 2018, G2A Dev Studio, which was responsible for VR projects, became an independent video game studio called Monad Rock.

== E-sports ==
Between 2014 and 2019 G2A.COM started partnerships with esports teams, such as Cloud9, Natus Vincere, Virtus Pro, and Polish esports organization x-Kom AGO. As of December 2023, the company has sponsored over 70 teams and 100 e-sports events.

In August 2016, G2A announced a partnership with Sporting Clube de Portugal.

In May 2017, G2A organized a bootcamp for two esports teams: Virtus.pro and Natus Vincere. In addition to training sessions, there was also a show match between the teams.

The EU-based Team Atlantis joined G2A.COM's partner roster in November 2019. Polish teams Gaming and Arcane Wave, joined in March 2020.

== Controversies ==
G2A has been subject to numerous controversies. Critics have labeled the website as a "grey marketplace", where users can resell keys bought at a lower price from one region to another at a much higher price. Many developers have called for their own games to be pirated because they make little to no money from G2A sales. In June 2016, tinyBuild's CEO, Alex Nichiporchik, accused G2A of allowing key resellers to resell fraudulently obtained game keys, costing the company US$450,000. Nichiporchik added that it felt pressured to participate in G2A's payment platform, which would take some of the sales revenue back to G2A, in exchange for rooting out fraud on its platform.

In 2017, the G2A Direct service was launched to allow developers to obtain revenue from G2A key sales. At that year's Game Developers Conference, outbound sales specialist Marius Mirek attempted to address G2A's reputation only to be subjected to ridicule. G2A Direct was criticized for only allowing 10% from key sales to go to game developers.

Addressing G2A in 2018, Charlie Oscar owner Sergei Klimov countered that G2A was not at fault, but indie developers "mismanaging their keys". He would also claim that the nature of economics between Eastern European companies and those in Western Europe and North America is also an issue. Klimov said that just as retail boxes could be unsold, bundle keys could also remain unsold or unused, and that a site like G2A is inevitable to offload and resell them.

In 2019, G2A proposed the development of a "Key Blocker" tool, through which developers can block the sale of keys that have been issued through promotions and giveaways. G2A stated they would need at least one hundred developers to show support for creating the tool, but only 19 developers would register. Unknown Worlds Entertainment founder Charlie Cleveland condemned G2A for "put(ting) the impetus on developers to have to take action..., while G2A profits off gray-market sales and credit card fraud."

=== Riot Games sponsorship ban ===
Riot Games, the developer and publisher of League of Legends, banned G2A from sponsoring teams during the 2015 League of Legends World Championship, in response to a breach in Riot's terms of service where G2A was selling fully leveled accounts.

In 2016, INTZ's Gabriel 'Tockers' Claumann was fined over US$1,000 at Campeonato Brasileiro de League of Legends (CBLoL), for wearing a T-shirt with G2A's logo on the shoulder. Midway through the game, he was asked to apply masking tape over the logo and told he would be fined.

=== Gearbox partnership ===
On 3 April 2017, Gearbox Publishing announced a partnership with G2A to sell collector's editions of Bulletstorm: Full Clip Edition. YouTube game critic John 'TotalBiscuit' Bain was critical of the promotion, citing G2A's negative press coverage and accusations against the company, and threatened to withhold covering Bulletstorm, or any other Gearbox game unless Gearbox canceled the deal. On 6 April 2017, one day before Bulletstorm: Full Clip Edition's release, Gearbox published a list of ultimatums made together with Bain for G2A to accept, which focused on G2A Shield, an open API for game developers, and G2A's payment system. When G2A didn't respond, Gearbox ended its partnership.

=== Product key fraud ===
Around June 2019, Unknown Worlds Entertainment accused the site of using promoted advertising in Google and other search engine results to promote sales of their games through G2A rather than other channels. They stated that they see no revenue from sales on G2A, and instead encouraged users to illegally download their games rather than purchase them on G2A. G2A also asked developers to audit their keys, and guaranteed to pay the developers ten times the value of any chargebacks resulting from problematic keys sold on G2A. Two developers raised the issue: Unknown Worlds asserting $30,000 of chargebacks related to bad keys for Natural Selection 2, and Wube Software for $6,600 of chargebacks for Factorio keys. Unknown Worlds later admitted an error in sourcing the chargebacks to G2A. In the case of Wube, G2A settled with the developers in May 2020 after confirming 198 keys were improperly purchased, settling for $39,600, tenfold the keys' cost.

== Philanthropy ==
On 1 December 2015, G2A.COM, together with multiple Twitch streamers, YouTubers, websites and gamers participated in a program dubbed #GamingTuesday in order to raise funds for the charity Save the Children. Over the year G2A.COM raised nearly $500,000 for this organization.

In January 2016 Dawid Rożek confirmed that G2A.COM and G2A PAY were working together with Gaming For Good, a charity organization led by Bachir “Athene” Boumaaz, on two charity projects: HEART (Humanitarian Emergency All-Out Response Team) and a new edition of Gaming For Good. Both projects were to support the victims of natural disasters in various regions across the world.

G2A.COM also supports the Great Orchestra of Christmas Charity, not only by auctioning items, but also taking part in auctions. In January 2016 the company won an over 8 ft (2.5 m) tall statue of Geralt, the main character of The Witcher video game, during a charity auction by the Great Orchestra of Christmas Charity.

G2A.COM also organizes numerous other local charities, such as an awareness campaign in cooperation with local police to encourage pedestrians to wear reflective bands to increase their visibility after dark, funding a special VR facility for the Technical University of Rzeszow or sponsoring computers for local orphanages.

Additionally, in July 2017 G2A.COM held a “Become a Hero” charity contest where the winner could choose a foundation, orphanage or other institution supporting children in need to receive 20 tablets.

== Awards ==
Year	Contest	Awards
2024	eCommerce Awards	The main award in the category of Best Digital Marketing Campaign for the Diversity campaign
2024	eCommerce Awards	A third-place award in the Payments Innovation of the Year category, recognizing innovative digital payment solutions.
2024	VII edition of the 21st Century National Technology Awards	Best Marketplace
2024	14th Annual 2024 Globee® International Business Awards	Company of the Year: Retail; Gold Winner
2021	CNP Awards 2021	„Merchant of the Year” award for effective fraud prevention
2020	KTR 2020	Silver in the Craft category for advertising „You lose when you overpay”
2019	Golden Drum Festival	The commercial "You lose when you overpay" received a gold statuette for Best Direction and two silver statuettes in the categories Best Cinematography and Film
2018	III edition Benefits Festival	Best Benefits Award
2017	eBay Hong Kong	Best Deal of the Year
2017	Newsweek's Innovation Initiator	Special distinction from the editors of Business Insider Poland
2016	Award for Innovation in Customer Service	Customer Service Management Team of the Year
2016	Award for Innovation in Customer Service	Marketing Solution
2016	Global Business Excellence Awards	Outstanding Fast-Growth Business
2016	Global Business Excellence Awards	Outstanding Customer Service Team
2016	Global Business Excellence Awards	Outstanding New Product / Service
2016	UK Financial Services Award SERVICES AWARD	Innovation in Customer Experience
