= Cesáreo Gabaráin =

Spanish priest and hymnwriter (1936–1991)

Cesáreo Gabaráin (16 May 1936 – 30 April 1991) was a Spanish Catholic priest and composer of liturgical songs such as Pescador de hombres (Fisher of Men). He received a Gold Record award in Spain, and his music is well known and sung by English- and Spanish-speaking people. Gabaráin became a hymn-writer when he was thirty and went on to write about five hundred songs. He tried to write songs that were easy to learn and be sung by the entire congregation. His hymns have been cited as supportive in moments of personal and communal prayer and praise to God.

== Life ==
Cesáreo Gabaráin was born in Hernani (Gipuzkoa, Basque Country) in 1936, shortly before the Spanish Civil War and World War II. In addition to music, from 1946 to 1952 he studied at the minor seminary in Zaragoza, then at the major seminary in San Sebastián. He was ordained a priest in 1959. In the 1960s and 1970s, he was a chaplain at various colleges and nursing homes. During these years, he was a member of the Marist Brothers.

Named a chaplain prelate of the newly elected Pope John Paul II in 1979, Gabaráin conducted workshops in 22 US cities and recorded 37 albums before his death. He ministered to cyclists participating in the Tour de France and other athletes. Five of his hymns are in the United Methodist Hymnal, the most popular of which is "Fisher of Men" (1974). This hymn, which features a well-loved gentle melody, was used in two movies. When tour guides in Palestine claimed that the hymn was written alongside Lake Tiberias (Sea of Galilee) based on the lyrics, Gabaráin smiled because he had written it in Madrid. "Fisher of Men" has been translated into more than 80 languages.

In the 1980s, Gabaráin was an assistant priest at a parish in Madrid and head of a religious department at a college.

In 1991 he died of cancer in Anzuola, shortly before his 55th birthday.

== 500 songs for evangelism ==
The Second Vatican Council (1962–1965) permitted different styles of liturgical music, which gave Gabaráin a new freedom in hymn-writing. His songs were often inspired by people he met, and written with the intention to save more souls. He wrote about 500 songs as a teaching tool for church schools and to help missionaries. Gabaráin's personal favorites were "Fisher of Men" and "Together Like Brothers", owing to their popularity.

He met Pope John Paul II, who also considered "Fisher of Men" to be a favorite. The song was translated into English by Gertrude C. Suppe, George Lockwood and Raquel Gutiérrez-Achon as "Lord, You Have Come to the Lakeshore". The Polish version of the song ("Barka"), translated by Stanisław Szmidt, was especially popular.

== Abuse accusations ==
In August 2021, the Spanish daily newspaper El País reported on accusations of sexual abuse from 1978 when Gabaráin was a chaplain at the Marist school in Chamberí, Madrid. The Archdiocese of Madrid and the Marists performed a multi-year investigation, but could not validate the allegations.

In response to these public revelations in 2021, Oregon Catholic Press (OCP), the primary distributor of Gabaráin's music in the US, removed Gabaráin's music from its website and printed works, and donated royalties from his music to an organization that supports victims of abuse. After the Archdiocese of Madrid and the Marists could not prove the reports were credible, OCP restored Gabaráin's works in November 2024.
