= Sabała =

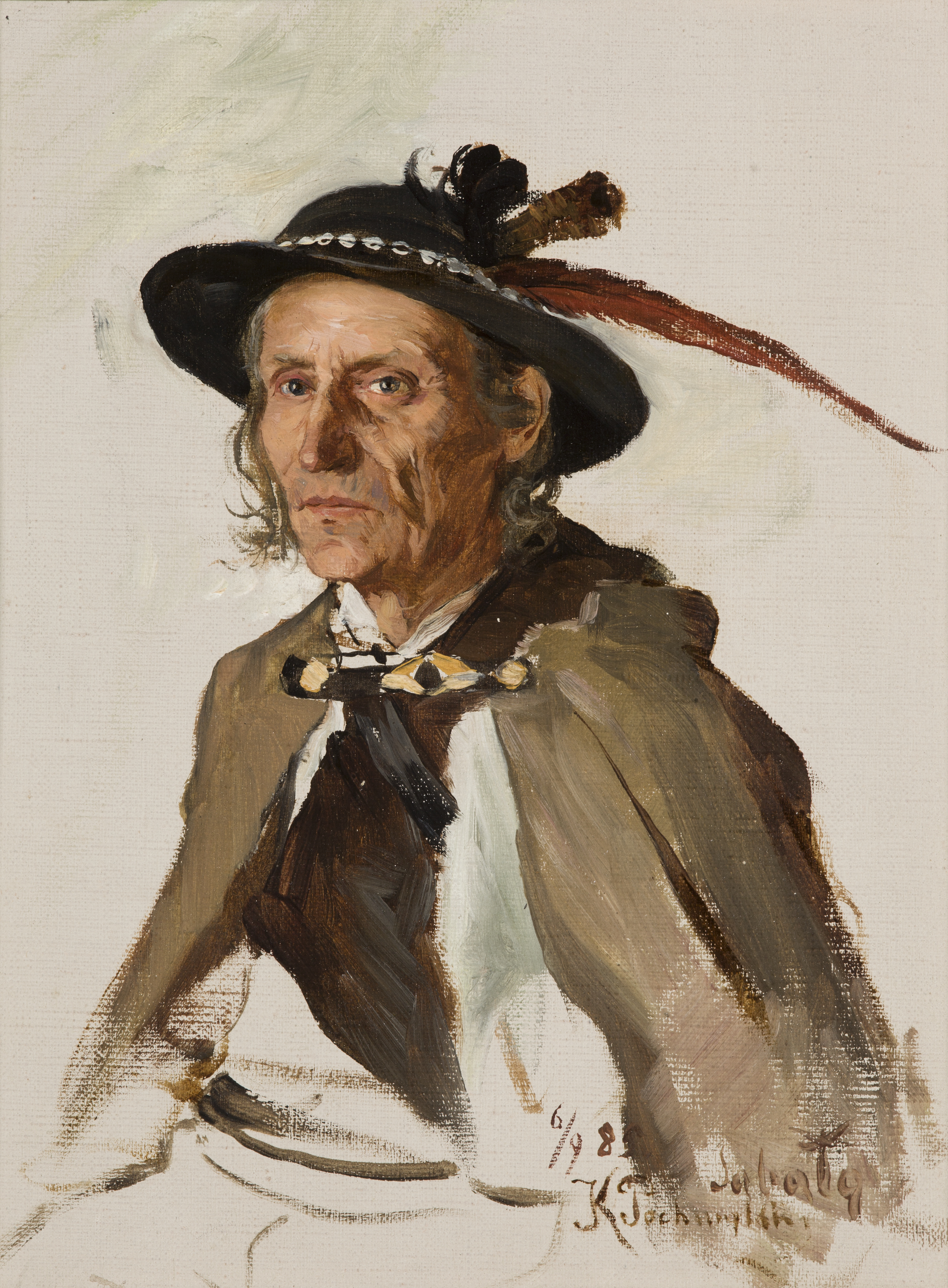
- Portrait by Kazimierz Pochwalski, 1885
- Born: Jan Krzeptowski né Gąsienica; 26 January 1809; Kościelisko
- Died: 8 December 1894 (aged 85); Zakopane
- Resting place: Pęksowy Brzyzek National Cemetery, Zakopane

Sabała or Sablik (born Jan Krzeptowski né Gąsienica; 1809-1894) was a Goral amateur musician, storyteller and folk singer active in or around the Tatra Mountains. A friend to many renowned Polish artists of the late 19th century, he is featured in numerous Polish works of art of the epoch.

The nicknames such as Sabała or Sablik were traditionally used by Goral families to distinguish between various branches of extended families and are still in use today. Sabała, together with his brothers, adopted the surname of Krzeptowski to distinguish themselves from the rest of the large Gąsienica family.

== Life ==
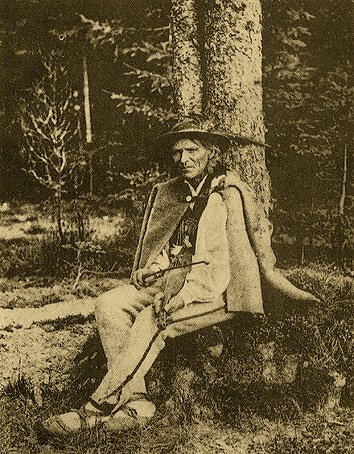
Jan Krzeptowski on a photograph by Stanisław Bizański

In his youth he was a poacher and, reportedly, also a mountain highwayman. He took part in the failed Chochołów Uprising of 1846, following which he spent some time in an Austrian prison. Set free, he abandoned his earlier life and, instead of settling down as a farmer, took up storytelling and playing music. For this reason local Gorals, and particularly so the wealthier gazdas, considered him a freak or a beggar. However, for scores of artists visiting the Tatra Mountains he became one of the symbols of the region and its culture. He accompanied Tytus Chałubiński and Stanisław Witkiewicz in their mountain expeditions. The latter dubbed him the "Homer of the Tatras". In the end Sabała became a godfather to Witkiewicz's son, Stanisław Ignacy.

He was a frequent guest at Witkiewicz's house in Zakopane, where he entertained his host's guests with stories and songs, at one time he even staged a fake highwaymen attack on Helena Modjeska, in which he himself played the role of the harnaś.

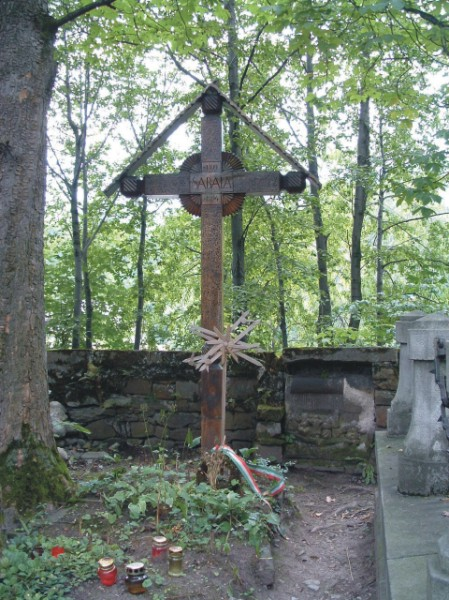
Sabała's tombstone at Pęksowy Brzyzek cemetery

In his later years he settled in "Zacisze" villa in Zakopane, where Wanda Lilpop took care of him. He died 8 December 1894. He is buried at the Pęksowy Brzyzek National Cemetery in Zakopane.

His brother's great-granddaughter was Joanna Wnuk-Nazarowa, a conductor and one-time minister of culture of Poland.

== Music ==
The melodies composed by Sabała for an instrument called złóbcoki (a variety of gęśle) are collectively known under the name of Sabałowe nuty (Sabała's notes) and are still being played by highlander folk ensembles. Sabała himself rarely did play in a band or for dance, for him his music was a form of personal expression. His compositions were an inspiration to many later composers and musicologists, including Ignacy Jan Paderewski, Karol Szymanowski, Stanislaw Mierczyński, Adolf Chybiński and Jan Kleczyński.

Sabała's złóbcoki, as well as numerous instruments modelled after his own, are preserved in the Museum of Musical Instruments, a division of the National Museum in Poznań.

== Literature ==
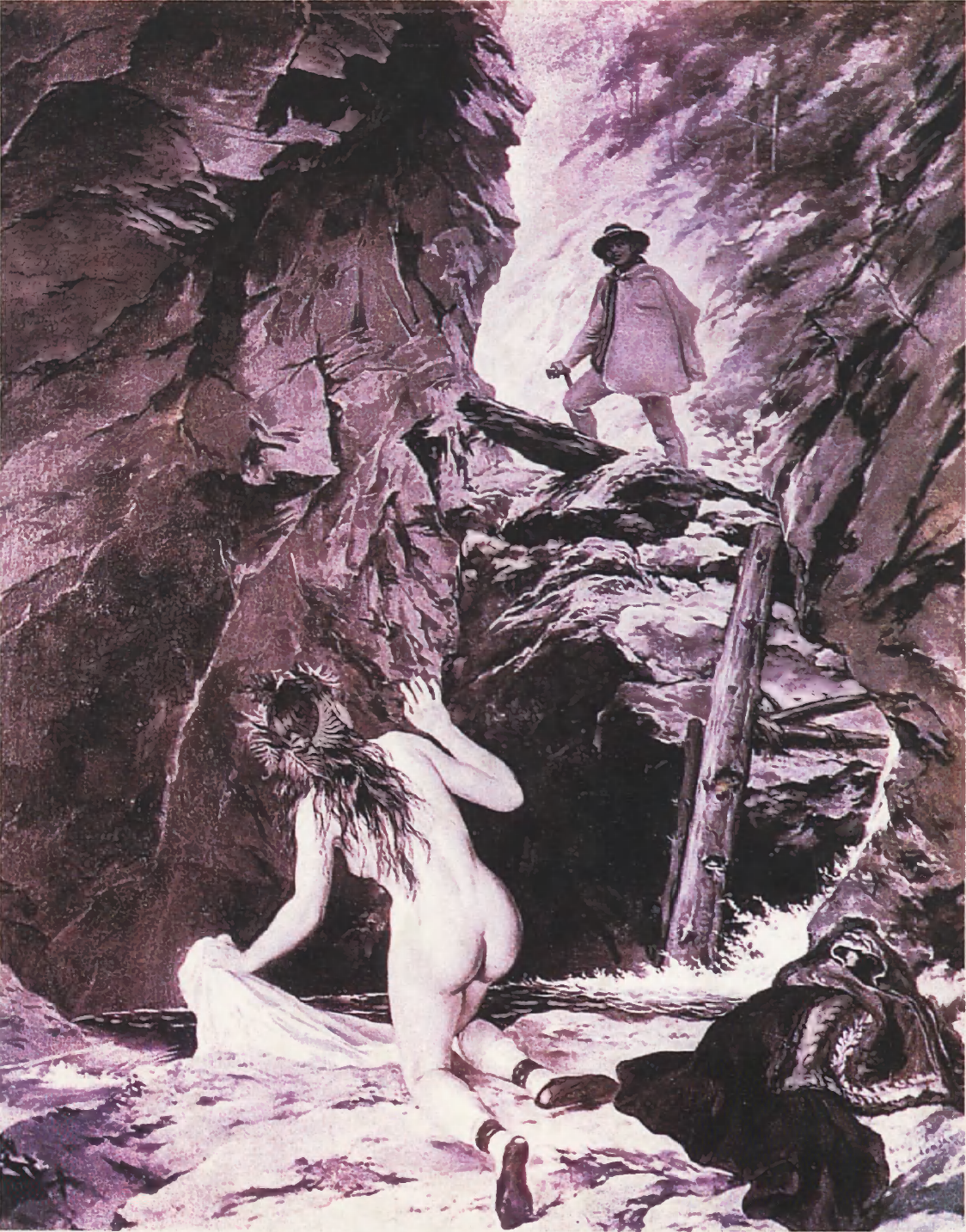
An encounter between Sabała and a mountain nymph, as imagined by Walery Eljasz

Sabała's folk tales (Polish: gawędy), both those invented by him and those he merely repeated after others, have been popularized by Stanisław Witkiewicz, Henryk Sienkiewicz, Wojciech Brzega and others, who have published them in numerous collections, including:

- Bajki według opowiadań Jana Sabały Krzeptowskiego z Kościeliska, Bronisław Dembowski, 1892
- Sabała. Portret, życiorys, bajki, powiastki, piosnki, melodie, Andrzej Stopka Nazimek, 1897.

Thanks to Sabała's friendship with some of the more renown Polish authors of late 19th and early 20th centuries, he was featured as a semi-fictional protagonist in numerous works of literature, including by Henryk Sienkiewicz (Sabałowa bajka, 1884), Stanisław Witkiewicz (Na przełęczy, 1891), Kazimierz Przerwa-Tetmajer (Legenda Tatr, 1910), Władysław Orkan (novella Przez co Sabała omijał jarmark w Kieżmarku), Jalu Kurek (Księga Tatr, 1955) and Józef Kapeniak (Ród Gąsieniców, 1954).

== Legacy ==
In 1903 a monument to both Sabała and Tytus Chałubiński was unveiled in Zakopane by the Association of Friends of Zakopane. The monument was designed by Stanisław Witkiewicz and sculpted by Jan Nalborczyk. Although Sabała was thought of as a background for Chałubiński, the monument is commonly referred to as Sabała's monument, not Chałubiński's. Since the bow of Sabała's gęśle was frequently being stolen by vandals, the fifth (created by artist blacksmith Władysław Gąsienica-Makowski) was attached to the monument with heavy bolts and marked with an inscription asking Vandal, do not take me.

In 1979 Sabała's house at Krzeptówki was turned into one of the branches of the Tatra Museum, it returned to private hands in the following years, but is still available for tourists.

There are streets named after Sabała in numerous Polish cities, including Zakopane, Warszawa, Bydgoszcz, Kraków, Łódź and Jelenia Góra. In Wolsztyn there is a ZHP troop named after him as well.

== Bibliography ==
- Pinkwart, Maciej (2004). Zakopane w 3 dni (in Polish). Warszawa: Sport i Turystyka - MUZA SA. ISBN 8373195793. OCLC 749259386.
- Wójcik, Wiesław A. (2009). Sabała (in Polish). Zakopane: Tatrzański Park Narodowy. ISBN 9788361788010. OCLC 739084837.
