= Marek Grechuta =

Polish singer

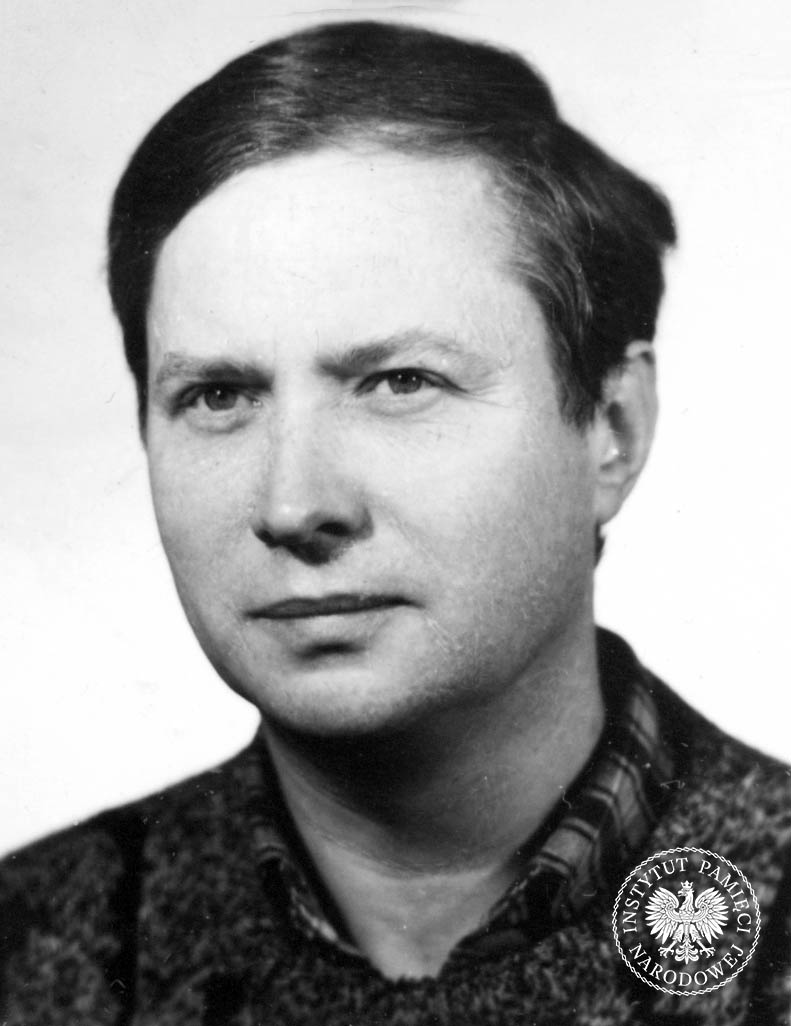
- Marek Grechuta (1980)

Background information
- Born: 10 December 1945; Zamość, Poland
- Died: 9 October 2006 (aged 60) Kraków, Poland
- Genres: Sung poetry, Progressive rock
- Occupations: Singer-songwriter, pianist
- Instruments: Piano, vocals
- Years active: 1967–2006
- Website: www.marekgrechuta.pl

Marek Michał Grechuta (10 December 1945 – 9 October 2006) was a Polish singer, songwriter, composer, and lyricist.

== Early life ==
Grechuta was born on 10 December 1945 in Zamość, Poland. He studied architecture at Tadeusz Kościuszko University of Technology in Kraków.

== Career ==
While studying at university, he met the composer Jan Kanty Pawluśkiewicz. Together, they founded the student cabaret Anawa in 1967. In the same year, Grechuta was placed second in the VI National Contest of Student Musicians (VI Ogólnopolski Konkurs Piosenkarzy Studenckich) and received an award for the album "Tango Anawa", with lyrics by him and music by Jan Kanty Pawluśkiewicz. In 1968, he won several awards at the Festival of Polish Music in Opole.

In 1969, Grechuta played a minor role in Andrzej Wajda's film Hunting Flies. In 1971, he left Anawa and founded the band WIEM (W Innej Epoce Muzycznej, In a Different Musical Era; note that wiem means I know in Polish).

Grechuta had many popular hits, often characterized by poetic and literary elements. Along with P. Birula and K. Szwajgier, he co-authored the music for Exodus (written by L. A. Moczulski) at the STU Theatre in Kraków (1974), and co-wrote the musical adaptation of Stanisław Ignacy Witkiewicz's Szalona lokomotywa (The Crazy Locomotive) with K. Jasiński and J. K. Pawluśkiewicz in 1977.

In 2003, Grechuta collaborated with the group Myslovitz and re-recorded their older song "Kraków". His song "Dni, których nie znamy" is commonly regarded as the unofficial anthem of the football club Korona Kielce.

== Personal life ==
In 1970, Grechuta married his wife, Danuta. They had a son, Łukasz.

He died on 9 October 2006 in Kraków and was buried in the Rakowicki Cemetery.

== Discography ==
Title	Album details	Peak chart positions
Title	Album details	POL
Marek Grechuta & Anawa	Released: February 1970; Label: Polskie Nagrania Muza; Formats: LP, CD, digital download	42
Korowód	Released: April 1971; Label: Polskie Nagrania Muza; Formats: LP, CD, digital download	—
Droga za widnokres	Released: 1972; Label: Polskie Nagrania Muza; Formats: LP, CD, digital download	—
Magia obłoków	Released: 1974; Label: Pronit; Formats: LP, CD, digital download	—
Szalona lokomotywa	Released: 1977; Label: Pronit; Formats: LP, CD	—
Pieśni M. Grechuty do słów Tadeusza Nowaka	Released: 1979; Label: Pronit; Formats: LP, CD	—
Śpiewające obrazy	Released: March 1981; Label: Pronit; Formats: LP, CD, digital download	—
W malinowym chruśniaku	Released: 1984; Label: Polskie Nagrania Muza; Formats: LP, CD	—
Wiosna – ach, to ty!	Released: 1987; Label: Polskie Nagrania Muza; Formats: LP, CD, digital download	—
Krajobraz pełen nadziei	Released: 1989; Label: Polskie Nagrania Muza; Formats: LP, CD	—
Jeszcze pożyjemy	Released: 1993; Label: Polskie Nagrania Muza; Formats: CD, digital download	—
Dziesięć ważnych słów	Released: 1994; Label: Markart; Formats: CD	—
Niezwykłe miejsca	Released: 8 December 2003; Label: EMI Music Poland; Formats: CD	—
"—" denotes a recording that did not chart or was not released in that territory.

== See also ==
- Sung poetry
