= Cenzopapa =

Polish internet meme

Participants of the Pyrkon Fantasy Festival singing “Barka” at 21:37. The performance references the tradition associated with Cenzopapa of singing “Barka” at this time in a satirical context.

Cenzopapa is a Polish internet meme phenomenon centered on mocking, insulting, or satirizing Pope John Paul II, objects and ideas associated with him. The term most commonly refers to images, but can also encompass videos, songs, copypastas, and computer games.

== Form and content ==
The main theme of cenzopapa revolves around depictions of Pope John Paul II as a pedophile, a thief, someone complicit in the September 11 attacks, or a criminal seeking to exterminate the Polish population. He has also been depicted alongside figures such as Adolf Hitler, Andrzej Duda, and Anders Behring Breivik. Some memes do not directly mock or insult John Paul II, but instead ridicule the cult surrounding him in Poland. Others are edited versions of documentary footage featuring statements by the pope. In memes, the pope is referred to both as John Paul II and by his birth name, Karol Wojtyła, as well as by numerous humorous nicknames, including Janusz Pawlacz III, Jan Pawulon, Warol Kojtyła, and Bestia z Wadowic ("The Beast of Wadowice").

=== Elements of the memes ===
A characteristic element of cenzopapa memes is a yellow depiction of the pope's face, known as the żółta morda ("yellow face"). The phrase is sometimes deliberately misspelled as rzułta morda. The hour 21:37, when John Paul II died, is a recurring motif, as is the number 2137. Another recurring element is the acronym JP2GMD, derived from the Polish phrase Jan Paweł II gwałcił małe dzieci ("John Paul II raped small children"). Numerous rhymes based on the phrase have appeared in cenzopapa memes, including Jan Arktos II więził ludzi Tabalugi and Jan Pawulon II zwiotczał małe mięśnie. These were partly a response to social media moderation practices, which regularly removed content containing the original phrase. Rhymes beginning with Ty Janie ("You, John") also became popular, including Ty Janie ukryty w złocie – wart całe krocie and Ty Janie DHL-u – paczek wielu niszczycielu. Other phrases combine unrelated contexts to produce absurdist humor. One example is Rewelacja znad Bałtyku – papież Polak na patyku ("A sensation from the Baltic – the Polish pope on a stick"), used as a caption for an image of John Paul II's face superimposed onto a popsicle. Another is Karol – człowiek, który został talerzem ("Karol – the man who became a plate"), used to describe a plate bearing an image of John Paul II. The phrase parodies the title of the film Karol: A Man Who Became Pope. Some memes use statements by John Paul II taken from the children's television programme Ziarno, including material from 1991. Napoleonka cream cakes are another recurring motif. The joke refers both to a statement made by John Paul II during his 1999 apostolic visit to Poland, when he recalled eating cream cakes with his friends after taking his secondary-school final examinations, and to the popularity of the cakes in his hometown of Wadowice. The time 21:37 is also associated with posts containing memes and jokes about Karol Wojtyła. At that time, some internet users have ironically performed "Barka", a song widely regarded in Poland as John Paul II's favourite hymn.

=== Copypastas ===
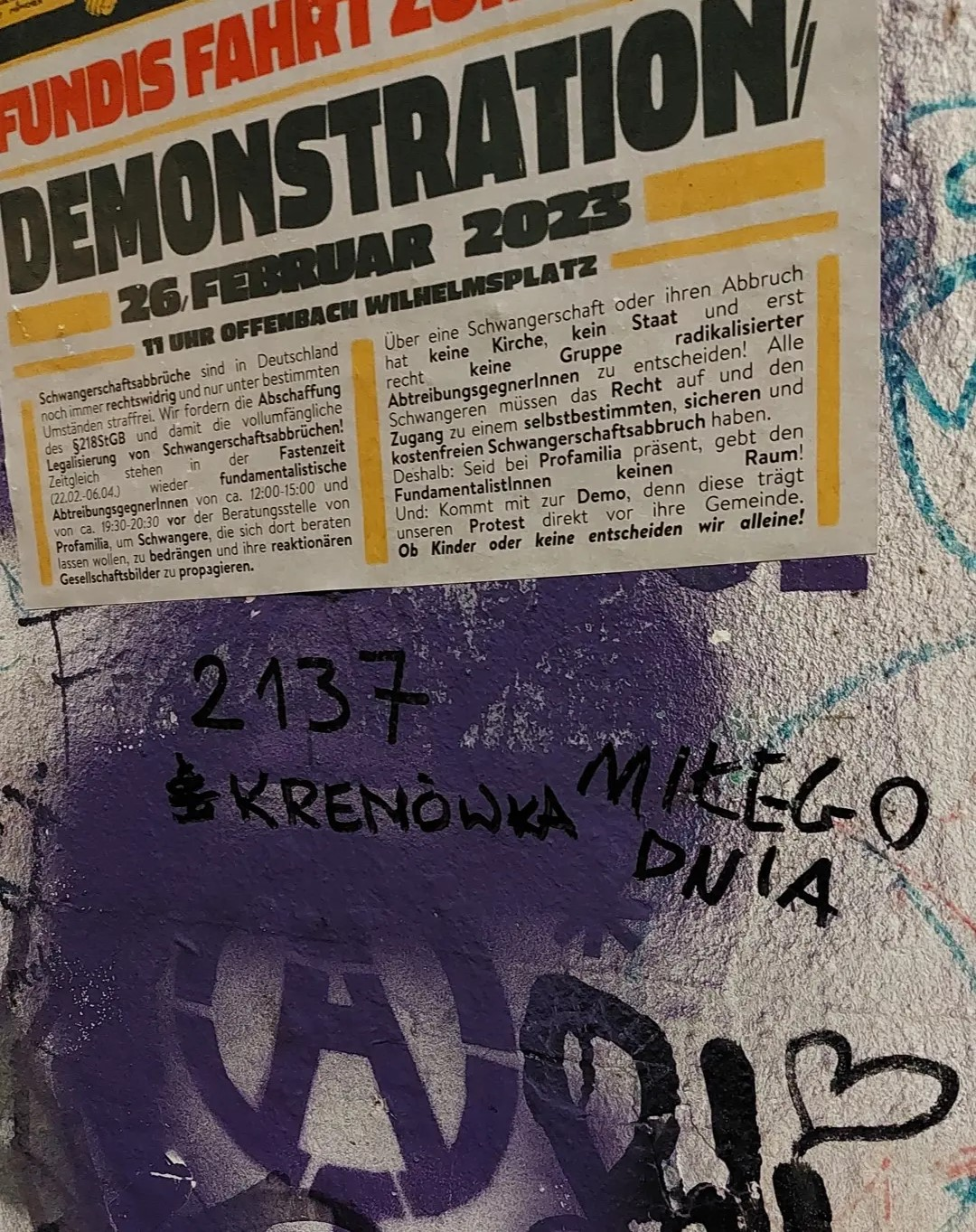
“21:37” and “kremówka” inscriptions referencing Cenzopapa.

Copypastas concerning John Paul II are also considered part of the cenzopapa phenomenon. One of the best-known is Pasta o rozumie i godności człowieka ("Pasta about reason and human dignity"), a fictional response written from the perspective of a deeply religious Polish Catholic who is outraged by memes concerning John Paul II. The copypasta became popular after an internet user called the interactive programme Rozmównica on the television station Religia.tv. After being connected with Dominican priest Paweł Gużyński, she began talking about the text. Another copypasta concerning John Paul II is Dziady cz. 2137. Kremówkarz Wojtyła. Its form is based on Forefathers' Eve, Part II by Adam Mickiewicz. In the parody, John Paul II is unable to enter heaven because he sexually abused children during his lifetime. Another copypasta features a character known as Komendant Wadowitz ("Commander Wadowitz"), who is presented as an allusion to John Paul II. In the story, the commander is responsible for an assault on a Polish village, the pacification of its inhabitants, and the destruction of a church. He is portrayed as hating the "Polish Catholic rabble". Other copypastas concerning Karol Wojtyła take the form of vulgar parodies of official devotional texts. The phrase rozum i godność człowieka ("reason and human dignity") and the abbreviation RiGCz, derived from Pasta o rozumie i godności człowieka, have entered Polish internet slang and are now used outside their original context. The verbs odjaniepawlać and odjaniepawlić (się) have likewise entered internet slang. According to the Polish Scientific Publishers PWN dictionary, odjaniepawlać refers to doing something nonsensical, sometimes harmful to others and surprising. The verbs were submitted to the 2017 Youth Word of the Year competition.

=== Videos, music and games ===
The cenzopapa phenomenon also includes videos, musical works—including parodies and hardstyle remixes—and computer games that portray John Paul II in a negative or absurd manner. A nine-minute video entitled Seryjni mordercy – Bestia z Wadowic ("Serial Killers – The Beast of Wadowice") is an edited fragment of a genuine documentary film into which photographs of John Paul II have been inserted. The video portrays the pope as a Nazi associated with the activities of Josef Mengele. Other works include the song Miasto Bestii Wadowice ("City of the Beast Wadowice"), a vulgar parody of the song Moje miasto Wadowice, and the series Papajaka Watykaniaka, in which John Paul II is portrayed as a pedophile. Music albums such as Hardbass Wadowice and 2138 have also been released. Their recurring themes include statements by John Paul II and statements by people associated with him. Two amateur platform games entitled Wolyn Assault feature the player as the pope and require the player to complete a mission in Volhynia. In The Medium, developed by the Kraków-based studio Bloober Team, one location originally contained the inscription "Bestia z Wadowic". After players discovered it and the issue was reported by the media, the inscription was removed. A computer virus known as Watykańczyk also exists. Among other effects, it displays John Paul II memes on the computer desktop and plays Barka.

== History ==
The first cenzopapa memes appeared on Polish imageboards around 2009. They initially constituted a form of internet trolling intended primarily to shock or outrage the recipient. Because John Paul II was a highly revered figure among a large part of Polish society, he was regarded as an especially effective target for this type of trolling. Alongside the comedy series Kapitan Bomba, cenzopapa has been described as a Polish example of shock comedy, a form of comedy in which jokes are intended to shock the audience. Early cenzopapa content primarily consisted of pornographic images in which John Paul II's face was superimposed over intimate areas or over the faces of actors. Over time, the term came to encompass a wider range of memes concerning the pope, while the content became less explicitly pornographic. Some of the material was marked with the logo of Wykop.pl. However, the material was not actually created by users of the website but by users of imageboards, who were in conflict with Wykop.pl.

== Reasons for the phenomenon ==
Cenzopapa initially developed as a form of internet trolling intended to provoke shock or outrage. John Paul II's exceptional social status and the reverence surrounding him among a substantial part of Polish society made him a particularly attractive target for this type of activity. Researchers of internet culture Marcin Garbowski and Maciej Kapek have interpreted cenzopapa memes as a reaction to the cult of John Paul II in Poland and to what they regard as excessive reverence for the pope. They have also been interpreted as provocation directed at older people or people who are more sensitive to blasphemous material, as well as a form of youthful rebellion. Memes depicting John Paul II as a pedophile have been interpreted as a response to scandals involving child sexual abuse in the Catholic Church and allegations that such abuse was concealed by church authorities. The popularity of 21:37 has been linked to the extensive media coverage of John Paul II's final days. Journalists in the Vatican reported continuously to Polish audiences on the pope's deteriorating health and final days, making the time of his death particularly prominent in Polish popular culture.

== Online reactions ==
Some cenzopapa material has been reported by users and removed by moderators of online platforms. A Facebook fan page entitled Jan Paweł Drugi zajebał mi szlugi ("John Paul II stole my cigarettes") existed in 2012–2013 and was repeatedly suspended by Facebook administrators. Controversy arose in 2016 over a Facebook event entitled Mistrzostwa Polski w szkalowaniu papieża ("Polish Championship in Insulting the Pope"), which was scheduled for 2 April 2017 at 21:37. The National Committee for the Defense Against Sects and Violence, headed by Ryszard Nowak, notified the Prosecutor General of Poland of what it considered an insult to John Paul II. The case was referred to the Warsaw-Mokotów District Prosecutor's Office, which found no criminal violation. According to the prosecutor's decision, the users had not violated John Paul II's good name because, under the relevant legal interpretation, "only a living person can be insulted". In 2017, some internet users celebrated the staging of The Curse (Klątwa), directed by Croatian theatre director Oliver Frljić, interpreting it as an example of cenzopapa entering the realm of "high culture". Attempts were also made to create English-language versions of cenzopapa, but the resulting memes did not achieve comparable popularity.

== In popular culture ==
The character Jan Paweł Adamczewski, the protagonist of the Polish comedy series 1670, has been interpreted as a reference to cenzopapa. Adamczewski is portrayed as a stereotypical Polish nobleman whose ambition is to become "the most famous Jan Paweł in the history of Poland".

== See also ==
- Sinéad O'Connor on Saturday Night Live, incident involving Sinéad O'Connor where she ripped up a photo of John Paul II
