= HD 41162 =

Binary star in the constellation Auriga

Observation data Epoch J2000 Equinox J2000
- Constellation: Auriga
- Right ascension: 06^{h} 05^{m} 02.58111^{s}
- Declination: +37° 57′ 51.3994″
- Apparent magnitude (V): 6.32

Characteristics
- Spectral type: G8III + F0V:
- Apparent magnitude (G): 6.12
- B−V color index: +0.825±0.005

Astrometry
| Radial velocity (R_{v}) | −1.85±0.17 km/s |
| Proper motion (μ) | RA: −4.757±0.189 mas/yr Dec.: −7.907±0.145 mas/yr |
| Parallax (π) | 4.5368±0.2252 mas |
| Distance | 720 ± 40 ly (220 ± 10 pc) |
| Absolute magnitude (M_{V}) | 0.08 |

Details

A
| Radius | 7.21+0.25 −0.12 R_{☉} |
| Luminosity | 33.8±1.6 L_{☉} |
| Temperature | 5,181+45 −88 K |
| Rotational velocity (v sin i) | 1.2±1.3 km/s |

Other designations
- BD+37 1405, HD 41162, HIP 28820, HR 2137, SAO 58716

Database references
| SIMBAD | data |

HD 41162 is a binary star in the northern constellation Auriga. At a combined apparent visual magnitude of 6.32, the system is visible to the naked eye. It is located about 720 light-years (220 pc) away.

The primary is a G-type giant star which has expanded to about 7.21 solar radii. It radiates about 33.8 times the Sun's luminosity at a temperature of around 5,181 K. The secondary is an F-type star.
