= Do Rzeczy =

Polish weekly news magazine

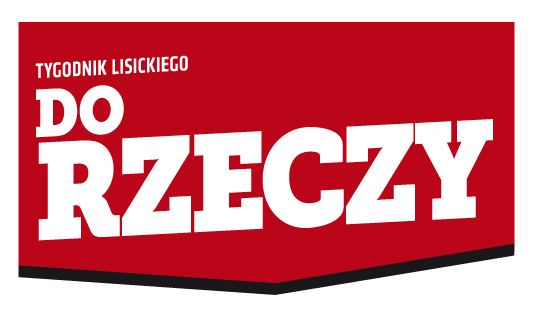
- Logo of Do Rzeczy
- Editor-in-chief: Paweł Lisicki
- Political alignment: Right-wing to far-right
- Categories: News magazine Political magazine
- Frequency: Weekly
- Publisher: Orle Pióro
- Founder: Paweł Lisicki
- Founded: 2013; 13 years ago
- Country: Poland
- Based in: Warsaw
- Language: Polish
- Website: Do Rzeczy

Do Rzeczy (Polish: [dɔ ˈʐɛt͡ʂɨ]; lit. 'To the point') is a Polish-language conservative weekly news and political magazine published in Warsaw, Poland. It often promotes the PiS party narrative.

== History and profile ==
Do Rzeczy was established in January 2013 by Paweł Lisicki and a group of journalists who previously worked for the weekly magazine Uważam Rze. The magazine is published on a weekly basis and has its headquarters in Warsaw.

== Political stances ==
The magazine has been described as right-wing. It has been variously considered to espouse Christian, conservative-liberal, ultra-conservative and Catholic fundamentalist views.

The magazine has also supported pro-Polexit, nationalist and hard eurosceptic stances.

It has also published articles with strong anti-LGBT rhetoric, warning that Poland is in danger of a "LGBT dictatorship". It has also claimed that feminism has communist ideological foundations.

== See also ==
- List of magazines in Poland
