= ZEN.com =

International fintech company

ZEN.COM
- Company type: Private Limited Company
- Industry: Fintech
- Founded: 2018
- Founder: Dawid Rożek
- Headquarters: London, United Kingdom
- Area served: Europe (28 countries); Asia
- Website: zen.com

Headquarters in London

ZEN.COM is a financial technology (fintech) company headquartered in London, United Kingdom. It was founded in 2018 by Dawid Rożek, also known as a co-founder of G2A.COM Ltd.. It has offices in London, Hong Kong, Singapore, Warsaw, Arnhem, and Vilnius.

== History ==
The company obtained an Electronic Money Institution (EMI) license issued by the Bank of Lithuania on May 24, 2018. Public launch of services took place in November 2020. In 2022 ZEN.COM replaced discontinued G2A PAY service. In 2024, the company was granted a major payment institution license by the Monetary Authority of Singapore. In August 2024, Zen UK Limited was authorized as an Electronic Money Institution by the Financial Conduct Authority (FCA) in the United Kingdom. In 2025, former President of Poland, Andrzej Duda joined the board. According to data published by the Bank of Lithuania for the third quarter of 2025, ZEN.COM held a 16,94% share of revenue among independent electronic money institutions operating in Lithuania.
