= Gąsienica =

Gąsienica is a Polish-language surname common among the Goral population of Zakopane region literally meaning "caterpillar".

The commonality of this surname is reflected in the following question-answer joke: "Why does cabbage not grow in Zakopane? – Because there are too many Caterpillars!" For the same reason Gorals use double-barrelled names, for better identification.

== People ==
- Agnieszka Gąsienica-Daniel (born 1987), Polish alpine skier
- Andrzej Gąsienica-Makowski (born 1952), Polish politician
- Andrzej Gąsienica Roj (1930–1989), Polish alpine skier
- Franciszek Gąsienica Groń (1931–2014), Polish Nordic-combined skier
- Helena Gąsienica Daniel (1934–2013), Polish cross-country skier
- Jan Gąsienica (Sabała) (1809–1894), Polish poet
- Jan Gąsienica Ciaptak (1922–2009), Polish alpine skier
- Józef Gąsienica (1941–2005), Polish Nordic-combined skier
- Józef Gąsienica-Sobczak (1934–2026), Polish biathlete and cross-country skier
- Maria Gąsienica Bukowa-Kowalska (1936–2020), Polish cross-country skier
- Maria Gąsienica Daniel-Szatkowska (1936–2016), Polish alpine skier
- Maryna Gąsienica-Daniel (born 1994), Polish alpine skier
- Stanisław Gąsienica Daniel (born 1951), Polish ski jumper
