= Gazeta Krakowska =

Polska Gazeta Krakowska
- Logo
- Type: Newspaper
- Format: Broadsheet
- Owner: Polskapresse Sp. z o.o. Kraków
- Publisher: Polskapresse Publishing Group
- Editor-in-chief: Tomasz Lachowicz
- Founded: 1949
- Language: Polish
- Headquarters: Kraków, Poland
- ISSN: 1898-3138
- Website: gazetakrakowska.pl

The Gazeta Krakowska (Polish pronunciation: [ɡaˈzɛ.ta kraˈkɔf.ska], full title Polska Gazeta Krakowska [ˈpɔl.ska ɡaˈzɛ.ta kraˈkɔf.ska]) is the largest regional daily newspaper in Kraków, Poland, published five times a week in that city. Gazeta Krakowska was established on 15 February 1949. It features articles about politics, business, economy, popular history, culture, society and sports, entertainment, as well as advertising.

== Background ==
Even though, Krakowska has been in circulation since 1949, the very name appeared for the first time already in 1794 during the Kościuszko Insurrection. In 1981 the newspaper Krakowska became an icon of unbiased, independent information about the Solidarity movement, serving as popular platform for conveying striking workers' demands as well as the political commentaries against the official communist party line. At that crucial period in Polish postwar history, Maciej Szumowski served as its editor-in-chief. At present Polska Gazeta Krakowska (Poland's Newspaper Krakowska) is the most important regional newspaper of Lesser Poland.

== Overview ==
Gazeta Krakowska is produced by a branch of Polskapresse Publishing Group called Prasa Krakowska. At first, the newspaper was part of a publishing conglomerate owned by the Polish United Workers' Party. Between 1 July 1975, and 30 December 1980 it appeared under the title Gazeta Południowa. Its first editor-in-chief was Arnold Mostowicz. Currently (2008) the paper, owned by Polskapresse, is managed by Tomasz Lachowicz, its new editor-in-chief. Since 15 October 2007, Krakowska appears within the national newspaper chain called "Polska (dziennik)".
