= Lord, You Have Come to the Lakeshore =

1974 Spanish religious song

"Lord, You Have Come to the Lakeshore" (Spanish: "Pescador de hombres", lit. 'Fisher of Men'), in some versions "You Have Come to the Seashore", is a 1974 Spanish religious song by Cesáreo Gabaráin. It was translated into English by Gertrude C. Suppe, George Lockwood and Raquel Gutiérrez-Achon.

"Barka" ('The Barge'), its Polish version, was Pope John Paul II's favourite song. The Polish lyrics were written also in 1974 by Stanisław Szmidt, a Salesian of Don Bosco.

== In popular culture ==
The song is used in episode 6 of season 4 of the Netflix television series Money Heist. In the Peruvian series Al fondo hay sitio, the family and neighbors of Diego Montalbán sing this song while his coffin was lowered, preparing to be buried alive.

=== Cenzopapa ===
In internet culture associated with Cenzopapa, 9:37 p.m (21:37) has also become an occasion for the ironic or mocking performance of "Barka", referencing the time of Pope John Paul II's death. The practice also occurs offline, including at events and gatherings.
