= Dni, których nie znamy =

1971 song by Marek Grechuta

Single by Marek Grechuta

from the album Korowód
- Released: 1971
- Recorded: 1971
- Genre: sung poetry
- Length: 4:52
- Label: Polskie Nagrania Muza
- Songwriters: Marek Grechuta (lyrics); Jan Kanty Pawluśkiewicz (music)

Marek Grechuta singles chronology
"Nowy radosny dzień" (1971)	"Dni, których nie znamy" (1971)	"Ocalić od zapomnienia" (1971)

Audio
- "Dni, których nie znamy" on YouTube

"Dni, których nie znamy" (Polish: [ˈdɲ ˈktu.rɘx ˈɲɛ ˈzna.mɘ̟]; lit. 'Days, that we don't know yet') is a Polish-language song written by Marek Grechuta and composed by Jan Kanty Pawluśkiewicz. The song was published by Polskie Nagrania Muza in 1971 on the album Korowód made by the Grechuta together with an instrumental band Anawa.

== In popular culture ==
The song has become one of the most popular entertainment songs written in Polish. It was covered by many artists including: Michał Bajor, Kr'shna Brothers, Meza, Anna Treter, Plateau, and Kamil Bednarek, as well as duets of Grzegorz Turnau and Dorota Miśkiewicz, and Maryla Rodowicz and Piotr Kupicha.

It is commonly regarded among the fans of Korona Kielce football club as its unofficial anthem.

The song was used in the 2000 film Boys Don't Cry, 2005 film Angel in Love, and 2016 film Planet Single. It was also used in the 2015 short film Twardowsky which was part of film series Polish Legends.
