= Danuta Mizgalska =

Polish singer

Danuta Mizgalska is Polish singer from Poznań.

== Biography ==
She made her debut in Potocki's: Trends (Polish - Prady), 1971 in Poznań. She graduated from the School of Arts running by Estrada Poznań under Jerzy Milian and Zbigniew Gorny directory. For short time she joined Stoleczna Estrada, then moved to the Air Force band "Estrada. After two years working with them she decided to start her solo career.

Her debut song Nasz usmiech losu (The Luck of Fate), H.Kuczynski L.Konopinski was recorded with the Radio and Television Orchestra, conducted by J. Milian in Katowice. The song was promoted by the music director of Lato z Radiem (The summer with the Radio) Michael Rybczynski, and become one of the biggest Hit in 1978. On another music program, Studio Gama (Studio Keys), her song, Moze ja –moze ty (Maybe I Maybe You) reached the top position. Early in her career she worked with the J.Miliana's and St.Rachonia's Orchestras. Most of her songs were recorded in studio: Katowice, Warsaw, Poznań and Łódź. Mizgalska's songs were played very frequently on the radio and TV, e.g. on Mieczyslaw Fogg and Jerzy Polomski programs. Her songs were often heard and seen on the popular radio and television Koncert Zyczen (Concert of Wishes). She recorded three TV recitals. In June 1983 years TV Warsaw presented her recital Dziewczyna taka jak ja (A girl like me ), directed by A. Minkiewicz.

She returned to performing her song San Francisco on the National Festival of Polish Song in Opole in 1992.

Danuta Mizgalska recorded more than 150 songs, including big hits, Jestem Twoja Lady (I'm Your Lady), Casablanca, Okruchy wspomnien (Pieces of Memory), Nasz usmiech losu (The Luck of Fate,), Dziewczyna taka jak ja (A girl like me). She also sings a number of the international hits : Ze wspomnien zostal ledwie slad (The memories have been scarcely traced) - (Blue Bayou - Roy Orbison); Swiat bez milosci (World Without Love) - Italian hit Alice); Kolysz moje sny (Sway my dreams) - (Love me tender - Elvis Presley). Mizgalska performed numerous of concerts nationally and internationally, and she is fascinated by Japan and Singapore culture.

Some of her songwriters are,: Jaroslaw Kukulski, Jacek Skubikowski, Jerzy Milian, Janusz Piatkowski, Andrew Sobczak, Richard Kniat, A. Kosmala, Lech Konopinski. At some concert she sang with other artists who came from Poznań: Eleni Tzoka, Halina Frackowiak, Anna Jantar. Mizgalska with those artists was the honorary member of the Anna Jantar Music Club, whose president was Agata Materowicz.

== Discography ==
=== Singles ===
S 173 Tonpress, 1979

- 1. Maybe I Maybe You (Może ja może ty)
- 2. The memories have been scarcely traced (Ze wspomnień został ledwie ślad)

R 0981 Tonpress

- 1. A girl like me (Dziewczyna taka jak ja)

R 0687-II

- 1. The Luck of Fate (Nasz uśmiech losu)
- 2. You Wanted you Got it (Chciałeś masz)

=== Albums ===
Pronit PLP 0072, 1985. "Pieces of Memory (Okruchy wspomnień)”

Side A

- 1. Pieces of Memory (Okruchy wspomnień)
- 2. I leave the grief behind (Odkładam żal)
- 3. Deep of your smile (W głębi uśmiechu)
- 4. Don't say my baby (Nie mów mały)
- 5. Not that street (Nie ta ulica)

Side B

- 1. Only one home (Tylko jeden dom)
- 2. A plate of honey (Talerzyk miodu)
- 3. The Luck of Fate (Nasz uśmiech losu)
- 4. Artificial light in the city (Miasto w sztucznym świetle)
- 5. Take my whole world (Weź mój cały świat)
- 6. A story of one relationship (Historia jednej znajomości)

Cd Konstech – Records 100691 CD, 1990 "I'm Your Lady (Jestem Twoją Lady)” (and an earlier the vinyl album with the same title and the number, Konstech Records KRLP 001)

- 1. I'm Your Lady (Jestem Twoją Lady)
- 2. Bring positivity into your life (Pogodę w życie nieś)
- 3. It's not always like this (Nie zawsze tak jest)
- 4. Stay with me for a while (Zostań ze mną chwilę)
- 5. San Francisco
- 6. Anna Maria (cover Czerwonych Gitar)
- 7. When you're alone again (Kiedy jesteś znów sam)
- 8. Where is that flower (Gdzie jest tamten kwiat)
- 9. The memories have been scarcely traced (Ze wspomnień został ledwie ślad)
- 10. When the City lights (Kiedy światła miasta)

Mc BRAWO P 101, 1991, „Christmas Carols (Kolędy)”

Side A

- 1. When Lovely Lady (Gdy śliczna Panna)
- 2. Little Jesus (Jezus Malusieńki)
- 3. To Shed hey Shepherds (Do szopy hej pasterze)
- 4. Let's All Go to the Stable (Pójdźmy wszyscy do stajenki)
- 5. Sleep Little Baby Jesus (Lulajże Jezuniu)

Side B

- 1. Among Silent Night (Wśród nocnej ciszy)
- 2. Silent Night (Cicha noc)
- 3. On this day of Nativity (Hej w dzień Narodzenia)
- 4. They came to Bethlehem (Przybieżeli do Betlejem)

CD (no publisher presented on the CD cover) „For You (Dla Ciebie)”

- 1. I'm Your Lady (Jestem Twoją Lady)
- 2. Only one home (Tylko jeden dom)
- 3. Pieces of Memory (Okruchy wspomnień)
- 4. Stay with me for a while (Zostań ze mną chwilę)
- 5. When you're alone again (Kiedy jesteś znów sam)
- 6. A story of one relationship (Historia jednej znajomości)
- 7. It's not always like this (Nie zawsze tak jest)
- 8. The memories have been scarcely traced (Ze wspomnień został ledwie ślad)
- 9. Take my whole world (Weź mój cały świat)
- 10. San Francisco
- 11. Third year (Trzeci rok)

== Other References ==
- Official website - Danuta Mizgalska
- Facebook Danuta Mizgalska
- Information about Danuta Mizgalska Bloog Danuta Mizgalska
- Danuta Mizglalska Discogs Danuta Mizgalska
- Concert- Danuta Mizgalska Nasze miasto, July 2011, Danuta Mizgalska Recital
- Biography LostFm, Danuta Mizgalska
- Songs Mizgalska Songs
- Lyrics
- Song Song - Swiat bez milosci (World Without Love)
- Third Year Danuta Mizgalska song
- An Evening with the Star epoznan.pl 2012 October, Danuta Mizgalska Concert
- Recital Danuta Mizgalska, Vancouver, October 2013
