= Agata Materowicz =

Polish artist

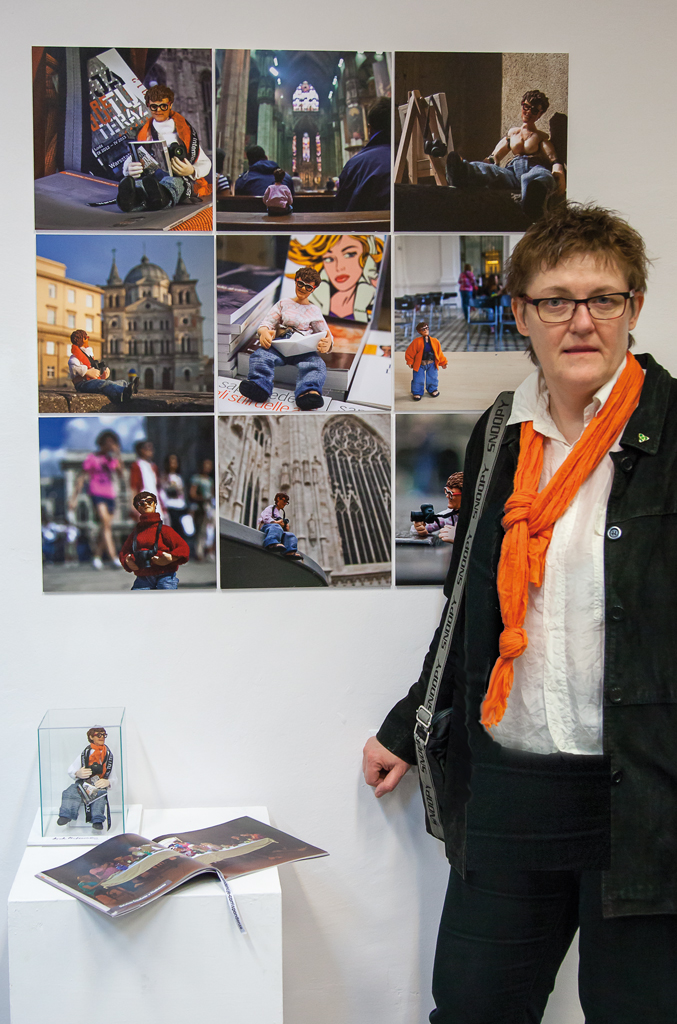
- 5 International Festival Art & Documentation, 2013, Łódź, Poland
- Born: 1963 (age 62–63)
- Education: Faculty of Visual Arts at Academy of Fine Arts in Łódź, Poland; University Of Computer Sciences and Skills, Łódź, Poland
- Known for: Artist
- Website: Agata Materowicz Facebook

Agata Materowicz (born 1963) is a contemporary Polish artist. She is a multi-disciplinary artist specialises in oil painting, including copies of masterworks and portraits painting, animation, puppetry, installation art, photography, sculpture, drawing, graphic design and others.

== Biography ==
Born in Warsaw, Materowicz received her MFA in Visual Arts (Puppet Animation, Painting and Drawing) from the Academy of Fine Arts, and BFA in Computer Graphic Design from University Of Computer Sciences and Skills, both in Łódź, Poland. Materowicz graduated with honours from the Faculty of Visual Arts at Academy of Fine Arts in Łódź, Poland. She achieved top marks for her(Girl Reading a Letter at an Open Window – Johannes Vermeer's) project and theory thesis assignments: "Puppet for Film Animation" Faculty of Puppet Animation, promoter prof. Marek Skrobecki and "Painting for the Scenography of the Animated Film" Faculty of Painting and Drawing, promoter prof. Jolanta Wagner. Contemporary Multimedia Artist. She is very active in the following art areas: photography, painting, sculpture, ceramics, illustrations, computer graphics art, design and editorial. She illustrated children's book and also some of them designed and published. The author of several scientific articles and publications including copyright infringement. She gained her Computer Graphic Design Bachelor of Arts from the WSInf, Łódź. She has also Diploma of Landscape Architecture- Warsaw College of Architecture, Diploma of Marketing- Ciechanow Collage of Marketing, Diploma of Architecture – Warsaw Collage. She received the certificate – ArtCamp Digital Photography / Open Air-International Summer School of Art, University of West Bohemia – Czech Republic. – University of West Bohemia in Plzeň and the certificate of the Academy of Photography in Warsaw. She also holds a certificate of Internet Marketing, Adobe, Corel Draw, computer graphics, web design organised by Apple. In the 1980s she was the co-founder and then president of the Music Club. Anna Jantar "Bursztyn"and as the chairman she organized concerts, authors readings and exhibitions. Honorary Members of the Club were: Jarosław Kukulski, Natalia Kukulska, Eleni Tzoka, Halina Frackowiak, Romuald Lipko, Zbigniew Holdys, Marek Karewicz, Michal Rybczynski, Danuta Mizgalska. From 1985 to 1987 Agata worked as a graphic editor for "Weekly Ciechanowski". In 1991, she was co-founded of the "Association of Painters and Sculptors – Warsaw Old Town". She was the Photography Instructor teaching young people techniques how to see things differently.

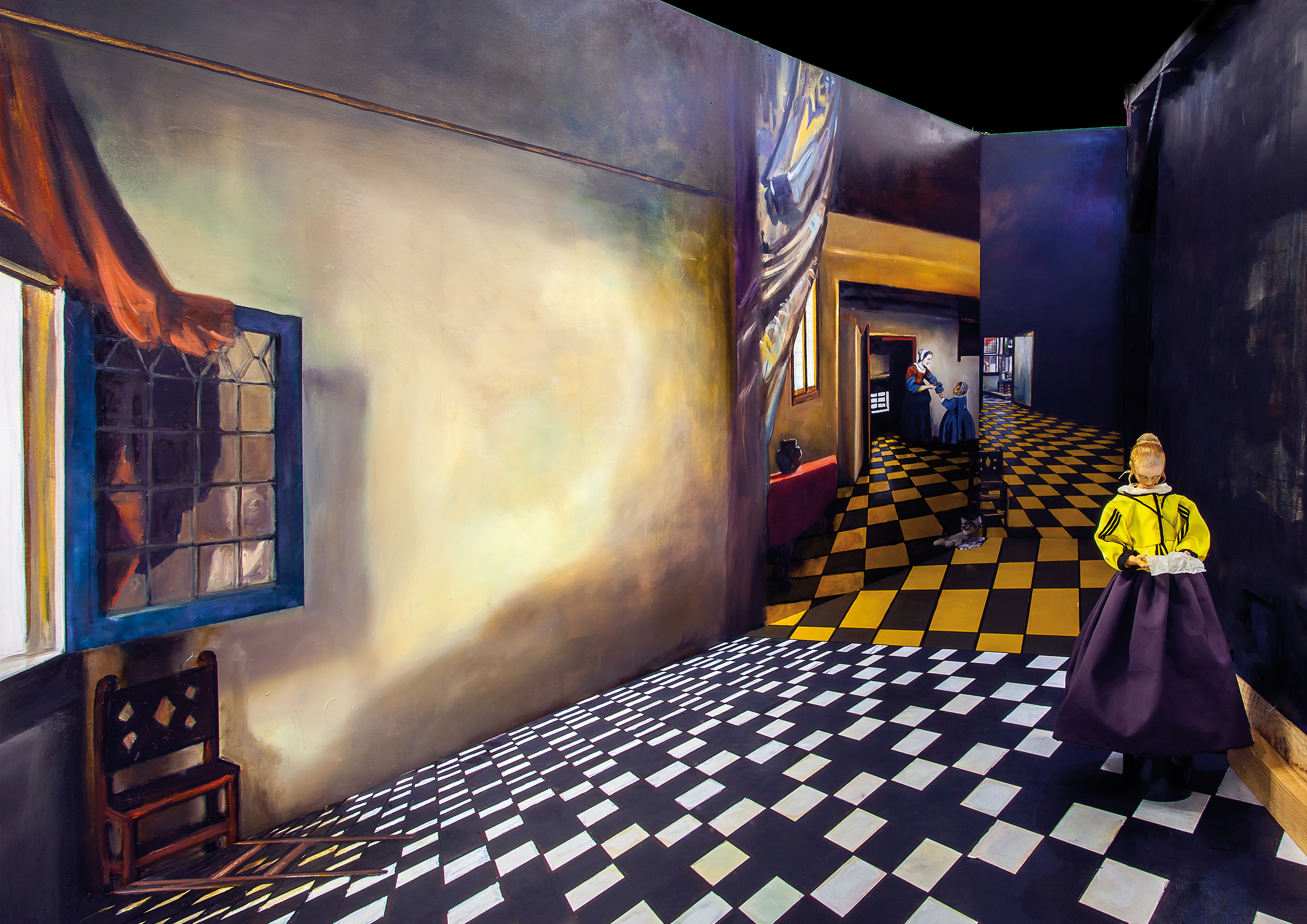
Painting Scenography and Animated Puppet prepared for a movie based on Johannes Vermeer's Girl Reading a Letter at an Open Window, (2013)

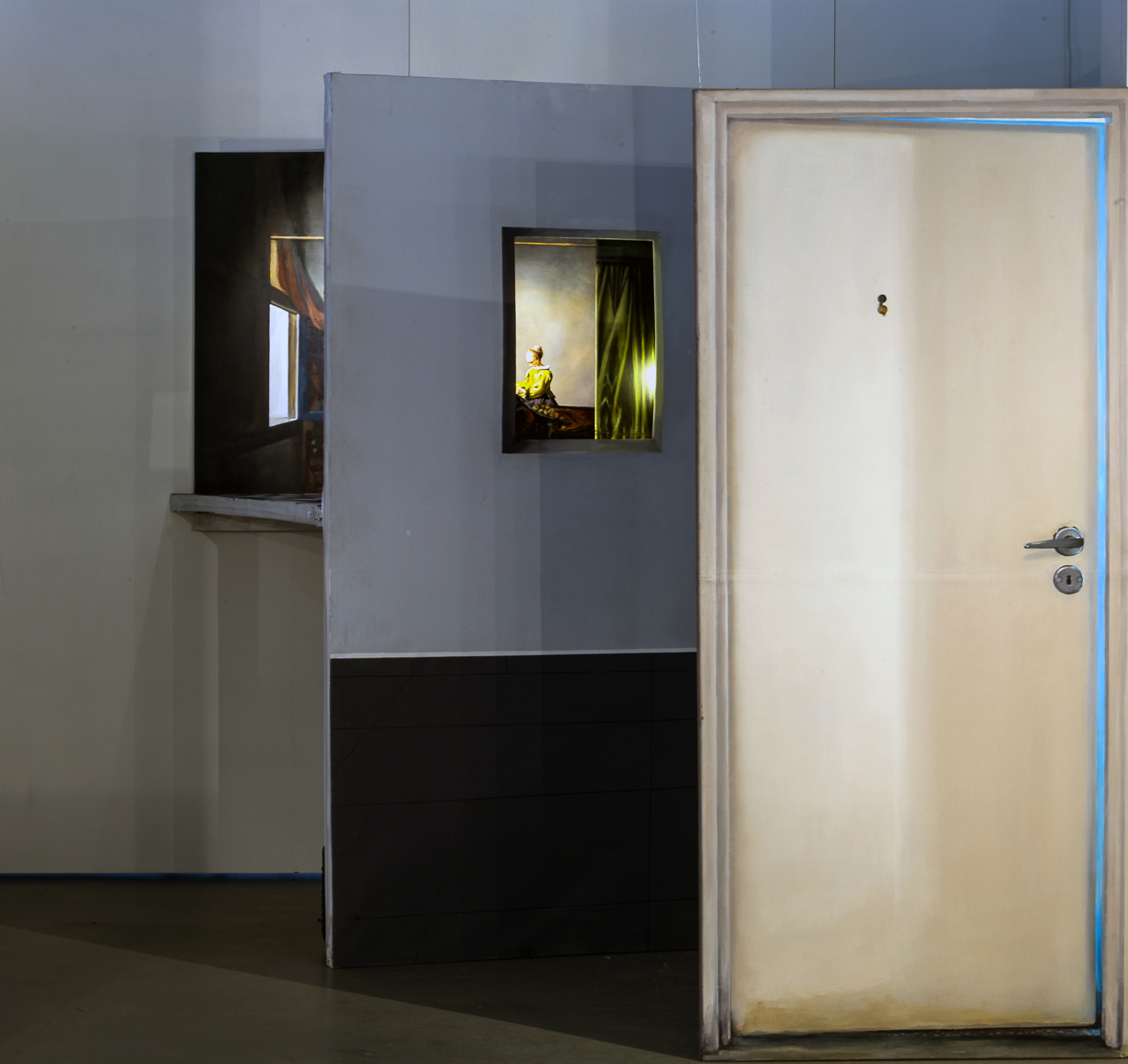
Painting Scenography and Animated Puppet prepared for a movie based on Johannes Vermeer's Girl Reading a Letter at an Open Window, (2013)

== Awards and honors ==
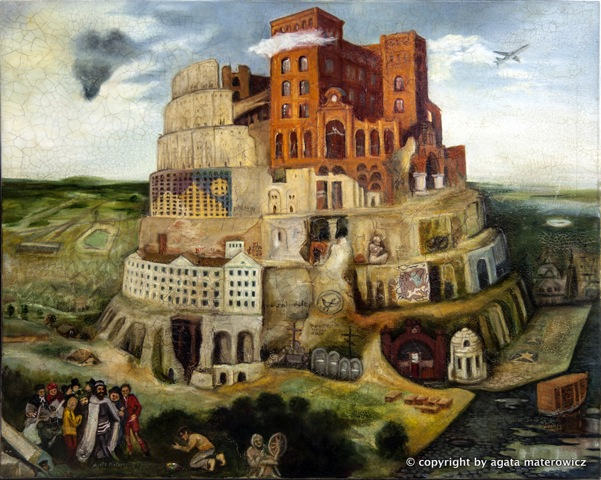
Łódzka Tower of Babel, based on a Pieter Bruegel the Elder masterpiece, Łódź, (2012)

- 2014 – Scenography, puppets: design and construction for Natalia Kukulska video "Headdress" (Polish: Pioropusz)
- 2013 -Master's Degree, project: "Illusions in Art – the road from painting to the movie" – nominated for the Best Fine Arts Diploma in Poland, Diplomas 2013
- 2012 – Art Scholarships for her outstanding achievements: from the Polish Minister of Science and Higher Education
- 2012 – Art Scholarships from the Marshal of Łódź Region in 2013
- 2011 – Award Gallery Kobro in 29 Strzeminskiego Competition at ASP Łódź
- 2006 – Award Photo Competition "Mokotow", Warsaw
- 2007 – Award Photo Competition "My way of seeing Warsaw". Awarded photo was promoted the city of Warsaw on billboards, citylighs and other promotional materials in Poland and aboard.
- 2004 – Winner ADDage.com Logo Competition (USA)
- 1979 – Silver Medal at Shankar's International Children's Competition, New Delhi, India

== Solo exhibitions ==
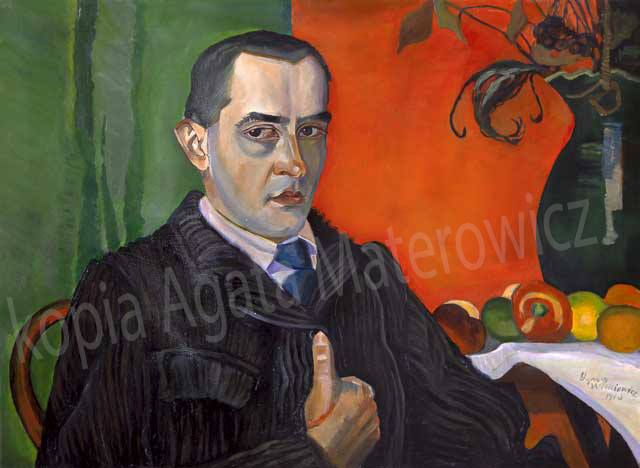
Copy of Witlkacy self-portrait from 1913, Stanisław Ignacy Witkiewicz, Łódź, (2014)

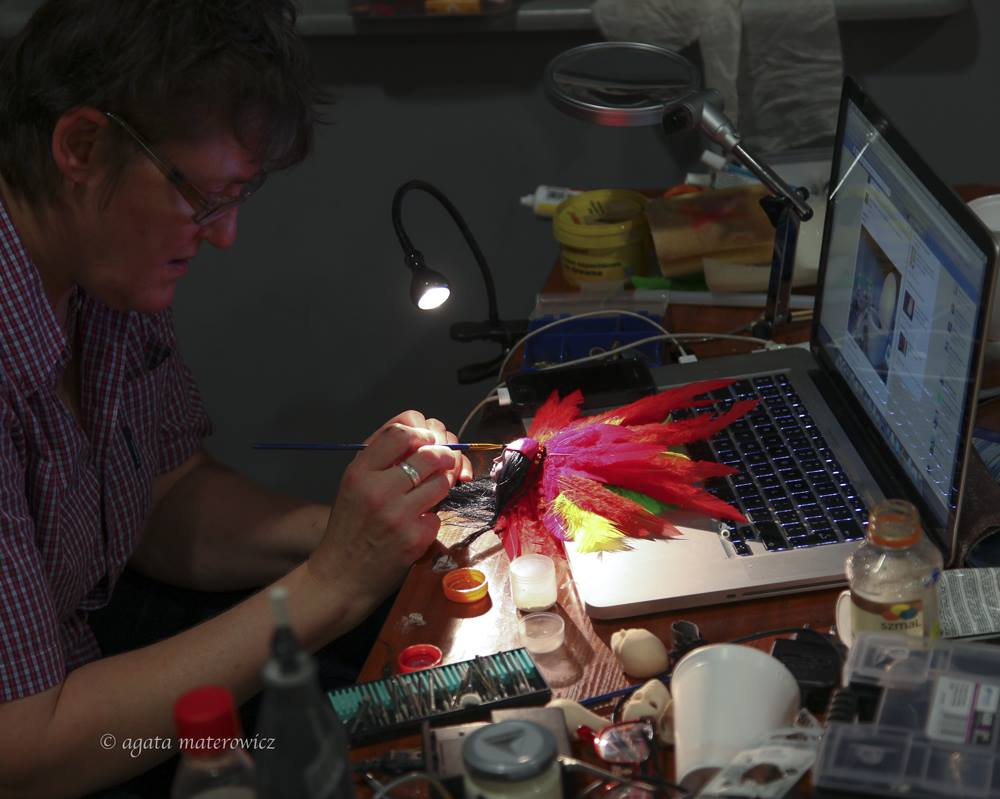
During music video production: Pioropusz, Natalia Kukulska, (2014)

- 2013 – "Alter Ego" – Photo Exhibition at Parramatta Art Gallery Sydney – Australia – July 2013
- 2007 – "The Four Eyes" – Art Gallery „Ogrod” – Jablonna
- 1998 – Polish Art and Handicrafts Exhibition – Trade Formex '98 in Stockholm
- 1987 – "Fimo World of Agata Materowicz” Cultural Centre in Ciechanów
- 1984 – "Anna Jantar- First Step- Last Step” at the Students Club „Stodola” – Warsaw, then moved to Lublin, Łódź, Kraków. Poznań

== Group exhibitions ==
- 2015 – The Spring Arts & Heritage Centre, Havant, UK
- 2014 – Gallery Neon "Łódź z Łódzi" (eng: Boat from Boat), Wrocław
- 2014 – Museum of Textiles "Prime Time", Łódź
- 2013 – International Festiwal "Art & Documentation", Łódź
- 2013 – Exhibition:"Boat from Łódź". Work exhibition- "Brick Boat", Strzegom
- 2013 – Professors and students post symposium exhibition:"Me, Here and Now" Gallery Kobro – Łódź
- 2012 – Participant's exhibition ArtCamp Digital Photography/ Open Air– International Summer School of Art. University of West Bohemia – Plzen, Czech Republic
- 2012 – Exhibition: „Łódź, the Transborder City, Transmediale Art” Scheiblera Factory, Łódź
- 2012 – The Winners Exhibition: XXIX W. Strzeminskiego Competition. Gallery Kobro Łódź, catalogue: ISBN 978-83-63141-09-7
- 2012 – Paintings Exhibition: VII Charity Auction: "Seed Art – Garden of Hope". Under the auspices of the National Museum in Warsaw, Warsaw University Library. Warsaw.
- 2012 – Participation in the project: "Embroider Łódź", Ksiezy Mlyn, Gallery Manhattan, Łódź
- 2012 – Exhibition "Łódź, the Transborder City", Park-Gardener's Cottage, Zrodliska in Łódź
- 2012 – Painting Exhibition:"Corpus", Gallery -Free Space, ASP Łódź
- 2011 – Painting Exhibition:"Risk" – Gallery: Short and Up to the Point. Łódź
- 2007 – Participation in the post-competition Exhibition, PKiN Warsaw
- 2007 – Participation in the Photo post-competition Exhibition: “Mokotow” Warsaw
- 2007 – Photo Exhibition:"Janow Podlaski”, Town Hall, Deblin
- 2006 – Participation in the Landscape Photographic Exhibition:"Janow Podlaski”, Ermitaz, Lazienki Krolewskie, Warsaw, Zielona Gora, Deblin.
- 2005 – Photo Exhibition:"Remember the Summer", Warsaw – Bemowo
- 1991 – The Association of Artists, Painters and Sculptors Painting Exhibition, Warsaw – Old Town,” Landscape otherwise” – Club „Kadr” Warsaw
- 1979 – The Winners post-competition Painting Exhibition:"Shankar'a”, New Delhi – India

== Publications ==
- 2013 – Participation in the International “The Booooooom and Adobe Remake Photo Project”. Photo interpretation of Leonardo da Vinci “The Last Supper” Vancouver, Canada
- 2013 – The catalogue “Me, Here and Now” from International symposium ASP Łódź, ISBN 978-83-63141-17-2
- 2010 – The article "Examples of copyright infringement by daily newspaper Zycie Warszawy" published in “Ethics in the media vol.7: World standards vice everyday life" by Scriptorium, 2010. ISBN 978-83-62625-02-4
- 2009 – The article "A Puff of Absurdity , TVN Warsaw, 2011, Retrieved 10 June 2013
- 2002 – “Peas around wild animals”, ISBN 83-7341-708-7
- 2002 – "Peas and forest animals”, ISBN 83-7341-706-0
- 2001 – Eleni CD "Something from Odysseus" Group members polymer clay figurines made by Agata Materowicz, Hellnic-Records / Pomaton EMI
- 2001 – “Peas and country animals”, ISBN 83-7212-757-3
- 2000 – "Peas discovers wild animals”, ISBN 83-7341-707-9
- 2000 – "Peas – kindergarten children's first book”, ISBN 978-8373417779
- 1991 – Illustrations made for prof. Anna Sieradzka book: "Cloak, train dress, peaked for-pointed cap: art and fashion in Polish Modernism", Ossolineum, 1991, ISBN 8304024535, ISBN 9788304024533

=== Art catalogues ===
- A. Materowicz – coauthor “Strzeminski 2012 – Creative Arts and Design”, 2012, ISBN 978-83-63141-09-7
- Agata Materowicz “Me, Here and Now”, 2013, ISBN 978-83-63141-17-2

=== Art galleries displaying her art ===
- Kobro Gallery of Art, Łódź
- Gallery: Free Space, Łódź

== See also ==
- List of Polish artists
- Anna Jantar
