= Anna Jantar =

Polish singer (1950–1980)

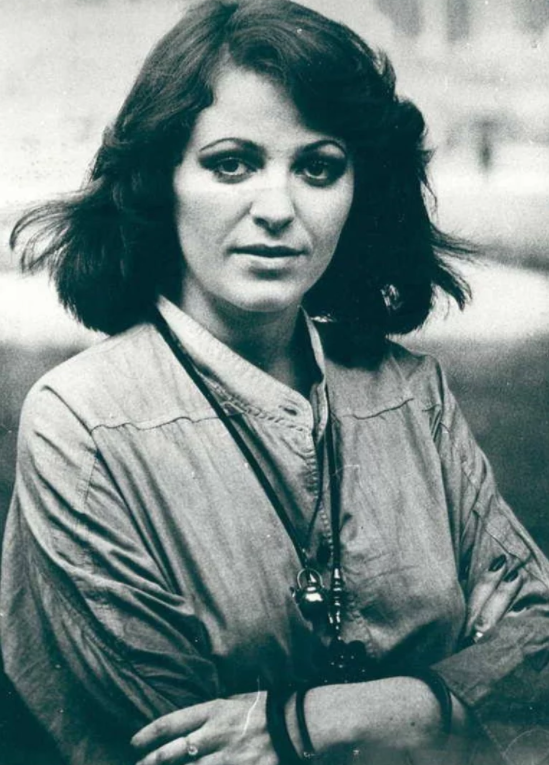
- Portrait of Jantar

Background information
- Also known as: Anna Szmeterling; Anna Kukulska
- Born: Anna Maria Szmeterling; 10 June 1950; Poznań, Poland
- Died: 14 March 1980 (aged 29) Warsaw, Poland
- Genres: Pop
- Occupation: Singer
- Instrument: Piano
- Years active: 1968–1980
- Label: Polskie Nagrania Muza
- Website: annajantar.pl

Anna Jantar (Anna Maria Kukulska, born Anna Maria Szmeterling; 10 June 1950 – 14 March 1980) was a Polish singer and the mother of singer Natalia Kukulska.

== Early and personal life ==
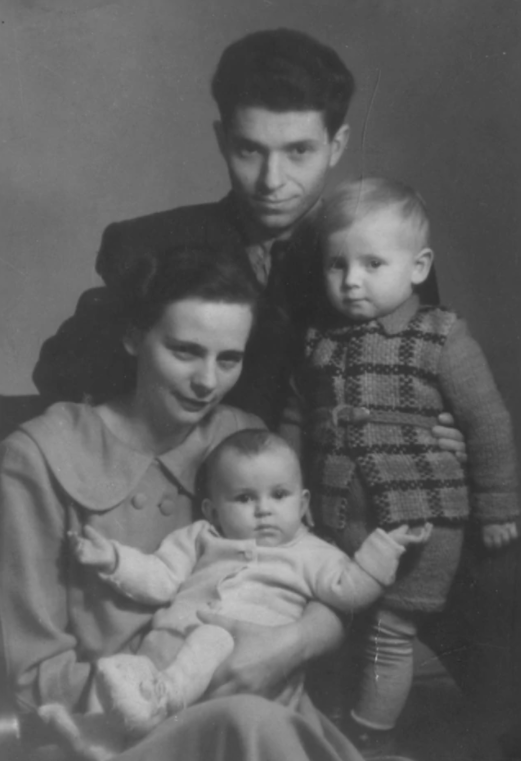
Anna Jantar with her parents and brother Roman (1950s)

Jantar was born in Poznań on 10 June 1950, one of two children born to Hungarian Józef Szmeterling (1925–1997) and Halina, née Surmacewicz (1924–2016). On 1 July 1950, she was baptized at the Church of Holy Saviour in Poznań, receiving the names Anna Maria.

From an early age, showed a talent for singing. For almost three years, she attended a music kindergarten at the State Higher School of Music, where she studied piano. At the age of fourteen, she was invited by Piotr Kuźniak to join the big-beat music group Szafir. She attended Adam Mickiewicz High School in Poznań, from 1965 to 1969 and Secondary Music School in Poznań.

In 1969, she passed the exam at the State Theatre school in Warsaw, but was not accepted due to priority given to students from working-class and rural families.

Jantar married Polish composer Jarosław Kukulski (26 May 1944 – 13 September 2010) on 11 April 1971; the couple had one child, a daughter, singer Natalia Kukulska. A widower after Jantar's 1980 death, he remarried after her death to singer Monika Borys, by whom he had a second child, Piotr.

== Career ==
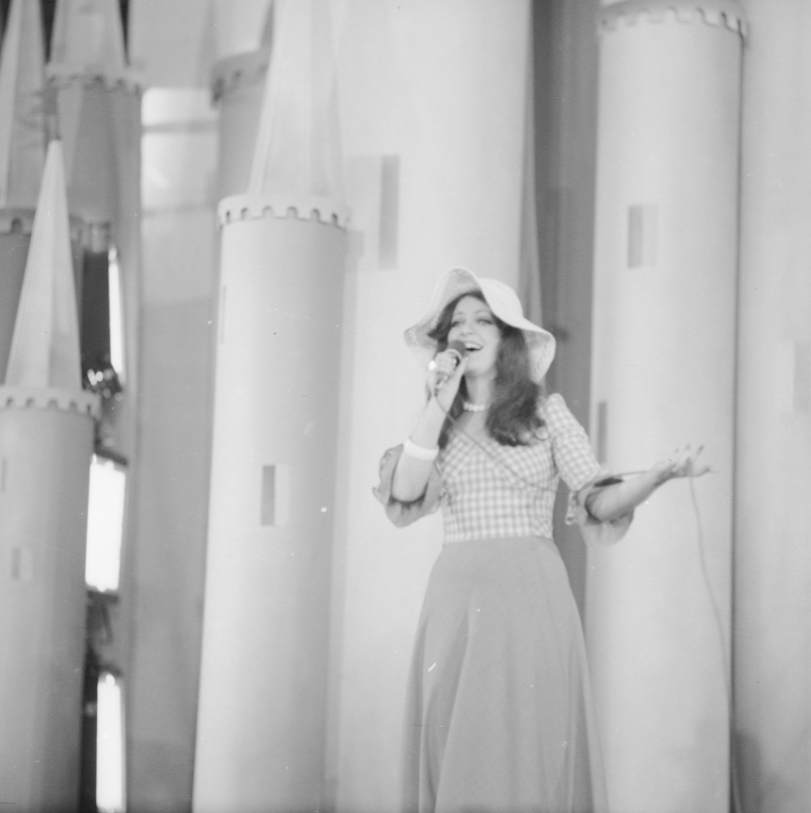
Photograph of Jantar performing at the XII National Festival of Polish Song in Opole by Grażyna Rutowska, 1974

Jantar began her artistic career in 1968 as Anna Szmeterling. Initially, she performed in Poznań student clubs and the Student Theater Nurt in Winogrady, as an accompanist and later also as a vocalist. On 16 December 1968, she collaborated with the band Polne Kwiaty and recorded the song Po ten kwiat czerwony on the Poznań radio. In January 1969, she performed at the Student Song Festival in Kraków, which is prestigious artistic environment, where she received a distinction for her performance. A year later she became the lead vocalist of the band Waganci. Her best-known song from this period is Co ja w tobie widziałam ("What did I see in you"). Jarosław Kukulski, whom she married on 11 April 1971, was also a member of the group and composed many of her hit songs. The group cooperated with the Czerwono-Czarni band during a joint concert tour. She appeared in the musical comedy Milion za Laurę ("Million for Laura"), which was directed by Hieronim Przybył, while performing the song Czujna straż ("Vigilant Guard") with the band Wagantami. In 1972, she passed the examination before the Verification Commission of the Ministry of Culture and Arts, obtaining the title of a professional singer and assumed the artistic pseudonym: 'Anna Jantar', thus beginning her solo career. She performed in a stage program together with singer Andrzej Frajndt with a script provided by Janusz Weiss.

In 1973, she took part in the National Festival of Polish Song in Opole with the song Najtrudniejszy pierwszy krok ("The first step is the hardest"). Later, she launched many other hits, including Staruszek świat ("Old Man World"), Za każdy uśmiech ("For Every Smile"), Tyle słońca w całym mieście ('So Much Sun in the Whole City'), Moje jedyne marzenie ('My Only Dream') and many more, which made her one of the most popular Polish singers of the 1970s. Jantar collaborated with many Polish artists, including with Stanisław Sojka, Bogusław Mec, Zbigniew Hołdys and Andrzej Tenard. She also recorded songs with Budka Suflera and the band Perfect. She performed at concerts in countries such as Austria, Bulgaria, Canada, Czechoslovakia, Finland, East Germany, West Germany, Hungary, Ireland, Soviet Union, Sweden, the United States and Yugoslavia.

In 1979, Jantar was awarded the honorary badge Meritorious Activist of Culture. The last TV program she participated was a children's program titled Zamiast słuchać bajek ("Instead of Listening to Fairy Tales"), which was filmed in Wałbrzych.

== Death ==
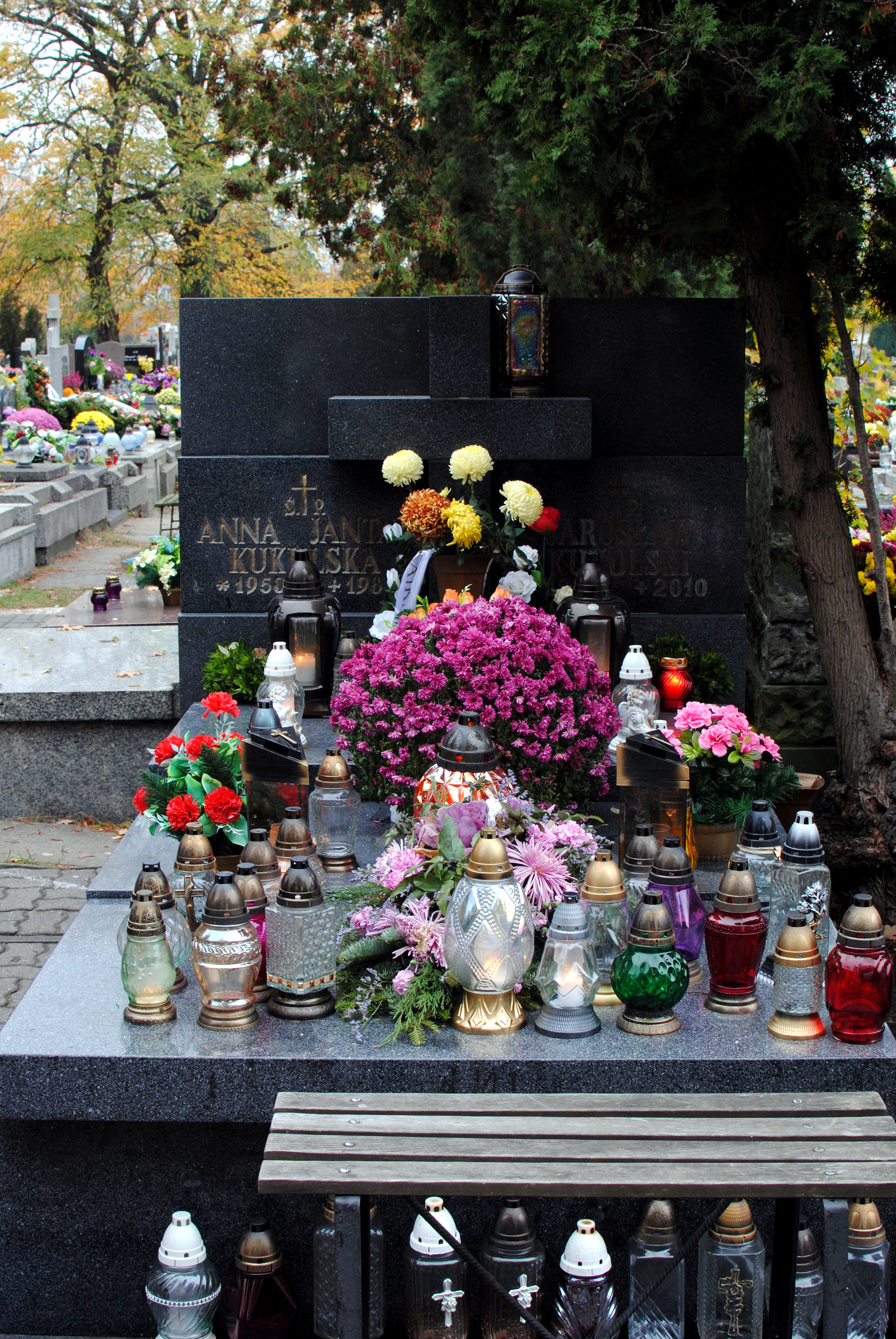
Grave of Anna Jantar and Jarosław Kukulski at the Wawrzyszewski Cemetery

On 27 December 1979, Jantar flew to the United States. In January and February 1980, she played concerts at the Polish American community clubs in Chicago and New Jersey. On 12 March, she performed her last concert at the Zodiac club in New Jersey. During one of her last performances, she said to the audience:

Good evening, welcome to you very cordially. I greet all the children who have come today (...). Ladies and Gentlemen, hello and, unfortunately, I am sorry to say goodbye. Because I am singing today for the last time (...) for you and I am very happy and at the same time a bit sad about it. I will sing a few songs from my repertoire for you. They will be older, newer ... Of course, there will be some complete novelties. And I'll start with a song that I have a special fondness for, as it reminds me of the beginnings of my stage work. A song with a beautiful title, which can also be a recipe for happiness - Żeby szczęśliwym być ("To be happy").

On 14 March 1980, Jantar was returning to Warsaw from New York by LOT Polish Airlines Flight 007, when the plane crashed near Okęcie Airport in Warsaw due to uncontained engine failure. Jantar along with the other 86 passengers and crew died in the crash. After her death, the forensic doctor who conducted her autopsy handed over to her mother Halina a rosary, which she was holding in her clenched hand during the crash.

On 25 March, her funeral ceremony took place, with the participation of approximately 40,000 people at Wawrzyszewski Cemetery in Warsaw. Actor Daniel Olbrychski eulogized her at the funeral. When her husband Jarosław Kukulski died on 10 September 2010, he was buried next to her at the Wawrzyszewski Cemetery.

== Photo gallery ==
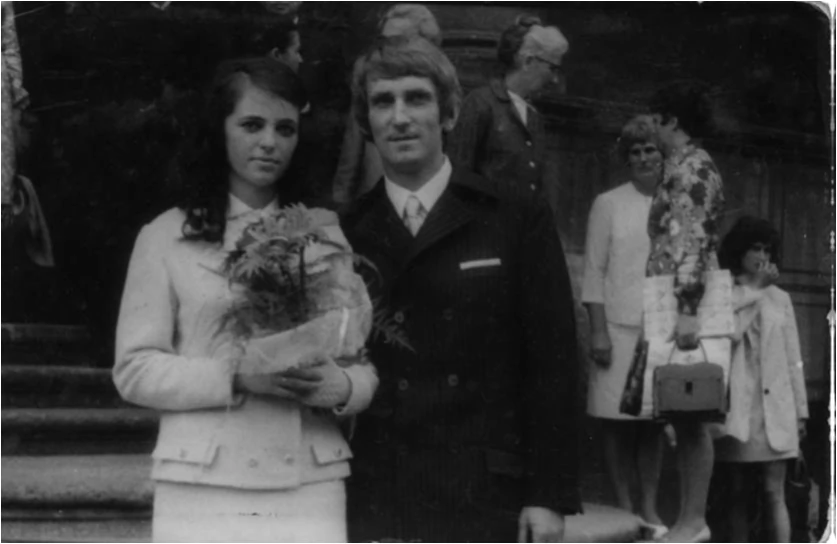
Anna Jantar and Jarosław Kukulski at their wedding (1974)

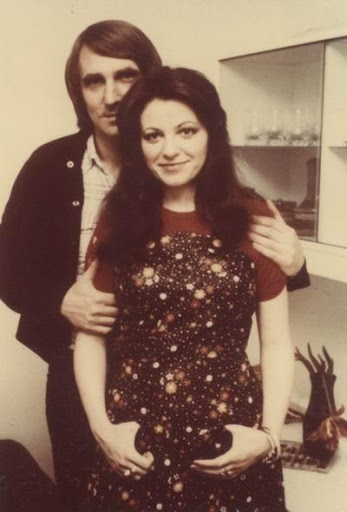
Anna Jantar and Jarosław Kukulski

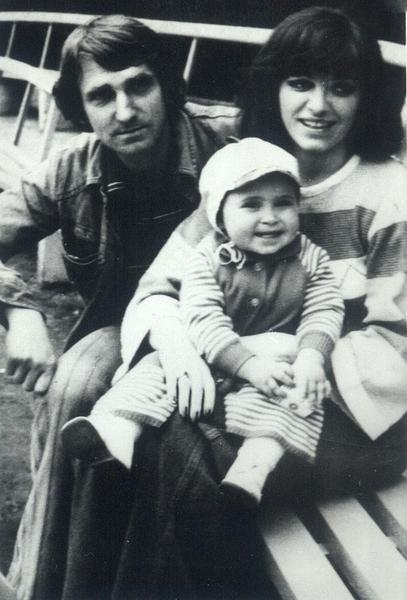
Anna Jantar and Jarosław Kukulski with their daughter Natalia

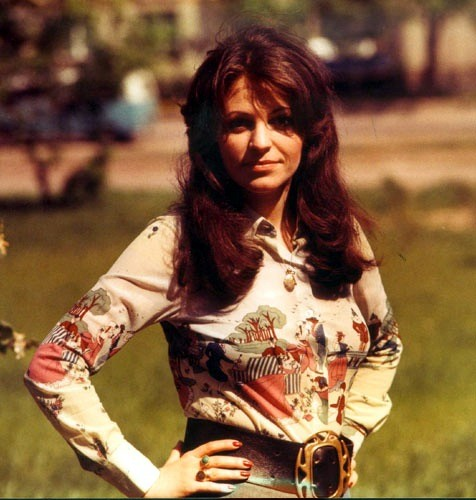
Anna Jantar

== Awards ==
- 1970 – "Song of the year (1970)" for Co ja w tobie widziałam
- 1974 – National Festival of Polish Song in Opole – People's Choice Award for the song "Tyle słońca w całym mieście"
- 1974 – Coupe d'Europe – 3rd place with Marianna Wróblewska and Tadeusz Woźniak for the song Tyle słońca w całym mieście
- 1975 – Sopot Festival – 2nd place for her performance of the song "Staruszek świat", people's choice award
- 1975 – 2nd place for the song Niech ziemia tonie w kwiatach at the Festival of Hit Songs in Dresden
- 1975 – Polish "Song of the year (1975)" for Tyle słońca w całym mieście
- 1975 – Polish "Singer of the year (1975)"
- 1976 – Złota Płyta for her album Tyle słońca w całym mieście at the Sopot Festival
- 1977 – Złota Płyta for the album "Za każdy uśmiech"
- 1979 – 2nd place for her performance of her song Tylko mnie poproś do tańca ("Just ask me to dance") at the Festival of Hit Songs in Tampere, Finland
- 1979 – Polish "Song of the year (1979)" for the song Nic nie może wiecznie trwać ("Nothing lasts forever"), chosen by listeners of the radio station Studia Gama
- 1979 – Polish "Singer of the year (1979)"

== Discography ==
=== Singles ===
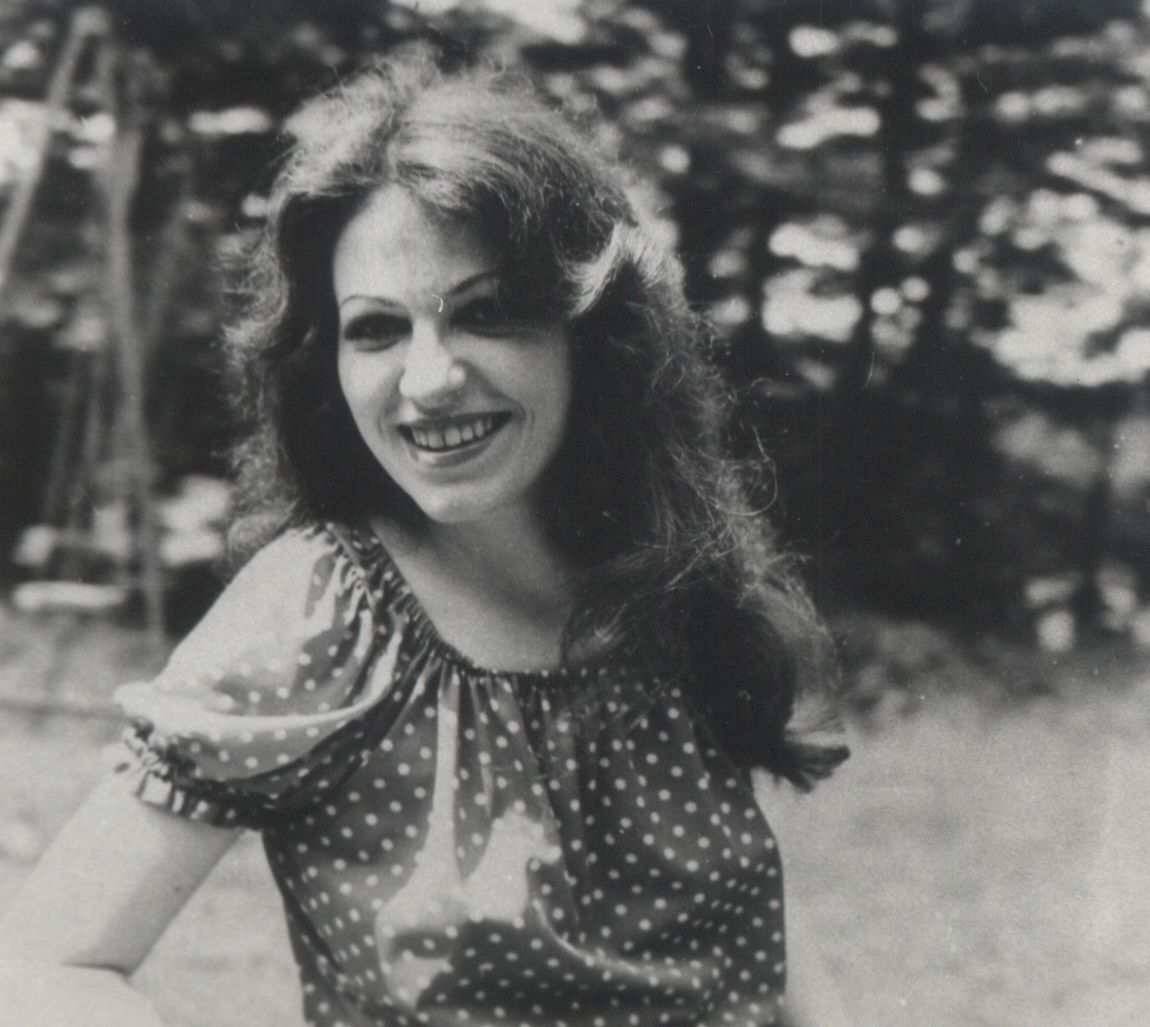
Anna Jantar

- 1971 – Wszystkie koty w nocy czarne/Marzenia o marzeniaci (Waganci)
- 1974 – Nastanie dzień/Tyle słońca w całym mieście nie widziałem tego
- 1975 – Staruszek świat/Dzień bez happy endu
- 1975 – Będzie dość/Za każdy uśmiech
- 1975 – Mój tylko mój/Dzień nadziei
- 1977 – Dyskotekowy bal/Zgubiłam klucz do nieba
- 1977 – Dyskotekowy bal/Kto umie tęsknić
- 1978 – Baju-baj proszę pana (Jambalaya)/Radość najpiękniejszych lat
- 1978 – Po tamtej stronie marzeń/Mój świat zawsze ten sam
- 1978 – Mój tylko mój/Mój świat zawsze ten sam
- 1978 – Kto powie nam/Dżinsowe maniery
- 1978 – Tylko mnie poproś do tańca/Let me stay/Nie wierz mi nie ufaj mi/Zawsze gdzieś czeka ktoś
- 1979 – Gdzie są dzisiaj tamci ludzie/Nie ma piwa w niebie
- 1979 – Hopelessly devoted to you/You're the one that I want (with Stanisław Sojka)
- 1985 – Wielka dama tańczy sama/Moje jedyne marzenie
- 2005 – Układ z życiem/Nic nie może wiecznie trwać

=== Albums ===
- 1974 – "Tyle słońca w całym mieście", reedition 2001
- 1975 – "Za każdy uśmiech", reedition 2001
- 1979 – "Zawsze gdzieś czeka ktoś"
- 1980 – "Anna Jantar", reedition 1999

=== Compilations ===
- 1980 – "The Best Of"
- 1986 – "Anna i Natalia" (Anna Jantar, Natalia Kukulska)
- 1990 – "Piosenki Anny Jantar" (Anna Jantar i inni artyści)
- 1990 – "The Best Of 2"
- 1991 – "Piosenki dla dzieci" (Anna Jantar, Natalia Kukulska)
- 1991 – "Nic nie może wiecznie trwać"
- 1991 – "Wspomnienie"
- 1992 – "The collection"
- 1992 – "Złote przeboje"
- 1996 – "Cygańska jesień"
- 1997 – "Antalogia cz.1"
- 1997 – "Antalogia cz.2"
- 1999 – "Przyjaciele"
- 2000 – "Radość najpiękniejszych lat" (Złota kolekcja)
- 2000 – "Tyle słońca..." live (Koncert poświęcony pamięci Anny Jantar)
- 2003 – "Perły – Tyle słońca w całym mieście"
- 2004 – "Platynowa kolekcja – Złote przeboje"
- 2004 – "The best – Dyskotekowy bal"
- 2005 – "Tyle słońca..." 3 CD
- 2005 – "Po tamtej stronie" (Anna Jantar, Natalia Kukulska)
- 2010 – "Wielka dama" 4 CD

== Memorials ==
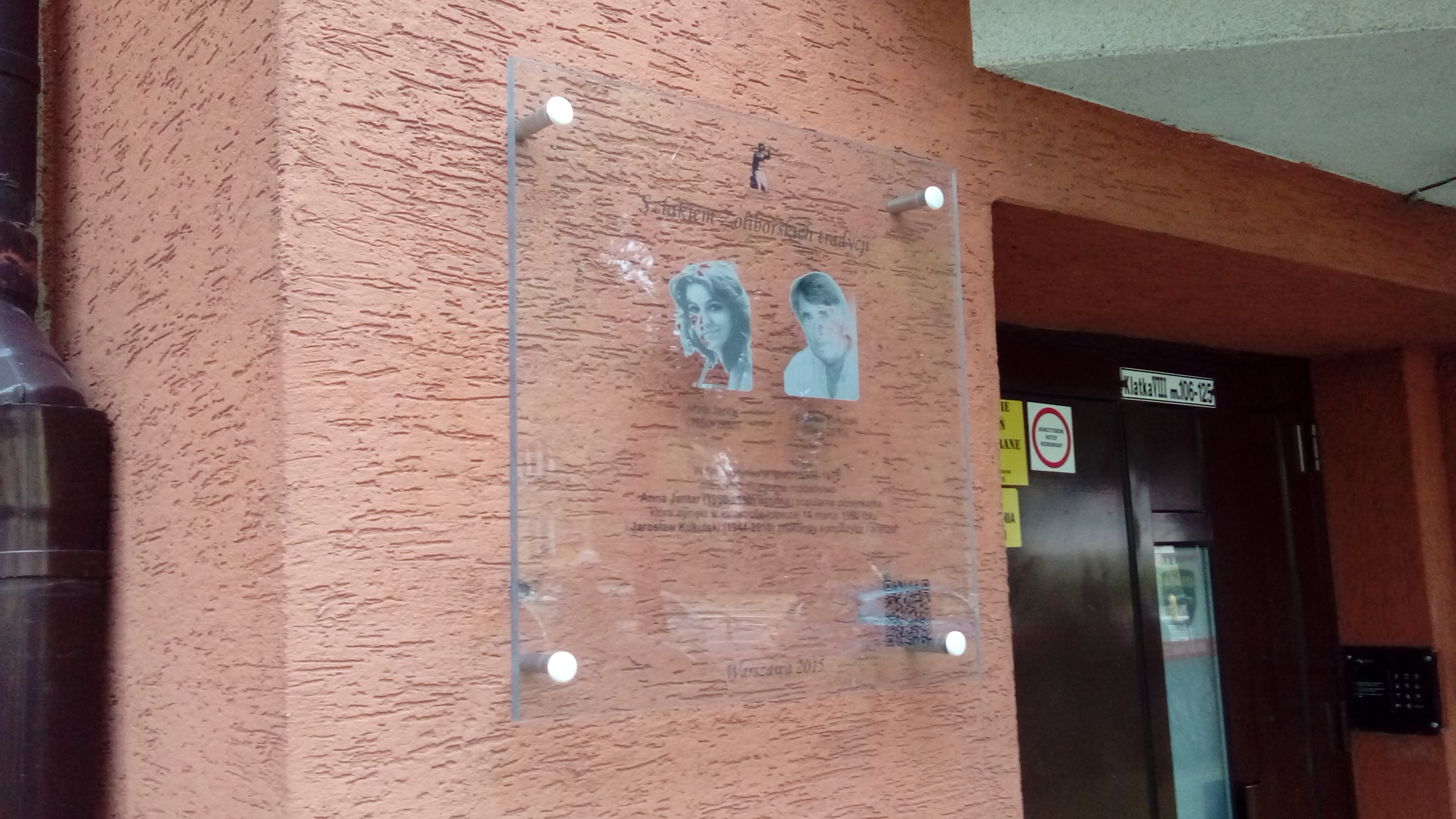
Plaque commemorating Anna Jantar and Jarosław Kukulski at their former apartment in the Żoliborz district of Warsaw.

- After the death of Jantar, Polish group Budka Suflera dedicated their song "Słońca jakby mniej" for Jantar.
- Krzysztof Krawczyk dedicated his song "To co dał nam świat" to Jantar.
- Anna Jantar "Bursztyn" Music Club was founded by Agata Materowicz and Zbigniew Rostkowski. Shortly that Club had more than 600 members in Poland.
- In 1984, Agata Materowicz, Zbigniew Rostkowski, and Roman Woszczek organized the exhibition Anna Jantar- First Step- Last Step" at the Students Club „Stodola" – Warsaw. Jarosław Kukulski and Natalia opened the exhibition, and songs were performed by Eleni Tzoka and Halina Frackowiak. The collection included photos, her personal mementos, letters from her Fans, dresses and costumes, awards, long play records etc. From Warsaw, the exhibition moved to Poznań, Łódź and Lublin.
- In Wrzesnia, the local amphitheater is named after Anna Jantar.
- The mural dedicated to Jantar was unveiled in Opole last September 3, 2020 and was made by her daughter Natalia Kukulska.

== Bibliography ==
- Pryzwan, Mariola (2014). Bursztynowa dziewczyna: Anna Jantar we wspomnieniach. Wyd. 1. Warsaw: Wydawnictwo Marginesy, 2014. ISBN 9788363656454.
- Wilk, Marcin (2015). Tyle słońca. Anna Jantar. Biografia. Wyd. 1. Kraków: Znak. ISBN 9788324033997.
- Filler, Witold (1999). Gwiazdozbiór estrady polskiej: od Zimińskiej do Kayah. Warsaw: Philip Wilson. ISBN 9788372360977.
