= Natalia Kukulska =

Polish singer

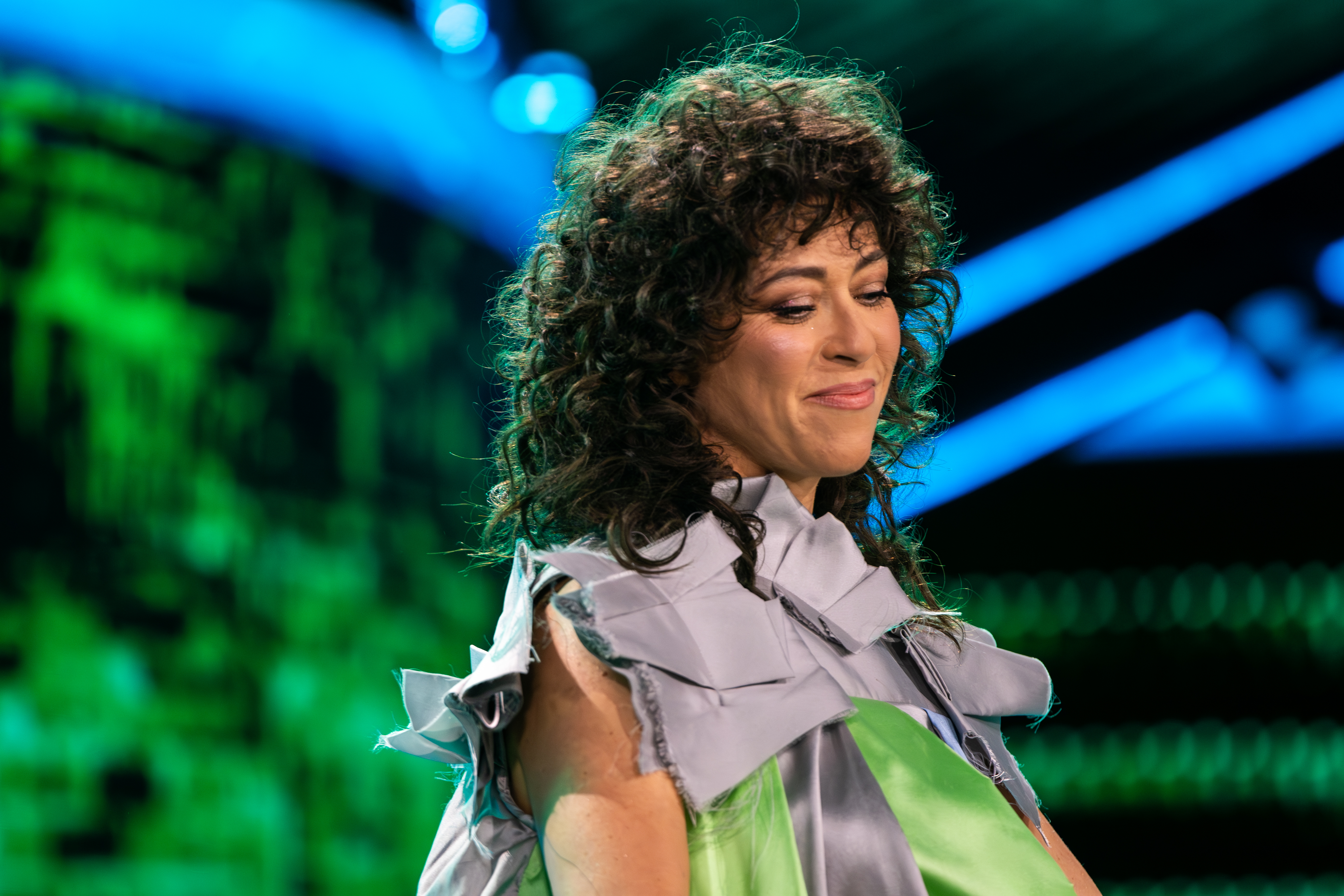
- Natalia Kukulska in 2025
- Born: 3 March 1976 (age 50); Warsaw, Poland
- Occupation: Singer
- Parent(s): Anna Jantar; Jarosław Kukulski
- Musical career
- Genres: Pop, R&B, Electronic
- Years active: 1986–present
- Labels: Universal Music Poland, EMI Music Poland
- Website: nataliakukulska.pl

Natalia Maria Kukulska (born 3 March 1976) is a Polish singer performing pop and R&B music, turning towards alternative electronica in the 2010s. She debuted as a child singer in 1986, and released her first "adult" solo album in 1996. Her most popular songs include "Dłoń", "Piosenka światłoczuła", "Im więcej ciebie tym mniej", "W biegu", and "Wierność jest nudna". She has sold over 1.8 million albums as of 2014 and received three platinum records and six gold records.

== Early life ==
Kukulska was born on 3 March 1976 in Warsaw. She is the daughter of the late singer Anna Jantar, who was extremely popular in the 1970s and died in the 1980 LOT plane crash, and the late composer Jarosław Kukulski, who also wrote songs for Irena Jarocka, Krzysztof Krawczyk, Eleni and many more. She also has a half-brother from her father's second marriage, Piotr Kukulski.

She attended XXI Social High School in Warsaw ("XXI Społecznym Liceum Ogólnokształcącym w Warszawie"), and graduated in 1995.

== Career ==
She began singing professionally in 1984. In 1986 she released her debut studio album, simply titled 'Natalia'. The music publishing studio began promoting her two singles "Puszek Okruszek" and "Co powie tata".

A year later, she released her second album entitled "Bajki Natalki" ('Natalia's Fairy Tales'), for which she received the first platinum record in the history of Polish phonography. In 1991 she recorded her first CD with Christmas carols entitled "Najpiękniejsze kolędy" ('The Most Beautiful Christmas Carols'). She promoted the album with the singles "Dłoń" and "Piosenka światłoczuła", both of which reached the 32nd place in the Polish Radio's Third Program. The popular songs was certified gold for high domestic sales. In 1995, she was nominated for the Fryderyk award of the Polish phonographic industry in the Album of the Year - Pop category. In 1997, she released a studio album entitled Pulse, which she promoted with the singles "Im więcej ciebie tym mniej", "W biegu" and "Czy ona jest", as well as her own interpretation of Barbra Streisand's song "Woman in Love". The album was called Double Platinum, three months after its premiere.

In November 1997, Kukulska released her song "Ani słowa", during the promotion of Walt Disney Studio's animated film Hercules, during its premiere. On 26 January 1998 Kukulska and the Dutch music duo R'n'G recorded the song "We'll Be Together", which in 2001 appears on their album "The Right Time", which was released all over Europe. In September 1998, she recorded Polish version songs for the movie Quest for Camelot; "On My Father's Wings" ('Niech Duch Ojca niesie mnie') and duet with Andrzej Piaseczny "If I Didn't Have You" ('Jesteś blisko mnie'). She was chosen by producer and composer of the movie, David Foster.

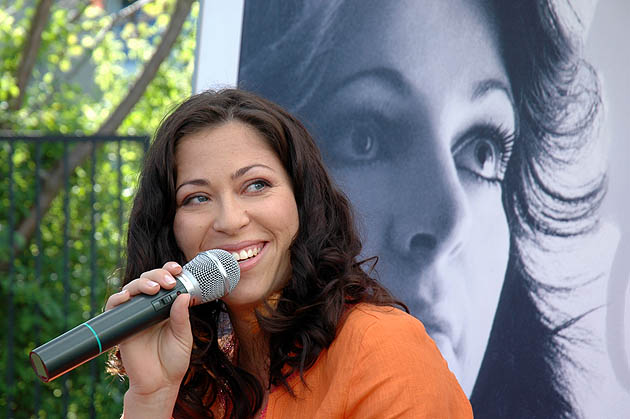
Natalia at a concert honoring her mother (2005)

On 1 March 1999 she released an album entitled "Autoportret" ('Self-portrait'), in which she promoted with the singles "Przychodzimy tylko raz", "Skończyło się" and "Zanim wszystko się odwróci". Also in her album included a new version of the hit song "Tyle słońca w całym mieście" from the repertoire of her mother Anna Jantar and a cover of the hit "Heartbreaker" by Dionne Warwick.

On 4 June 1999 Kukulska took part in the 36th National Festival of Polish Song in Opole, where, apart from her recital, she also conducted a debut concert with Mietek Szcześniak. On 13 March 2000 the album "Tyle Słoń" was released as a recording of the concert dedicated to the memory of Anna Jantar. The event took place on 23 February at the Jewish Theatre in Warsaw, and leading Polish artists performed on stage alongside Natalia.

On 23 April 2001 she presented the album entitled "Tobie", for which she was nominated for Fryderyk in the Album of the Year - Pop category. The publishing studio promoted her singles "Niepotrzebny", "Cicho ciepło" and "Jeśli ona". A bonus track of the album was the song "Z głębi serc", which was dedicated to Pope John Paul II. The album was ranked 1st OLiS with the Gold Record status, and the accompanying promotion, she takes part in 10 outdoor concerts with over 600 thousand people.

In April 2004, Kukulska made her debut at the Roma Musical Theater in Warsaw, where she played the role of Kim, the main character of the musical Miss Saigon, which was directed by Wojciech Kępczyński. On 12 May 2005 the two-disc compilation "Po tamtej stron" was released. The first CD contains 20 songs performed by Anna Jantar, while the second one Natalia performs four songs of her mother and the song "Po tamtej stron" was specially composed for this occasion.

In November 2007, she released another studio album entitled "Sexi Flexi", which was produced by the Plan B duo - Bartek Królik and Marek Piotrowski . The album received 5 nominations for the Fryderyk award and achieved the status of a Gold Record. It was promoted by singles: "Sexi Flexi", "Pół na pół" and "Fantasies".

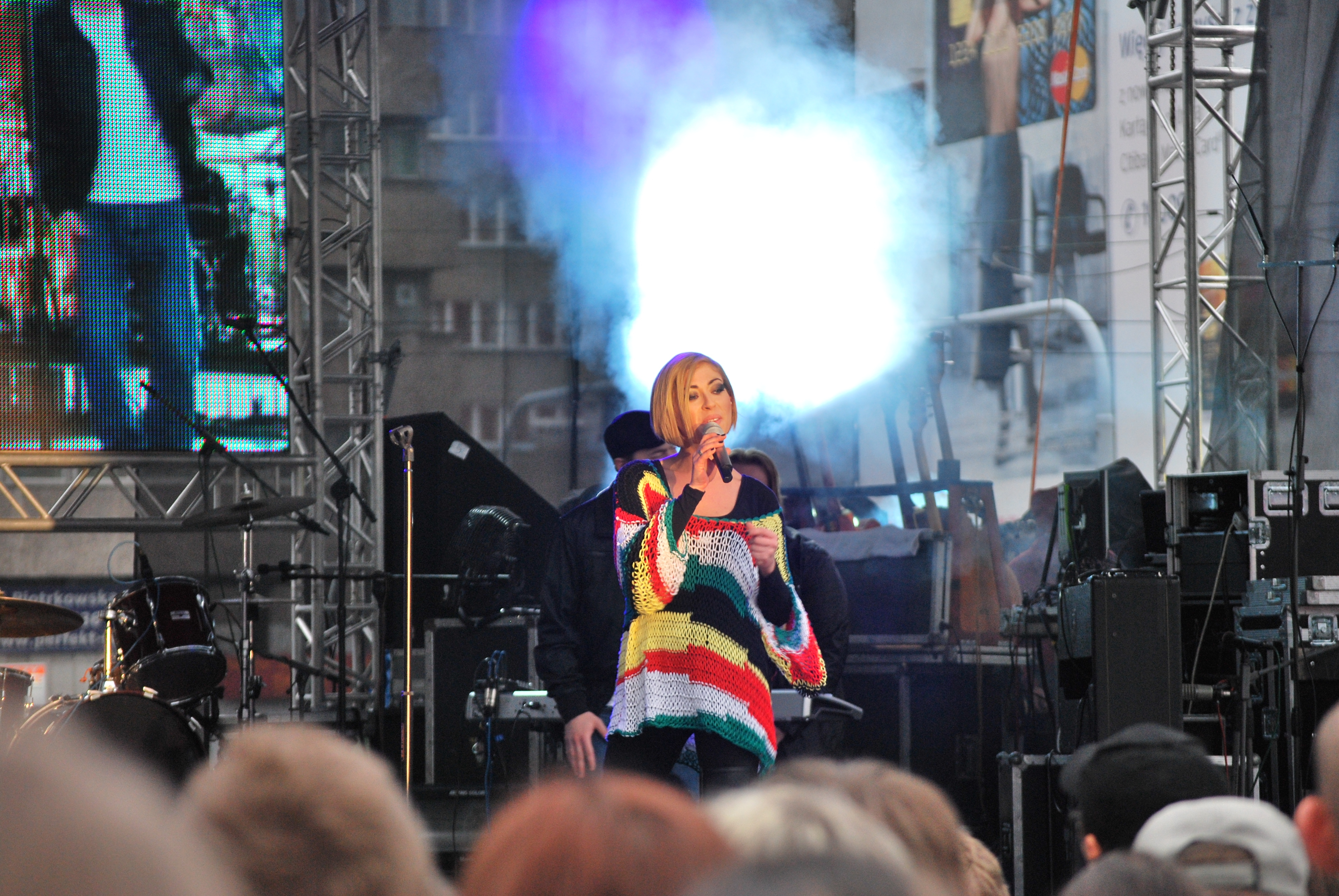
Natalia at a concert in Łódź (2011)

In October 2008, she was interviewed as part of CNN's program - "Eye on Poland". On 24 February 2010, accompanied by the Classic Jazz Quartet, she took part in the concert "Our Contemporary Chopin" as part of the "Chopin Year". During the concert, he performed Chopin's songs arranged by Adam Sztaba. In April, she made her debut as a columnist for the Fashion Magazine devoted to fashion. On 18 May, together with her husband Michał Dąbrówka, she released the album "CoMix", signed as the duo Kukulska & Dąbrówka. The recording session was attended by the Polish Radio Symphony Orchestra conducted by Adam Sztaba. In February 2012, she became a trainer in the TVP2 program "Bitwa na głosy" .

In 2016 she was a trainer in the seventh edition of TVP2's The Voice of Poland. On 25 May 2018 she released the album entitled Search in Dreams, containing lullabies with lyrics of songs by late Soviet musician Vladimir Vysotsky. It was recorded with jazz guitarist Marek Napiórkowski. The album was awarded a Fryderyk in the category "album of the year (music for children and youth)".

In 2021, in the TV show entitled "Zakochany Mickiewicz", which was directed by Marcin Kołaczkowski, she sang Adam Mickiewicz's "Invocation".

She performed a live concert with Polish national philharmonic orchestra during Expo 2025 in Osaka, Japan on August 29, 2025.

== Personal life ==
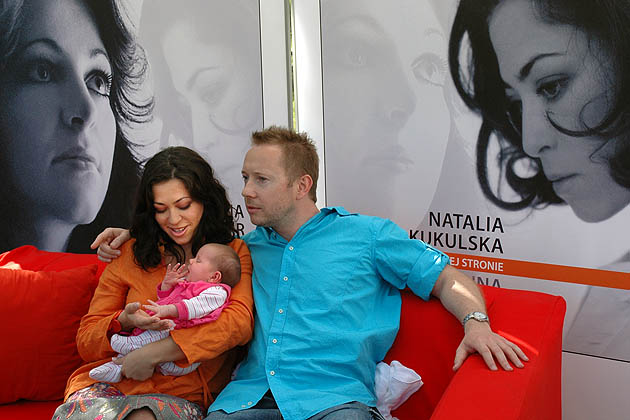
Natalia with her husband Michał Dąbrówka and daughter Anna (2005)

She married musician Michał Dąbrówka in February 2000. They were dating since 1990. Kukulska and Dąbrówka live in Komorów near Warsaw. Their first child, Jan Dąbrówka, was born on 24 June 2000. He was named after Michał Dąbrówka's grandfather. On 4 May 2005 she gave birth to her second child and first daughter, Anna Dąbrówka. The girl was named after Natalia's mother.

Kukulska's maternal grandmother, Halina Szmeterling, took care of her after her mother's tragic death. Mrs. Szmeterling lived with her granddaughter and great-grandchildren in Komorów, until she died in September 2016 at the age of 92.

On 30 July 2016 she announced that she was expecting their third child. On 5 January 2017 in Warsaw she gave birth to a daughter, Laura Dąbrówka.

=== Charitable activities ===
Kukulska is known for her charitable activities. She has performed at the finals of the Great Orchestra of Christmas Charity many times. In 1997, together with a group of Polish artists, she recorded the song "Moja i Twoja nadzieja" ('My and Your Hope'). The income from its sale was allocated to the flood victims.

In 2002, she took part in the initiative "Cała Polska czyta Dzieciom", in which she read a fairy tale to her son, and recorded a song and a video clip "Wspomnienia są blisko" ('Memories are near'). In August 2005, together with other artists, she recorded the anthem of the TVN foundation "Nie jesteś sam" ('You are not alone'). On 20 November 2006 she started the initiative "Konwój Muszkieterów", for which she recorded a special CD with live versions of her hits and the Foundation's anthem "Możemy nieść pomoc" ('We can help'). Within this initiative, Kukulska visited three orphanages, giving gifts to their residents. The income from the sale of the album was allocated to the purchase of Christmas gifts for children from orphanages.

On 12 April 2007 she became the UNICEF Goodwill Ambassador and promoted the School for Africa campaign to establish schools in Angola. Since 2012, she has been an active ambassador of the SOS Children's Villages Association.

== Discography ==
=== Studio albums ===
Title	Album details	Peak chart positions	Certifications
Title	Album details	POL	Certifications
Natalia	Released: 1986; Label: Polskie Nagrania Muza; Formats: LP, CD	—	
Bajki Natalki	Released: 1987; Label: Polskie Nagrania Muza; Formats: LP, CD	—	
Światło	Released: 26 October 1996; Label: Izabelin Studio; Formats: CD, cassette, digital download	—	POL: Gold
Puls	Released: 19 October 1997; Label: PolyGram Poland; Formats: CD, cassette, digital download	—	POL: Platinum
Autoportret	Released: 26 February 1999; Label: PolyGram Poland; Formats: CD, cassette, digital download	—	POL: Gold
Tobie	Released: 23 April 2001; Label: Universal Music Poland; Formats: CD, cassette, digital download	1	
Natalia Kukulska	Released: 20 October 2003; Label: Universal Music Poland; Formats: CD, cassette, digital download	5	
Sexi Flexi	Released: 12 November 2007; Label: EMI Music Poland; Formats: CD, digital download	20	POL: Gold
CoMix (with Michał Dąbrówka)	Released: 17 May 2010; Label: EMI Music Poland; Formats: CD, digital download	34	
Ósmy plan	Released: 23 February 2015; Label: Alternat; Formats: CD, digital download	32	
Halo tu Ziemia	Released: 29 September 2017; Label: Agora; Formats: CD, digital download	20	
"—" denotes a recording that did not chart or was released before OLiS was launched.

=== Christmas albums ===
Title	Album details
Najpiękniejsze kolędy	Released: 1991; Label: Poker Sound; Formats: CD
Kolędy na żywo	Released: 6 December 2000; Label: Universal Music Polska; Formats: CD
Kolędy	Released: December 2012; Label: Formats: CD

=== Collaborative albums ===
Title	Album details	Peak chart positions
Title	Album details	POL
Anna & Natalia (with Anna Jantar)	Released: 1985; Label: Savitor; Formats: LP	—
Po tamtej stronie (with Anna Jantar)	Released: 23 May 2005; Label: Sony BMG Poland; Formats: CD	4
"—" denotes a recording that did not chart or was released before OLiS was launched.

=== Singles ===
Title	Year	Album
"Dłoń"	1996	Światło
"Piosenka światłoczuła"	1996	Światło
"Daleki brzeg"	1997	Światło
"Im więcej ciebie tym mniej"	1997	Puls
"W biegu"	1997	Puls
"Ani słowa"	1997	Herkules (soundtrack)
"Czy ona jest"	1998	Puls
"We'll Be Together" (with R'n'G)	1998	—N/a
"Jakbyś chciał mi coś powiedzieć"	1998	Puls
"Przychodzimy tylko raz"	1999	Autoportret
"Tyle słońca w całym mieście" (with Anna Jantar)	1999	Autoportret
"Skończyło się"	1999	Autoportret
"Zanim wszystko się odwróci"	1999	Autoportret
"Ale we mnie wszystko twoje"	1999	www.megaTOP_1999.pl (various artists)
"Zakochani"	2000	Zakochani (soundtrack)
"Z głębi serc"	2000	Tobie
"Niepotrzebny"	2001	Tobie
"Cicho ciepło"	2001	Tobie
"Jeśli ona"	2001	Tobie
"Wspomnienia są blisko"	2002	—N/a
"Nikt nie będzie żył za ciebie"	2002	Słońce lato muzyka (various artists)
"Kamienie" (with Tede)	2003	Natalia Kukulska
"Decymy"	2003	Natalia Kukulska
"I Wanna Know"	2004	Natalia Kukulska
"Po tamtej stronie"	2005	Po tamtej stronie
"Słońce za mną chodzi"	2005	Po tamtej stronie
"Sexi Flexi"	2007	Sexi Flexi
"Pół na pół" (with Bartek Królik)	2008	Sexi Flexi
"Fantasies"	2008	Sexi Flexi
"To jest komiks"	2010	CoMix
"Wierność jest nudna"	2010	Och Karol 2 (soundtrack)
"Wierzę w nas"	2011	CoMix
"Pióropusz"	2014	Ósmy plan
"Na koniec świata"	2014	Ósmy plan
"Miau"	2015	Ósmy plan
"My"	2015	Ósmy plan
"Nasz czas"	2016	Elena z Avaloru (soundtrack)
"Kobieta"	2017	Halo tu Ziemia
"Halo tu Ziemia"	2017	Halo tu Ziemia
"Ostatnia prosta"	2018	Halo tu Ziemia
"Rekonstrukcja"	2018	Halo tu Ziemia
