= Jarosław Kukulski =

Polish composer (1944–2010)

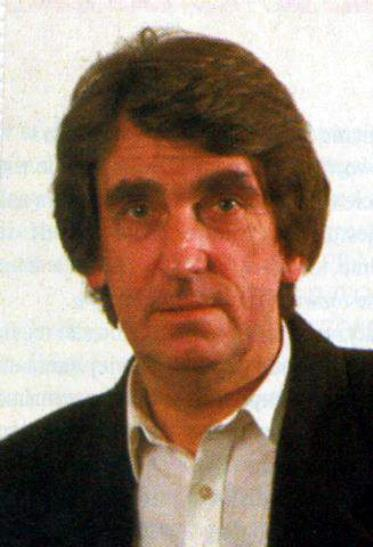

Background information
- Also known as: Robert Kirlej
- Born: Jarosław Kazimierz Kukulski; 25 May 1944; Września, Reichsgau Wartheland, Germany
- Died: 13 September 2010 (aged 66) Warsaw, Masovia, Poland
- Genres: Pop
- Occupation: Composer
- Years active: 1968–2010
- Website: jaroslawkukulski.com

Jarosław Kazimierz Kukulski (25 May 1944 – 13 September 2010) was a Polish composer. He was the husband of late singer Anna Jantar and the father of singer Natalia Kukulska.

== Early life ==
Kukulski was born on May 25, 1944, in Września to Maria and Kazimierz Kukulski. In 1967, Kukulski graduated from Poznań Secondary Music School and the Instrumental Department of the State Higher School of Music in Poznań, where he learned to play the oboe.

At the same time he completed an internship in Poznań Opera and the philharmonic in Zielona Góra. He collaborated with a cabaret ”Nurt” in Poznań.

== Career ==
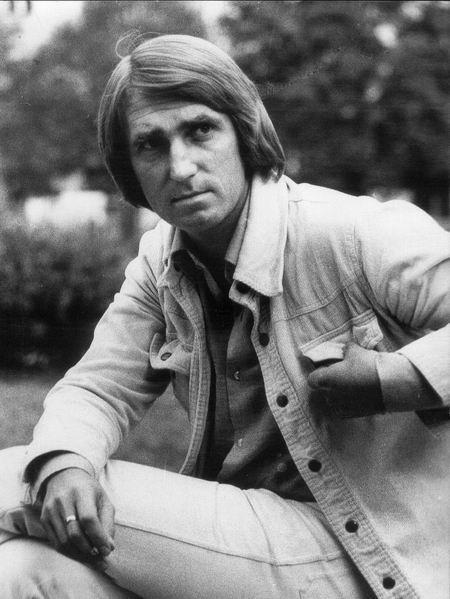
Jarosław Kukulski (1970s)

For a time, he played jazz in dixieland bands. In 1968, at the II Military Song Festival in Kołobrzeg, he received an award from the Ministry of National Defense for the song Zaślubinowy pierścień ('The Wedding Ring'). In 1968, he started a big-beat band named Waganci. In 1969, his future wife Anna Jantar joined the band as a soloist. As a result of frequent personnel changes, Kukulski disbanded the group in 1972 in order to focus on his wife's solo career.

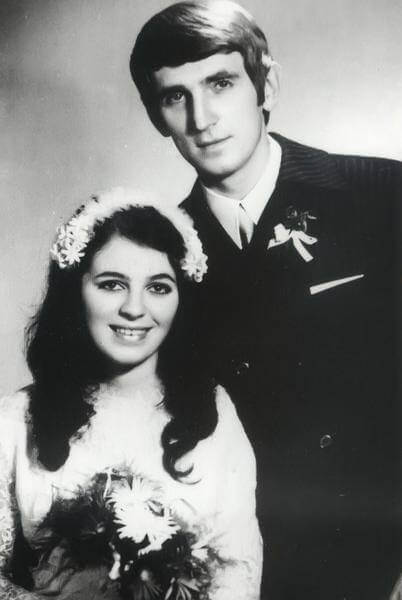
Marriage photo of Kukulski and Anna Jantar (1974)

In the 1970s, he was responsible for most of Anna Jantar's greatest successes and wrote for her notable hits such as, Najtrudniejszy pierwszy krok ('The Most Difficult First Step'), Tyle słońca w całym mieście ('So Much Sun in the Whole City') and Moje jedyne marzenie ('My Only Dream'). After Anna Jantar's death on 1980, he continued to compose songs for his daughter Natalia and many other famous Polish artists such as Irena Jarocka, Eleni Tzoka, Krzysztof Krawczyk, Anna German, Felicjan Andrzejczak, Bogusław Mec and his second wife Monika Borys. He also collaborated other well-known Polish songwriters.

Kukulski served on the jury of the Soviet Song Festival in Zielona Góra. He served as composer from Polish films Nie zaznasz spokoju (1977), Komedianci z wczorajszej ulicy (1986) and Pan Samochodzik i niesamowity dwór (1987). At the end of the 1990s, TVP Polonia broadcast a regular program devoted to the work of outstanding Polish artists, mainly composers and authors of texts entitled "Z archiwum i pamięci" ('From the Archive and Memory'). Three episodes of this program were devoted to Kukulski.

== Personal life ==
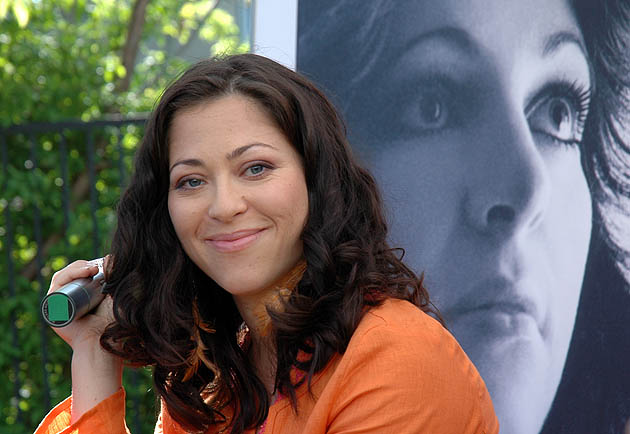
Natalia Kukulska

In 1969, Kukulski met Anna Jantar, during the creation of his band Waganci. On August 15, 1970, they had a civil wedding at the Poznań Town Hall and later a church wedding on April 11, 1971, at the Church of St. Anna in Poznań. The couple had one daughter, Natalia Kukulska (born on March 3, 1976). On March 14, 1980, Anna Jantar died in the crash of LOT Polish Airlines Flight 007 near Okęcie Airport in Warsaw, while returning from the United States after performing in concerts for the Polish American communities.

Kukulski later married singer Monika Borys. In 1989, the couple had a son named Piotr Kukulski.

== Final years and death ==
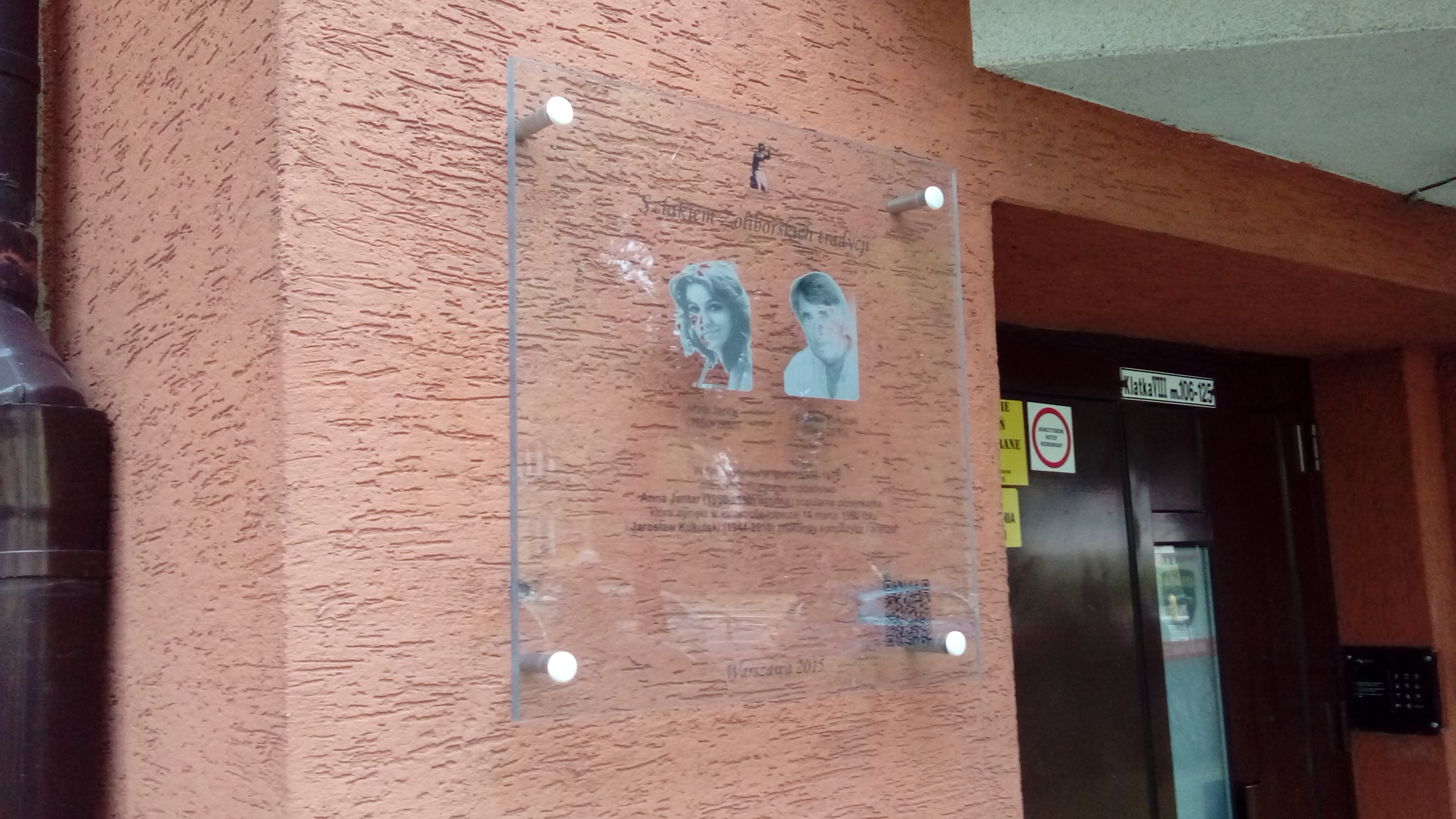
Plaque commemorating Anna Jantar and Jarosław Kukulski at their former apartment in Warsaw

On the occasion of the 35th anniversary of his composing work in 2005, the album Moje Piosenki with his greatest hits was released. For his services to Polish music, President of Poland Aleksander Kwaśniewski awarded Kukulski the Knight's Cross of the Order of Polonia Restituta.

Kukulski had been suffering from abdominal aortic aneurysm for ten years. In May 2010, he underwent a stent graft surgery at a clinic in Nuremberg, Germany. He died on September 13, 2010, at the age of 66. His funeral took place on September 20 and he is buried next to his first wife Anna, at the Wawrzyszewski Cemetery in Warsaw.

In honor of Kukulski, a commemorative plaque was placed on the building he was born at ul. Kościelna 9 in Września. A plaque was also placed at the former residence of Kukulski and Jantar, in the Żoliborz district of Warsaw.
