= Janusz Weiss =

Polish media personality (1948–2023)

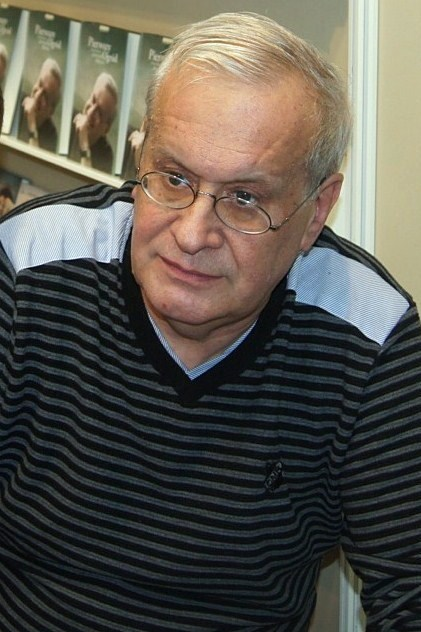
- Weiss in 2012
- Born: 31 May 1948; Warsaw, Poland
- Died: 10 March 2023 (aged 74)
- Occupations: Television and radio personality
- Years active: 1970s–2023

Janusz Alfred Weiss (31 May 1948 – 10 March 2023) was a Polish journalist, actor, television personality and co-founder of one of the most popular radio stations in Poland, Radio ZET.

== Biography ==
Weiss was born on 31 May 1948 as a son of the colonel of the Internal Security Corps Oskar Weiss (of Jewish descent) and Janina Weiss (of Russian descent).

Weiss was studying at the Warsaw University of Technology. In March 1968 he was expelled from the university for his Jewish heritage and activities during 1968 Polish political crisis. In 1970 Weiss started Polish studies at the University of Warsaw, but he had never finished them.

In the early 1970s he founded a cabaret group with Magda Umer, Krzysztof Knittel and Andrzej Wojciechowski. In the 1980s Janusz Weiss was performing in the Polish television as presenter and conferencier.

In 1990 he was one of three founders of the radio station Radio ZET. In the years 1990–2011, Weiss was presenting an audition "Dzwonię do Pani, Pana w bardzo nietypowej sprawie" (Dear Madam, dear Sir, I'm calling you on a most unusual matter), which was one of the most popular radio programming in Poland. In 2000 he published a book in London, "Jeden może, drugi nie" (One can, the other can not).

As an actor he was known for polish Television Theater (1953), Kung-fu (1979) and Damned America (1993).

From 1993 to 2005, he was a host of a game show called Miliard w rozumie, transmitted under license of Polish Scientific Publishers PWN on TVP1.

In 2011 he received the Order of Polonia Restituta.
