= Bogusław Mec =

Polish singer, songwriter, composer, and artist

Bogusław Mec (21 January 1947 – 11 March 2012) was a Polish singer, songwriter, composer, and artist.

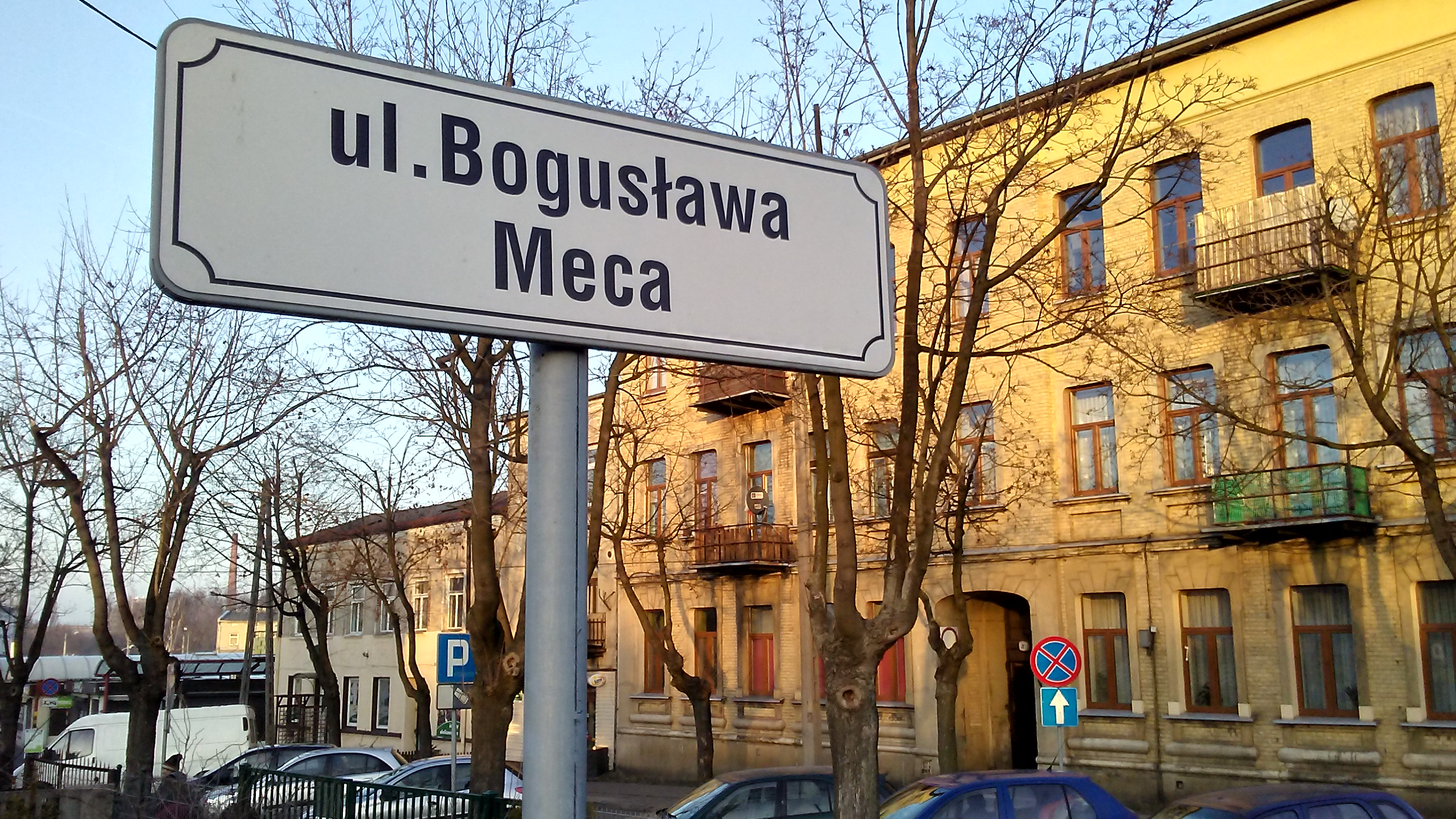
Boguslaw Mec Street in his hometown - Tomaszów Mazowiecki

Bogusław Mec was born in Tomaszów Mazowiecki in 1947. His career began in 1969, at Łódzka Giełda Piosenki song contest. In 1972, at X National Festival of Polish Song in Opole, he received a Ministry of Culture and Art award for the song "Jej portret". In the 1980s, he toured the US, USSR, Yugoslavia, Spain, and East Germany.

Since 2001, he had suffered from leukemia and died on 11 March 2012, at a hospital in Zgierz. He was 65.

== Discography ==
=== Albums ===
- To nie był sen (1971)
- Bogusław Mec 2 (1979)
- Bogusław Mec 3/4 (1981)
- Nie biegnij tak (Pronit) (1983)
- Mały szu (Polskie Nagrania Muza) (1987)
- Jej portret the best of (1995)
- Po kolędzie (1997)
- Malarz i poeta (1998)
- Boże Narodzenia ((1998))
- The best – Jej portret (2004)
- 2004 Recepta na życie (2004)
- Duety (2008)
- Mec Bogusław, The best of (2010)
- Bogusław Mec – Malarz i poeta (4everMusic) (2013)

=== Singles ===
- "Z wielkiej nieśmiałości" (1980)
- "Przyjaciele po to są"
- "Filozof" (wraz z Justyną Steczkowską) (2008)
- "Stare buty Van Gogha" (wraz z Frument Project) (2011)

== Art exhibitions ==
- Art exhibition in Stockholm (1990)
- Art exhibition in Prag (1991)
- One-person art exhibition (1992)
- Art exhibition in Toronto (1992)
- Art exhibition in the USA (1993)
