= National Festival of Polish Song in Opole =

Annual music festival in Opole, Poland

National Festival of Polish Song in Opole Krajowy Festiwal Piosenki Polskiej w Opolu
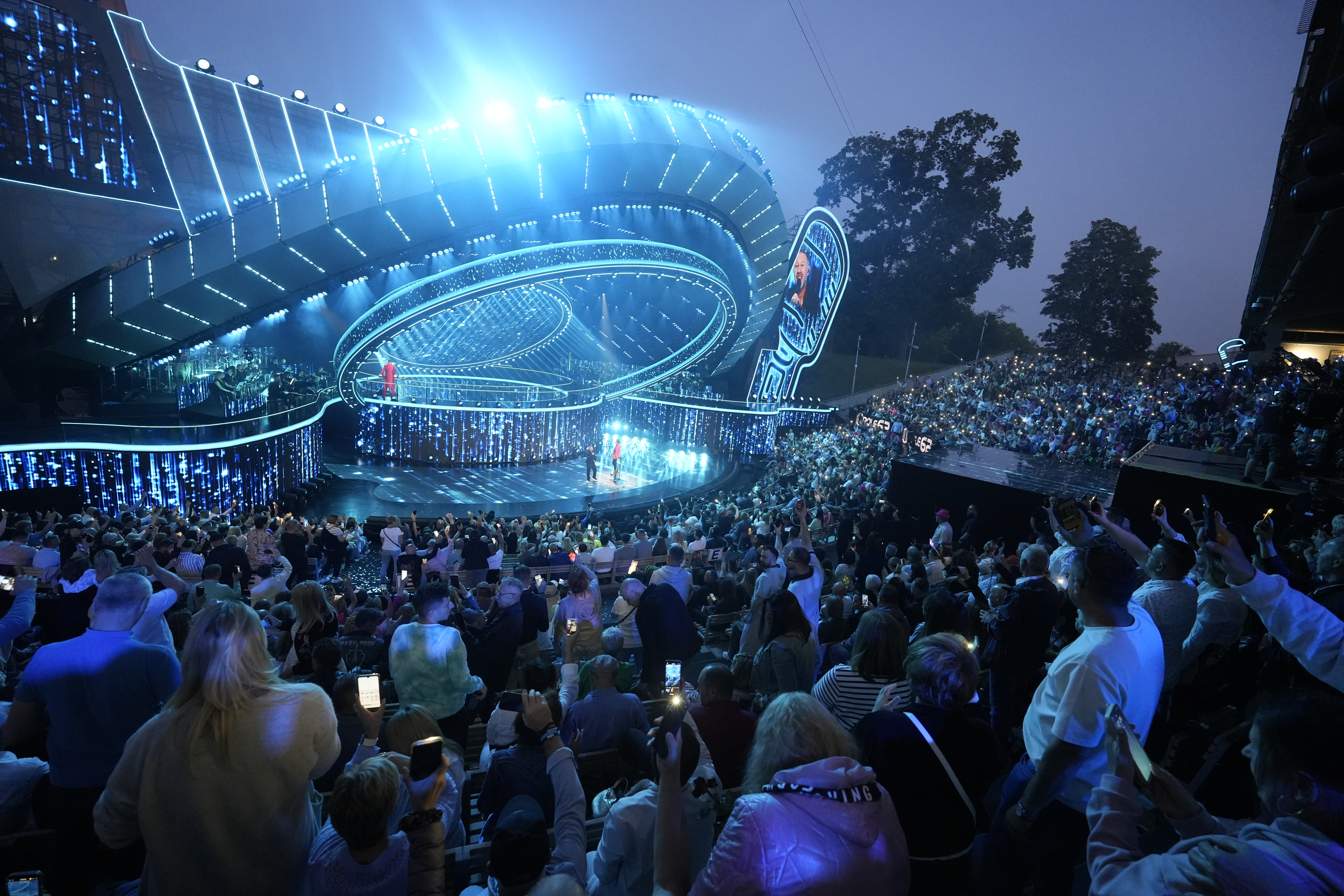
- Opole amphitheater, main stage of the National Festival of Polish Song, June 2025
- Location: Opole
- Years active: 1963–present
- Patrons: Polskie Radio and Telewizja Polska

The National Festival of Polish Song in Opole (Polish: Krajowy Festiwal Piosenki Polskiej w Opolu, KFPP), commonly known as the Opole Festival (Polish: Festiwal w Opolu) is an annual music festival in Opole, Poland. Together with the Sopot Festival it is one of the two most important music festivals in Poland.

The Opole Festival is meant as a summary of the past year's achievements by Polish song writers and performers. It is also the most important cultural event in Opole, with a tradition going back 50 years. It usually takes place in late June, since 2011 lasting for two days (Friday and Saturday) and from 2013 again it takes three days. During the KFPP both the hits of the past season and new debut songs are performed; there is also a tournament of performing debuts.

== History ==
Established in 1963, its traditional patrons include Polskie Radio and Telewizja Polska, as well as the Society of Friends of Opole. The only year the Festival did not take place was 1982, due to martial law in Poland. Since the 1980s it has included a rock section and since 2001 a hip-hop section. The awards granted at the festival are:

- Karolinka - the Anna Jantar Award, for the winner of the Debiuty (Debuts) show,
- Grand Prix - the Karol Musioł Award, for the best premiered song, awarded by the jury,
- Kryształowy Kamerton (Crystal Tuning Fork), for the best author/composer,
- Superjedynka (Super One) - since 2000, awarded in several categories (singer, song, band, pop album, rock album, hip-hop album, alternative album, videoclip, music event of the year).

The festival takes place at the Millennium Amphitheatre (Amfiteatr Tysiąclecia), which was opened in June 1963, in time for the first festival. The amphitheatre was built on the initiative of Opole's mayor, Karol Musioł, and designed by the architect Florian Jesionowski. It has become one of the symbols of the city of Opole, and it is located in the spot where an early Slavic settlement once stood. Well-preserved remnants of wooden houses and traces of pavements were discovered by archaeologists, who suggested opening a museum of ancient Opole on the spot. In the spring of 2011, the amphitheatre was remodelled, and its capacity was reduced from 4,800 to 3,653.

== See also ==
- Music of Poland
- Pol'and'Rock Festival
- Open'er Festival
- Sopot International Song Festival
- Orange Warsaw Festival
