= Eleni Tzoka =

Polish singer

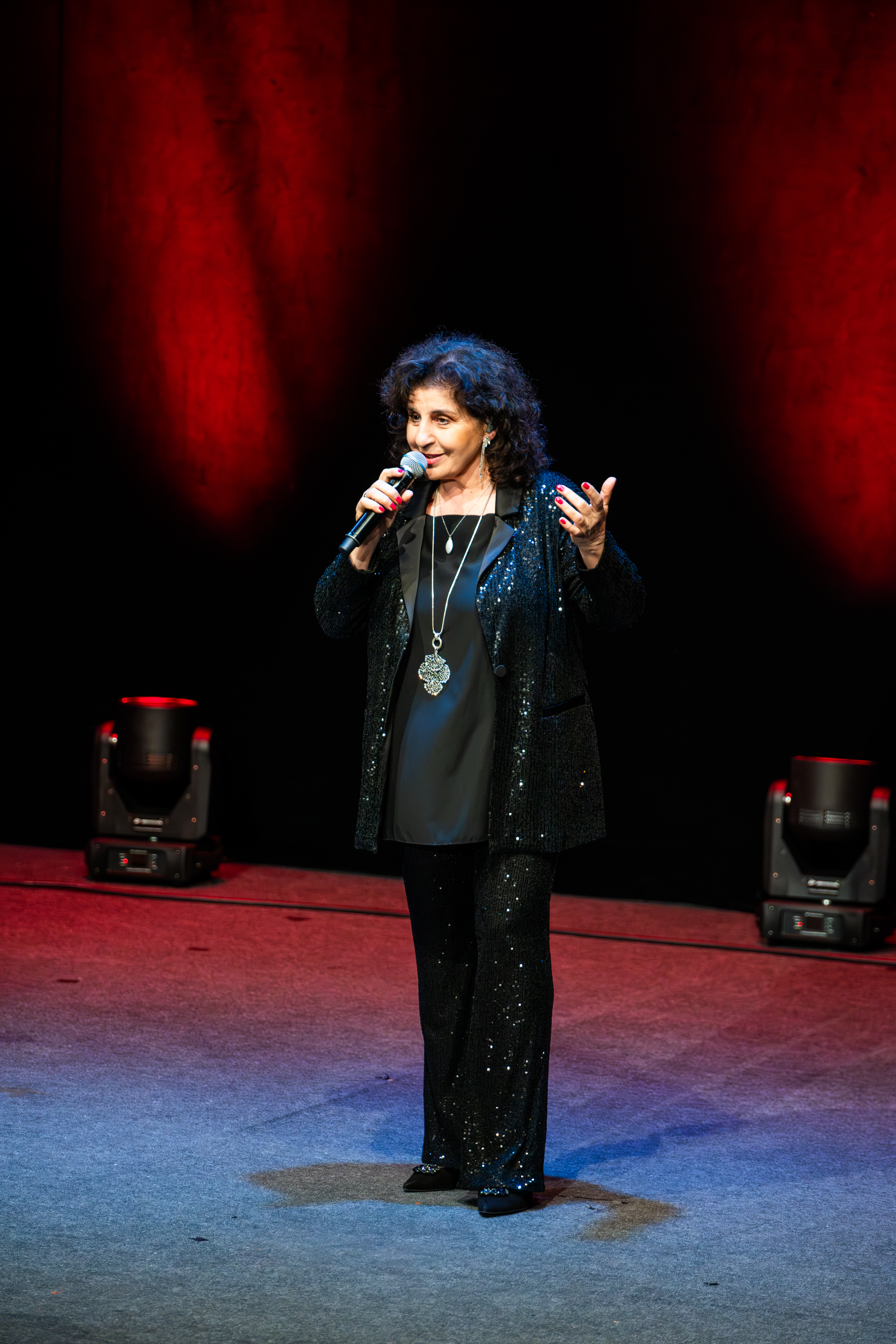
Eleni Tzoka, 2024

Eleni Tzoka (née Milopoulou; 27 April 1956, Bielawa) is a Polish singer of Greek descent.

== Biography ==
Tzoka was born to a Greek family which emigrated to Poland in the 1950s. At an early age, she was familiarized with music by her parents and numerous siblings (she was the ninth child) who would constantly play or sing. She first sang in public when she attended elementary school. At that time she belonged to a children's group Niezapominajki ("Forget-me-nots"). Several years later she became a vocalist in Ballada, a group that was formed in her secondary school.

Tzoka started her professional career in 1975 when she joined Prometheus, a newly founded music band that was mainly active in Sopot. On 20 July of the same year, she debuted at a concert in nearby Gdańsk.

Eleni, as she is commonly referred to in Poland, released her first solo album, Ty jak niebo, ja – jak obłok, in 1980 (although she had recorded an LP album with Prometheus earlier) titled Po słonecznej stronie życia ("On the sunny side of life'", 1977). After the release of her solo album, she became popular. She began giving concerts all over Poland as well as abroad. Among many other countries, she visited Australia, France, Sweden, Canada, and the United States, where she sang for the Polish diaspora.

Tzoka participated in the National Festival of Polish Song in Opole four times: in 1984, 1990, 1991 and 1993.

== Honours and awards ==
It was reported that she openly forgave the killer of her only child. When she was informed about her daughter's death, she immediately phoned the mother of Afrodyta's boyfriend and told her without anger that they had "lost their children". She was honoured in 1999 with the annual Saint Rita of Cascia prize, awarded to women of different religious beliefs who have overcome a tragic event in their lives.

Tzoka has been awarded many other prizes. In 2002, she was given the statuette of Złota Muza Polskich Nagrań from a Polish state music company Polskie Nagrania. Apart from music-related awards, she was also honoured (2003) with the Złote Serce (Heart of Gold) prize from the Saint Stanisław Kostka Foundation for the Disabled Children and Youth in Katowice for her "generosity, kindness, understanding, co-operativeness, namely everything that makes the realization of laudable aims for the environment of disabled children and youth possible".

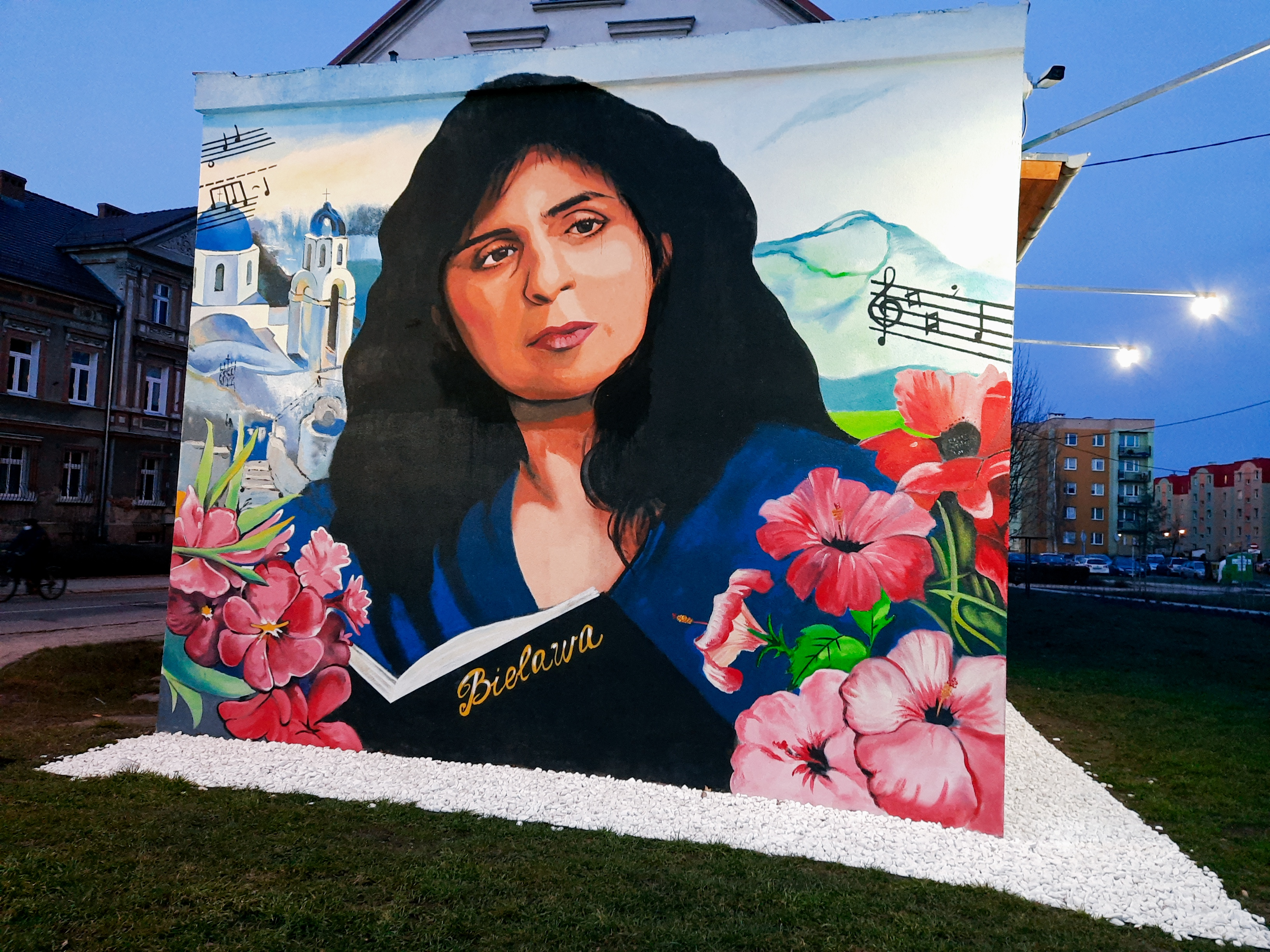
Mural of Eleni in her hometown of Bielawa

In 2004, she was given the Medal of Saint Brother Albert for her commitment to charity related with the help for the people living with AIDS as well as the disabled. The official justification for the prize included her meetings with the youth and the charity concerts given in social assistance centres and prisons. Tzoka is also a Knight of the Order of Smile.

== Family ==
She is married to Fotis Tzokas, brother of Kostas Tzokas, the founder of Prometheus. Kostas is currently her personal manager as well as the composer of some of her songs. In 1994, Tzoka's 17-year-old daughter, Afrodyta, was murdered by her ex-boyfriend.

== Authorship ==
Tzoka is the author of a book Nic miłości nie pokona (Nothing Will Defeat Love) published in 2006. This illustrated album contains an interview given to a Pauline monk, fr. Robert Łukaszuk, in which she talks about her life, human sufferings, love, the meaning of charity, as well as her artistic experiences.

== Style of music ==
Prometheus, the band Tzoka has belonged to since 1975, typically played traditional Greek music, including Greek dances.

=== Discography ===
- Po słonecznej stronie życia (1978)
- S'agapo – moja miłość (1979)
- Buzuki disco (1980)
- Ty – jak niebo, ja – jak obłok (1980)
- Lovers (1982)
- Grecja raz jeszcze (1983)
- Morze snu (1984)
- Muzyka twoje imię ma (1985)
- Eleni... 10 (1986)
- Kolędy polskie śpiewa Eleni (1986)
- Miłość jak wino (1987)
- Wakacyjny flirt (1990)
- Sound from Greece (1990)
- 24 golden greats (1991)
- Złote przeboje (1992)
- Przystań pod gwiazdami (1992)
- W rytmie Zorby (1995)
- Nic miłości nie pokona (1996)
- Kolędy polskie śpiewa Eleni vol. 2 (1998)
- Za wszystkie noce – złota kolekcja (1999)
- Moje credo (1999)
- Coś z Odysa (2001)
- Miłości ślad (2013)
