= Institute Polonicus =

Polonicus is an award given to members of European Polish diaspora by Institut Polonicus, for building international dialogue, movements of unity and promoting Polish culture in Europe and the rest of the world.

== History ==
The first ceremony of handing the statuette POLONICUS took place on the 2 of May, 2009 during the festival at the cross of three borders- Belgium, Netherlands and Germany, called Dreilaendereck, near Aachen. Since 2010, the prize is handed at the annual ceremony organized on the day of the European Day of Polish diaspora. It occurs in the Hall of Coronation at the town hall of Aachen. The creator is Wiesław Lewicki, the Chairman of the Jury Prize. A longtime activist of the Polish community in Germany and the President of the European Institute of Cultural and Media Polonicus VOG.

== The Philosophy of Polonicus ==
The idea of the Polonicus awards is a reflection of the old truth - we should respect others, and then they will respect us . Polonicus is designed for the people who builds their social and material status, in the terms of national aspects. Rewarded figures stands for Polish culture and values as well as implementing and promoting them in the Europe. The award honor those whose activities are related to unification and promotion of European integration and building a positive image of Poles all around the world.

== Patronage ==
First patrons were the Kongres Polonii Niemieckiej and Konwent Organizacji Polskich in Germany. Since 2012 the prize has become European and now patronage belong to European Union of Polish Communities. Marek Prawda, ambassador in Berlin possesses personal patronage of the two first editions, in the 2011 was passed to the Speaker of the Senate Bogdan Borusewicz.

== The Statue of Polonicus ==
The statue of a POLONICUS represent brave winged figure, look like dynamic young man. It is made of bronze with a height about 38 cm. The founder of the statue is Wiesław Lewicki, and the builder- Stanisław Szroborz the winner of the competition for the best project in 2008. Firstly the base of the statue was also made from bronze but now it is made from marble. The name of the rewarded institution or person and the year is written on the base. The winners receive also the diploma.

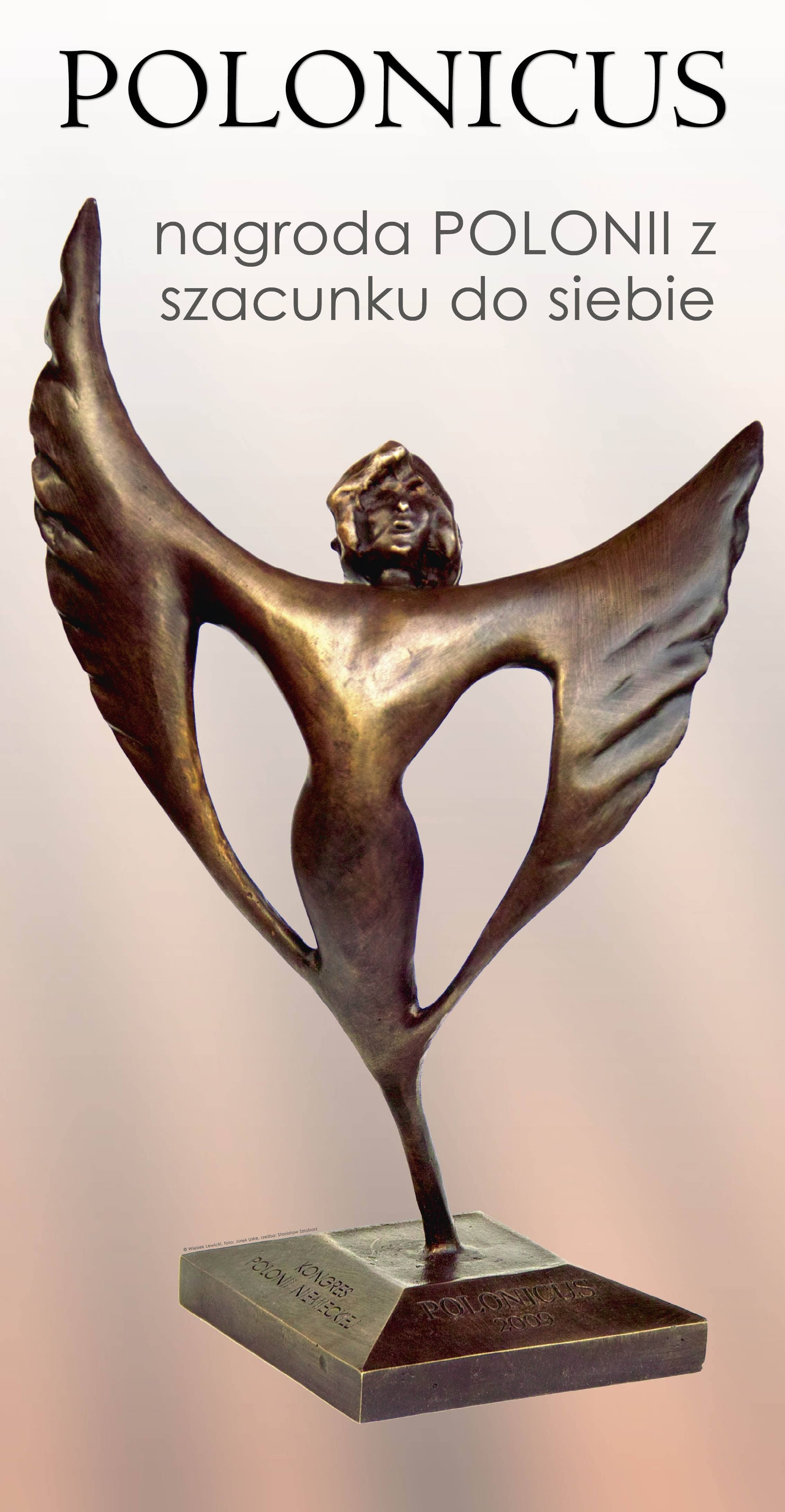
The statue of a POLONICUS represent brave winged figure, look like dynamic young man

== Selection of Awardees ==
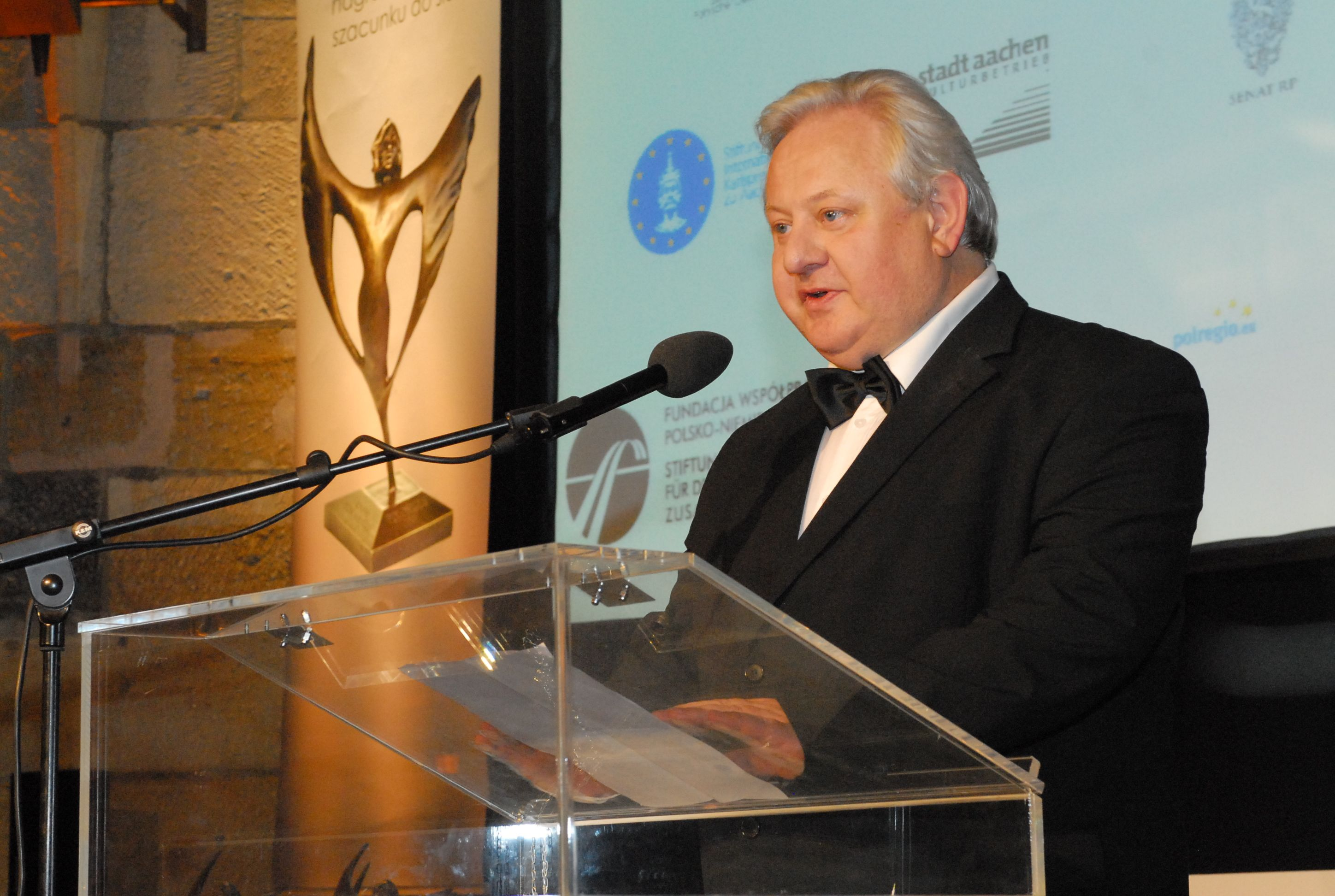
President of the Institute Wiesław Lewicki

The winner is selected by five-person jury consisting of the president, Polish senator, member of the secretariat and representatives of the Polish community EUWP. The president may establish five additional consulters among Polish organizations in Europe and European offices and institutions. Jury choose one person in each category, and has the right to cancel the award in one or in several categories. The special award is separate from the others categories. Candidates have to be citizens or employees in the European Union, and possess the nationality of one European country. Suggestions of the potential winners needs to be deliver to the jury before the end of the year. Names of the honored are announced at the end of February each year.

== Categories ==
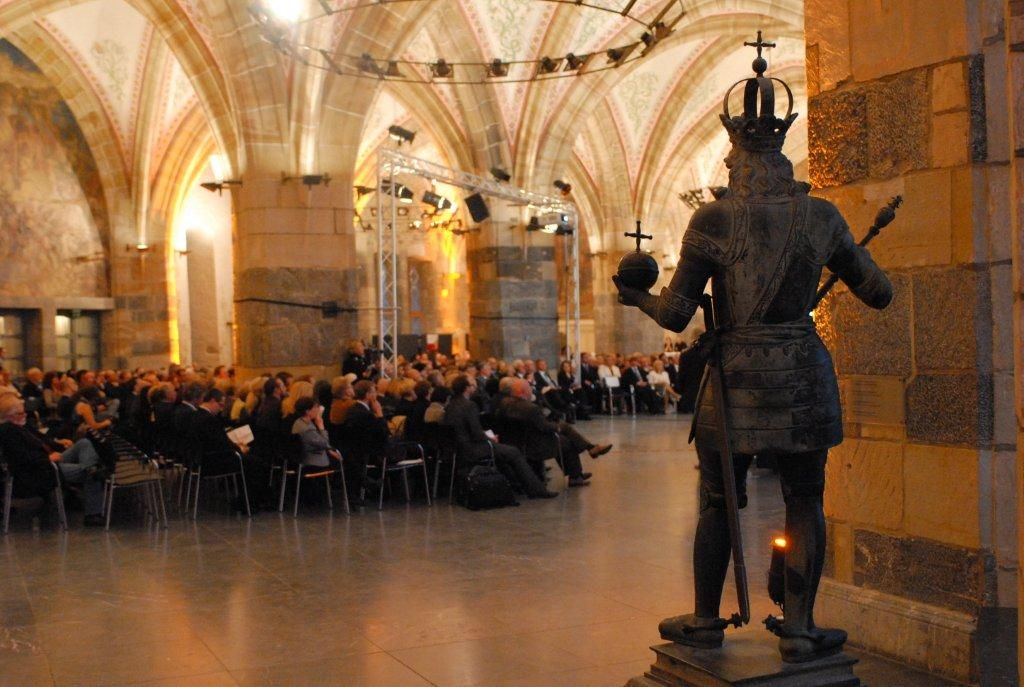
Hall of Charlemagne in Aachen

=== Culture ===
In this category Polonicus is dedicate to the creators of culture or individuals who acting on behalf of Polish or European culture. Promote Polish culture, glorified the achievements and Polish values.

=== The coordination of Polish life ===
The price distinguish people who has huge positive impact on the Polish diaspora in Germany.

=== Polish - German dialogue ===
The award is given to persons engaged in the development of cooperation, dialogue and friendship between Polish and German nations.

=== Special prize "Polonicus" ===
Candidates in this category may be the person whose activities produce tangible results in any field of economic, cultural, scientific, political or social. Individuals who are distinguished because of their activity, creativity and commitment.

== Honored ==
=== May 2009 ===
Culture: Tomasz Glanc, composer and musician activist from Montabaour
Polish-German dialogue: Olaf Müller, Head of the Department of Culture City of Aachen
Poles life coordination: Paulina Lemke, member of union "Zgoda", artist from Düsseldorf
Special Award: Steffen Möller, actor, author of the book "Viva Polonia" from Wuppertal

=== May 2010 ===
Culture: prof. Zofia Wisłocka musician, conductor and composer
Polish-German dialogue: prof. Władysław Bartoszewski , politician, journalist, social activist
Poles life coordination: Associate professor Eng. Piotr Małoszewski, the chairman of the Christian Centre for the Promotion of Culture, Tradition and Polish Language in Germany.
Special Award: Associate professor Eng. Jerzy Buzek, President of the European Parliament in 2010-2012

=== May 2011 ===
Culture: prof. Karl Dedecius, translator and publisher of Polish literature
Polish-German dialogue: Cornelia Pieper, Minister of Foreign Affairs, responsible for cultural contacts with foreign countries
Poles life coordination: Władyslaw Pisarek, vice-president of the Union of Poles in Germany "Zgoda"
Special award: prof. Norman Davies- historian

=== May 2012 ===
Culture: Krystyna Janda, actress
Polish-German dialogue: dr. Angelica Schwall-Düren, Minister of Federal, European and media affairs in NRW
Poles life coordination: Helena Miziniak, president of the European Union of Polish Communities
Special Award: Excellence prof. Dr. Alfons Nossol, Senior archbishop of Opole

=== April 2013 ===
Culture: prof. Władysław Miodunka, Polish humanist, linguist.
Polish-German dialogue: Basil Kerski, director of the European Solidarity Centre in Gdańsk, chief of the bilingual "Magazine Polish-German Dialog", a political scientist and essayist
Poles life coordination: Maria and Czesław Gołębiewski, the founders of the restaurant "Grand Canyon", promoters of Polish and German culture in Oberhausen
Special Award: Andrzej Wajda, the Polish film director, winner of an Oscar for lifetime achievement in 2000, and numerous European film awards

European Institute of Cultural and Media Polonicus was established in 2011 and registered in Belgium, placed in Aachen. Institute Polonicus statute based on Christian and humanistic values of European culture. The main objective of the association is to organize and award annual prizes- "Polonicus" and organizing events. The purpose is to promote European integration and the promotion of Polish culture through projects and events like for example, workshops, symposia, concerts, trips, cultural events. The Institute provide cooperation between Polish citizen of the EU regions.
