= Poles in Germany =

Ethnic group

- Rodło, a symbol of the Polish minority in Germany, originally used by the Union of Poles in Germany.

Total population
- 2,100,022 (2020)

Languages
- Polish, German, Silesian, Kashubian

Religion
- 75.5% Roman Catholic, 13.8% non-religious, 8.0% Protestantism

Related ethnic groups
- Poles, Germans, Kashubians, Poles in the United States

Poles in Germany (German: Polen) are the second largest Polish diaspora (Polonia) in the world and the biggest in Europe. Estimates of the number of Poles living in Germany vary from 2 million to about 3 million people living that might be of Polish descent. Their number has quickly decreased over the years, and according to the latest census, there are approximately 866,690 Poles in Germany. The main Polonia organisations in Germany are the Union of Poles in Germany and Congress of Polonia in Germany. Polish surnames are relatively common in Germany, especially in the Ruhr area (Ruhr Poles).

== History ==
=== Early history ===
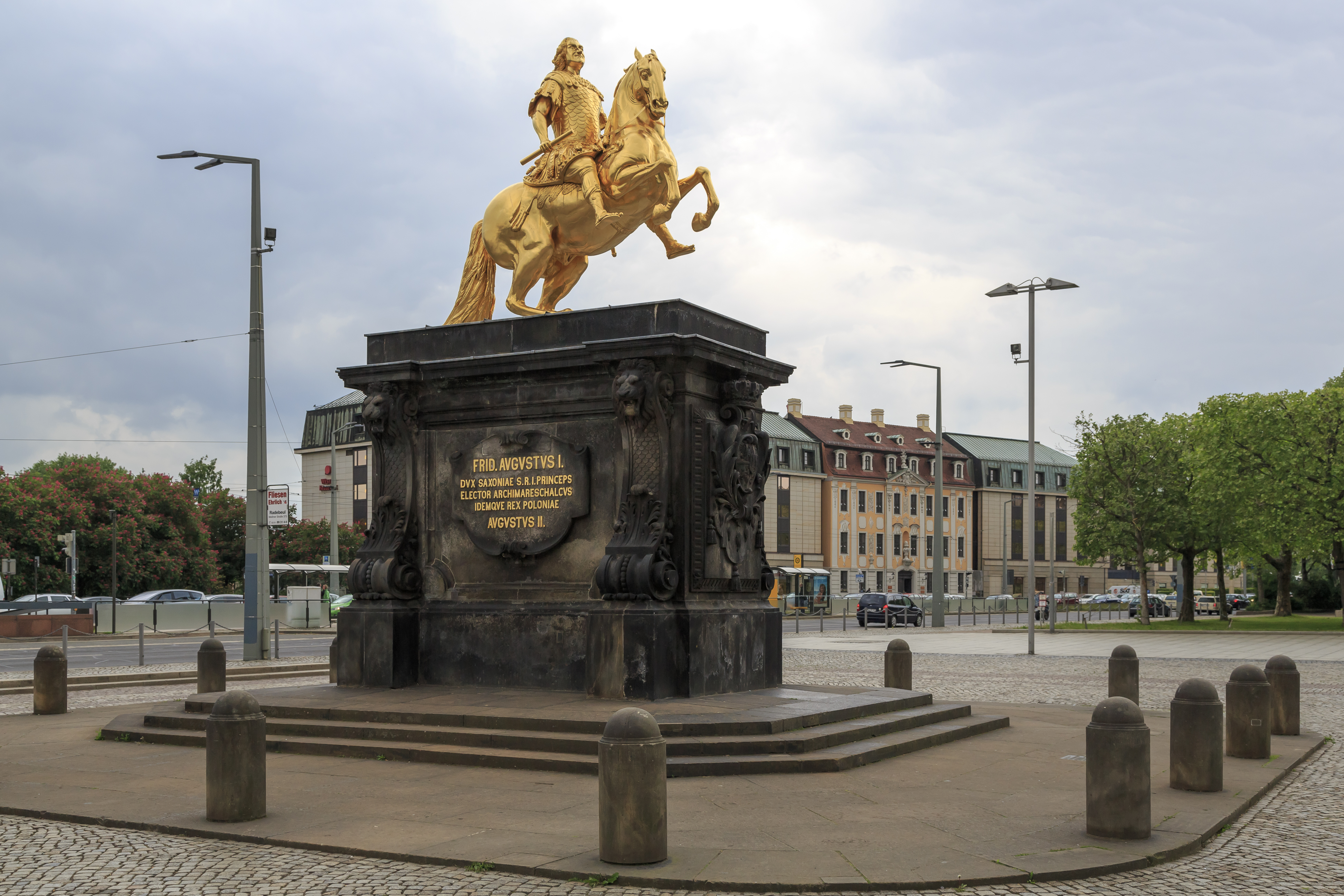
Monument of King Augustus II the Strong in Dresden

Some parts of modern eastern Germany formed part of medieval Poland, i.e. the western Lubusz Land, Lusatia and Hither Pomerania, before passing under the suzerainty of various German states. Since the Middle Ages, Poles have arrived to German states in small numbers. A number of Polish princesses married various German princes and thus resided in present-day Germany. The Polish Nation was one of the four recognized nations of the Leipzig University since its establishment in the 15th century, with many Poles attending it throughout the centuries.

Poles settled in present-day Germany more numerously during the 18th-century Polish-Saxon union e.g. in Dresden and Leipzig. Dresden was named Royal-Polish Residential City after Augustus II the Strong became King of Poland in 1697. Contacts between the Poles and Sorbs in Lusatia, since 1635 ruled by Saxony, and previously also ruled by Poland in the Middle Ages, resumed, coincidentally at a time when the Sorbian national revival began and resistance to Germanization emerged, and Poles influenced the Sorbs' national and cultural activities. Some Polish nobles owned estates in Lusatia.

=== Late modern period ===
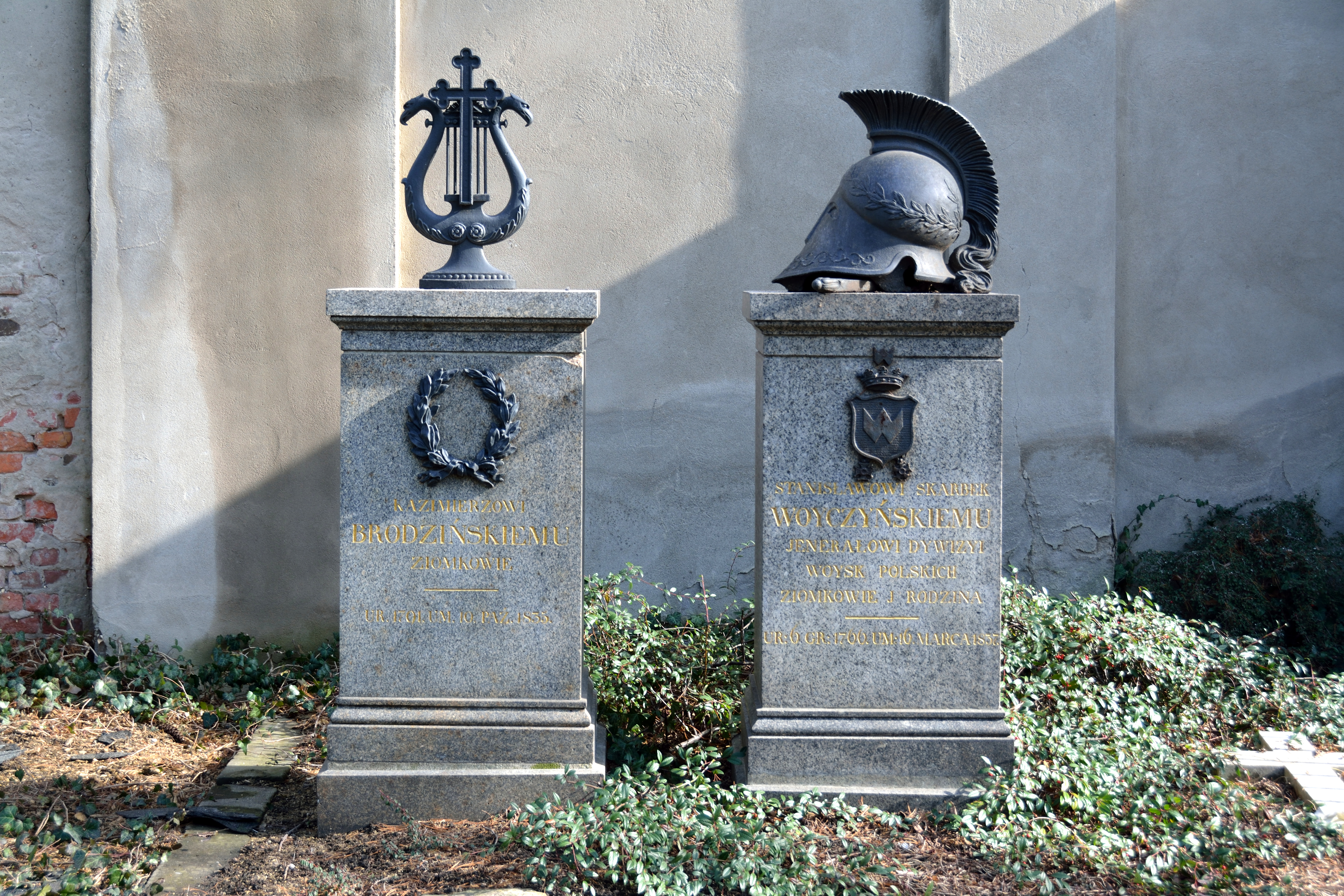
Graves of poet Kazimierz Brodziński and General Stanisław Wojczyński at the Old Catholic Cemetery, Dresden

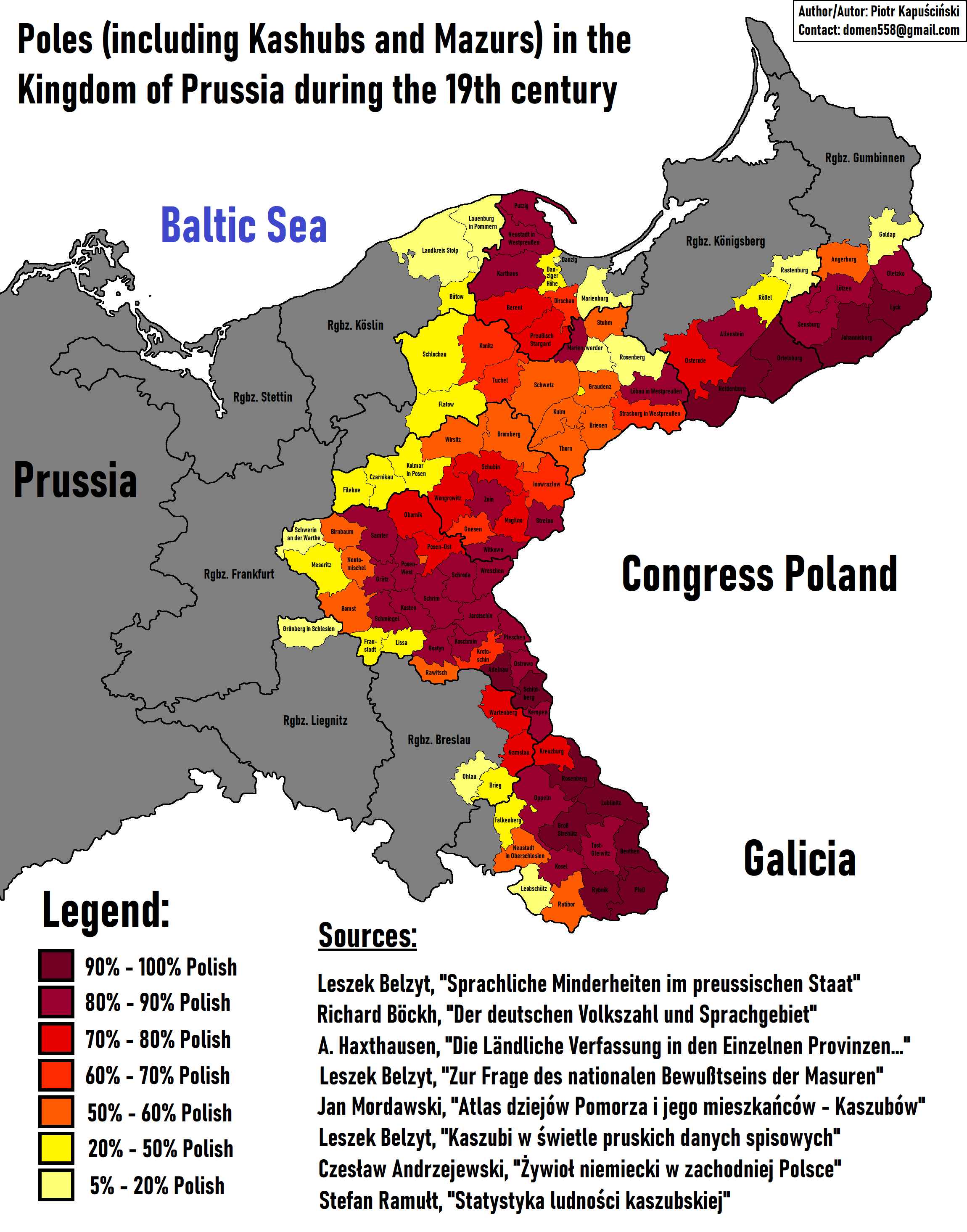
Poles in the Kingdom of Prussia during the 19th century: 90% - 100% Polish 80% - 90% Polish 70% - 80% Polish 60% - 70% Polish 50% - 60% Polish 20% - 50% Polish 5% - 20% Polish

Since the Partitions of Poland in 1772, 1793 and 1795 and Poland's partial incorporation into Prussia, a large Polish ethnic group existed inside Prussia's borders, especially in the new provinces of Posen and West Prussia. Prussia enacted anti-Polish policies aimed at the Germanisation of Poles, whereas Saxony maintained a friendly policy toward Poles, both already settled as well as refugees from partitioned Poland. At the turn of the 18th and 19th centuries, the largest centers of Poles in present-day Germany were Dresden and Berlin. In 1793, preparations for the Polish Kościuszko Uprising were initiated by Tadeusz Kościuszko in Dresden in response to the Second Partition of Poland. Many Poles fled to Saxony from the Russian Partition of Poland after unsuccessful Polish uprisings, including the artistic and political elite, such as composer Frédéric Chopin (1835 and 1836), war hero Józef Bem (1832) and writer Adam Mickiewicz (c.1829). Mickiewicz wrote one of his greatest works, Dziady, Part III, in Dresden.

The antagonism between the Polish and German populations dates from the Revolutions of 1848, triggered both by the Poles' desire to regain their independence and the Germans' desire to incorporate the lands of the Prussian Partition of Poland into a planned German Reich. Poles had their representatives in the Landtag of Prussia and Reichstag.

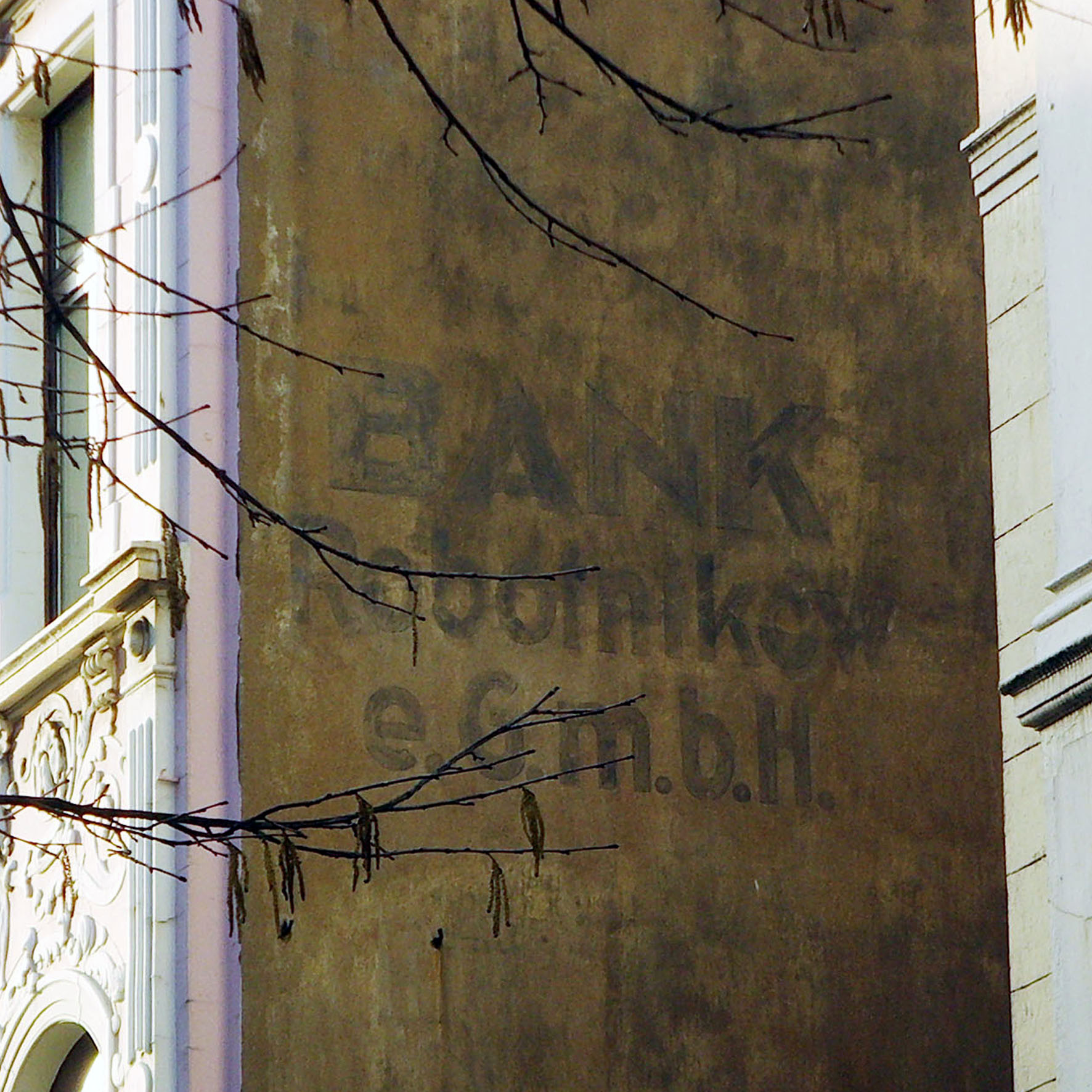
Old inscription for the Polish Workers' Bank in Bochum

Between 1870 and 1914, some 3.5 million Poles have emigrated to Germany, including 1.2 million in internal migration from Polish territories under German rule, 1.2 million from the Russian Partition of Poland and 1.1 million from the Austrian Partition of Poland. Since the right to establish national or ethnic political organizations was restricted, the first Polish organizations in Germany were cultural organizations focused on protecting Polish identity and maintaining ties to Polish culture.

During the late 19th century rapid industrialisation in the Ruhr region attracted about 500,000 Poles, especially from East Prussia, West Prussia, Greater Poland, and Silesia, including Kashubians and Masurians. They comprised about 30% of the Ruhr area population by 1910. Participants in this migration are called the Ruhr Poles. Ruhr Poles formed a thriving Polish community and established numerous Polish organizations, bookstores, companies, co-operative shops, banks, sports clubs, singing clubs, and local Polish-language newspapers were issued in Bochum, Dortmund and Herne. The main center of the Polish community of the Ruhr area was Bochum, and since 1905, many organizations and enterprises were based at Am Kortländer Street, which was hence nicknamed "Little Warsaw". By 1914, over 1,000 Polish organizations were formed in the Ruhr with over 111,000 members. Polish candidates won 35 seats in the Rhine Province parliament in the 1914 elections. The two most successful and popular football clubs of the Ruhr region, FC Schalke 04 and Borussia Dortmund, were co-founded by Poles, and the former was even mockingly called the Polackenverein ("Polack club") by the Germans because of its many players of Polish origin.

Several Polish noble families had residences in Berlin. The Radziwiłł Palace became the seat of the Reich Chancellery in the 1870s, whereas the Raczyński Palace was demolished in the 1880s to make space for the German parliament building.

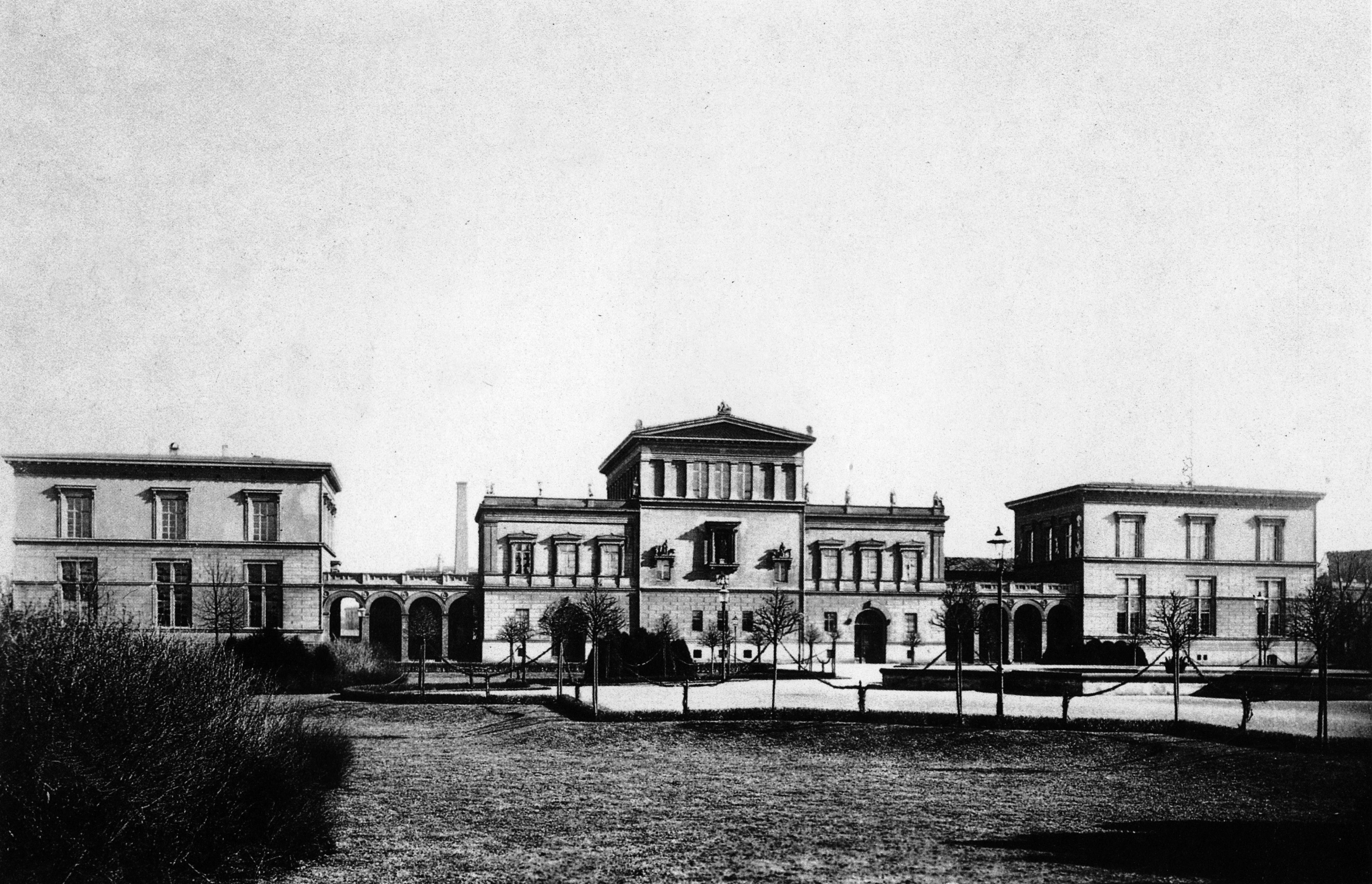
Raczyński Palace in Berlin in 1876

After 1870, the Poles were under an increasing pressure of Germanisation, and the Kulturkampf attacked their Catholic Church. Most Catholic bishops were imprisoned or exiled. The teaching language which had previously been Polish in the predominantly Polish-speaking areas in Prussia was replaced by German as teaching language, even in religious education where Polish priests were replaced by German teachers. However, these Germanisation policies were not at all successful. In contrast, it led to the political awakening of many Poles and to the establishment of a wealth of Polish economic, political and cultural associations which were aimed at preserving Polish culture and Polish interests, especially in the Province of Posen and in the Ruhr area. In the Ruhr, Germany banned the use of the Polish language in schools (since 1873), in mines (since 1899), and at public gatherings (since 1908). Polish publishing houses and bookstores were often searched by the German police, and Polish patriotic books and publications were confiscated. In 1909, the Central Office for Monitoring the Polish Movement in the Rhine-Westphalian Industrial Districts (Zentralstelle fur Uberwachung der Polenbewegung im Rheinisch-Westfalischen Industriebezirke) was established by the Germans in Bochum. The policy of forced cultural Germanisation alienated large parts of the Polish-speaking population against the German authorities and produced nationalistic sentiments on both sides. This policy was consistently pursued by Germany, with breaks in 1890–1894 and 1934–1938.

Polish national activity in Germany weakened during World War I as many Polish activist were conscripted into the German Army. Many were sent to the Western Front and were killed in battles there, as Germany feared potential desertions by Poles fighting on Polish soil on the Eastern Front. Up to 850,000 Poles were conscripted to the German Army during the war.

=== Interbellum and World War II ===
After the First World War, the predominantly Polish provinces had to be ceded to the newly created Polish Republic. Polish-speaking minorities remained especially in Upper Silesia and parts of East Prussia. During the 1922 to 1937 term of the German-Polish Accord on Upper Silesia (Geneva Agreement), signed in Geneva on 15 May 1922, German nationals of Polish ethnicity in Upper Silesia had judicial status as a national minority under the auspices of the League of Nations (likewise the Poles of German ethnicity in the Polish Silesian Voivodeship). In 1922, various Polish organizations were unified into the Union of Poles in Germany, the chief organization of Poles in Germany to this day, by the initiative of which the Association of National Minorities in Germany was formed in 1924, which also gathered Danes, Sorbs, Frisians and Lithuanians. According to the 1925 census, Germany was inhabited by some 784,000 Poles, however, this number is probably underestimated, and according to Polish estimates, the number exceeded 930,000 at the time.

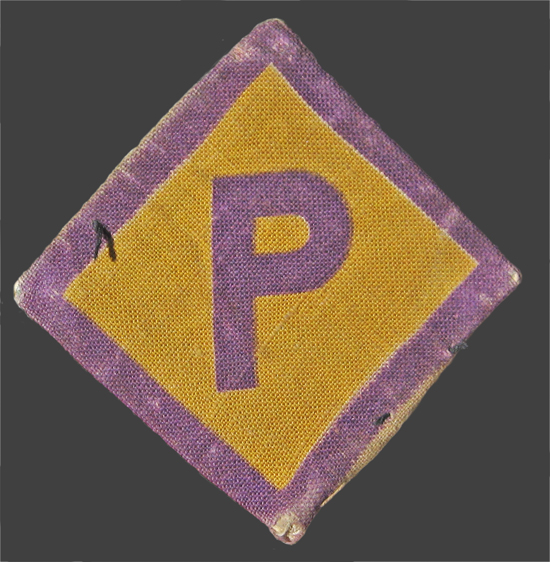
"P" badge introduced by Nazi Germany for Polish forced workers

After the rise of the Nazis, all Polish activities were systematically constrained, since mid-1937 also in Upper Silesia. However, in August 1939, the leadership of the Polish community was arrested and interned in the Nazi concentration camps of Sachsenhausen and Buchenwald. On 7 September 1939, shortly after the outbreak of World War II, the Nazi government of the Third Reich stripped the Polish community in Germany of its minority status. This was formally confirmed by Hermann Göring's decree of 27 February 1940. In September 1939, the Gestapo carried out arrests of prominent Poles in Berlin, Dresden, Leipzig, Bremen, Hamburg, Hanover and the Ruhr. Germany also closed Polish organizations, newspapers, printing shops, schools, libraries and enterprises, and seized their properties, which was formally sanctioned post factum by Nazi decrees of 1940. During the war, over 2.8 million Poles, including women and children, were deported to forced labour in Germany.

After the end of World War II, there were over 1.7 million Polish displaced persons in Allied-occupied Germany, including 700,000 in the Soviet occupation zone, 540,000 in the British occupation zone, 400,000 in the American occupation zone and 68,000 in the French occupation zone.

== Effect of the Oder-Neisse border ==
As the result of the implementation of the Oder-Neisse border, the most important centers of Polishness in Germany, Upper Silesia and parts of East Prussia, fell within west-shifted Poland. The historic German-Polish contact zone, which extended through Upper Silesia, and then roughly along the German-Polish border of 1937 and, in addition, through southern East Prussia, was dissolved in the wake of the Flight and expulsion of Germans from Poland during and after World War II. Later, many bi-cultural families, such as Mazurians and Upper Silesians chose emigration to West or East Germany.

== Today ==
Polish population relative to total Polish population in Germany (as of 2021)

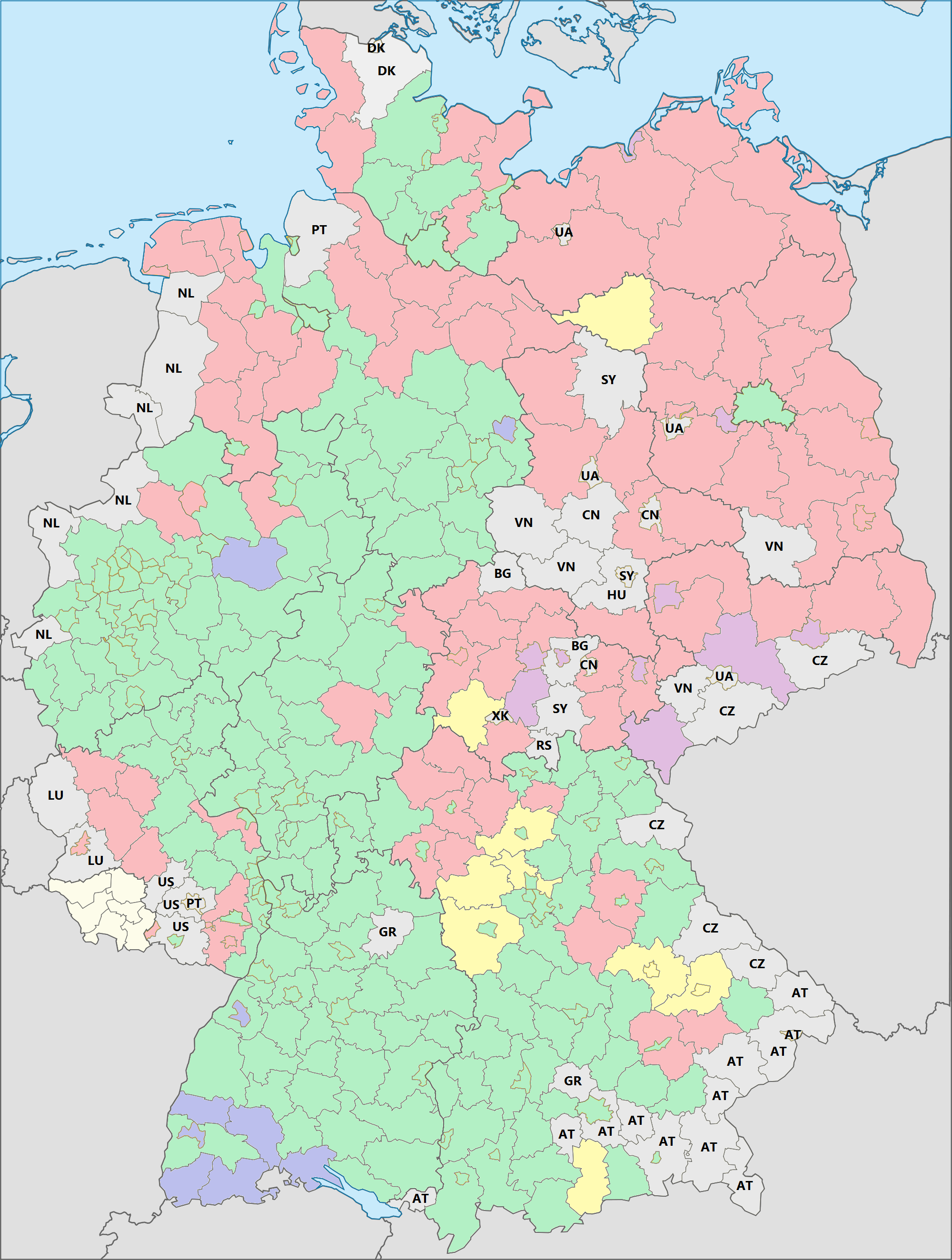
Districts where Poles make up the largest group of foreigners in red (as of 2015)

Today the German government does not recognise German nationals of Polish ethnicity as a national minority. As a result, according to Polish agencies, Germany is not recognising the right of self-determination of the Polish minority in Germany. After Poland joined the European Union, several organisations of Poles in Germany attempted to restore the pre-war official minority status, particularly claiming that the Nazi decree is void. While the initial memorandum to the Bundestag remained unanswered, in December 2009 the Minority Commission of the Council of Europe obliged the German government to formally respond to the demands within four months.

The position of the German government is that after the German territorial losses after World War II, the current Polish minority has no century-old roots in the remaining German territory, because Germany lost all the territories where people of German and Polish ethnicity overlapped. Since they are therefore only recent immigrants, they do not fulfill the requirements of a national minority according to the Framework Convention for the Protection of National Minorities and the Treaty of Good Neighbourship. Being German citizens, they still retain all civil and political rights every German citizen possesses, and therefore can voice their will in the political system.

About 10,000 Polish citizens have recently moved to German localities along the Polish-German border, depopulated after the unification of Germany. Poles live especially within the Szczecin metropolitan area, which, although centered on the Polish city of Szczecin, also extends to the municipalities on the German side of the border, such as Gartz and Löcknitz.

== Population distribution ==
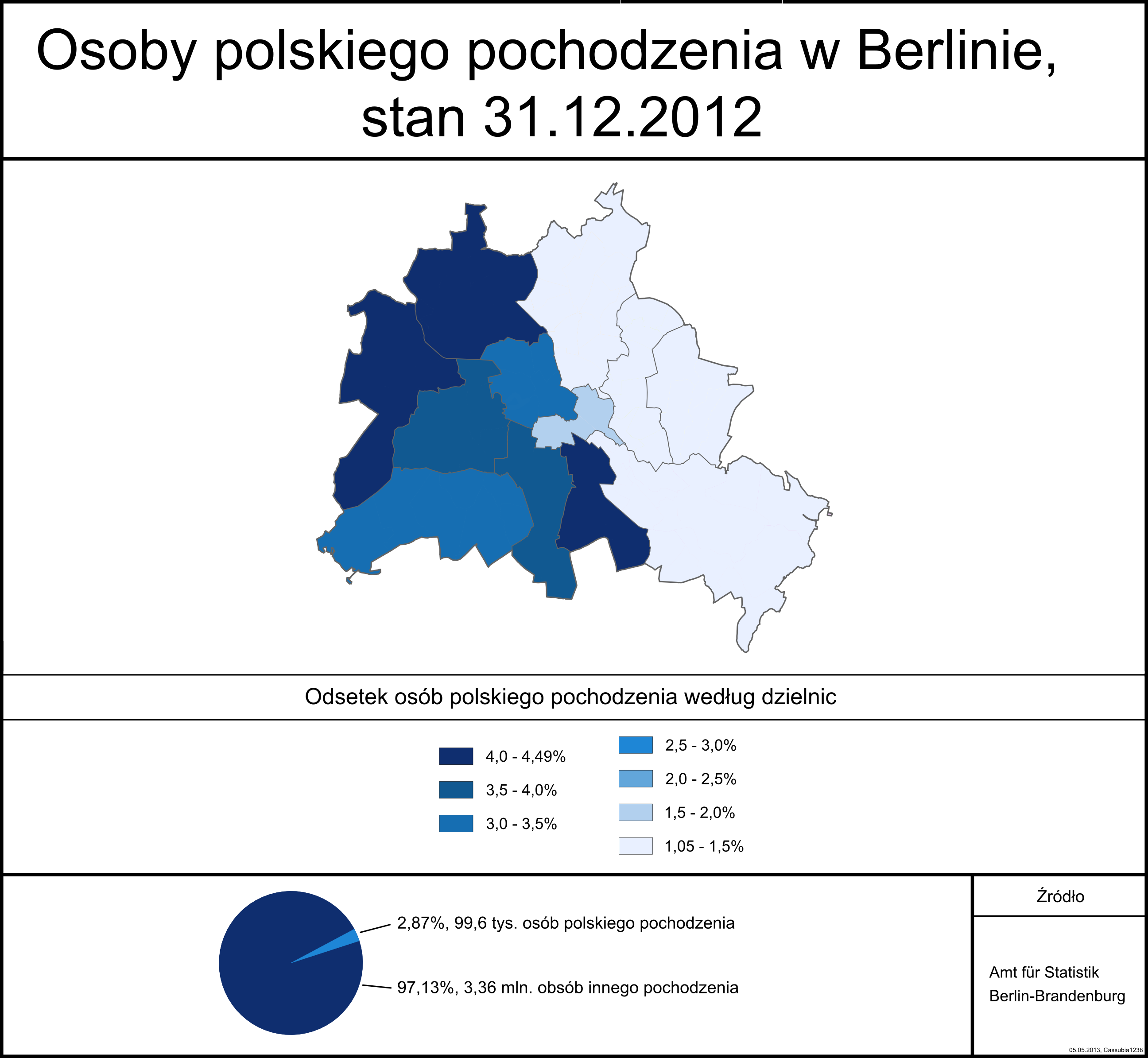
Map showing percentage of population who are of Polish origin in Berlin

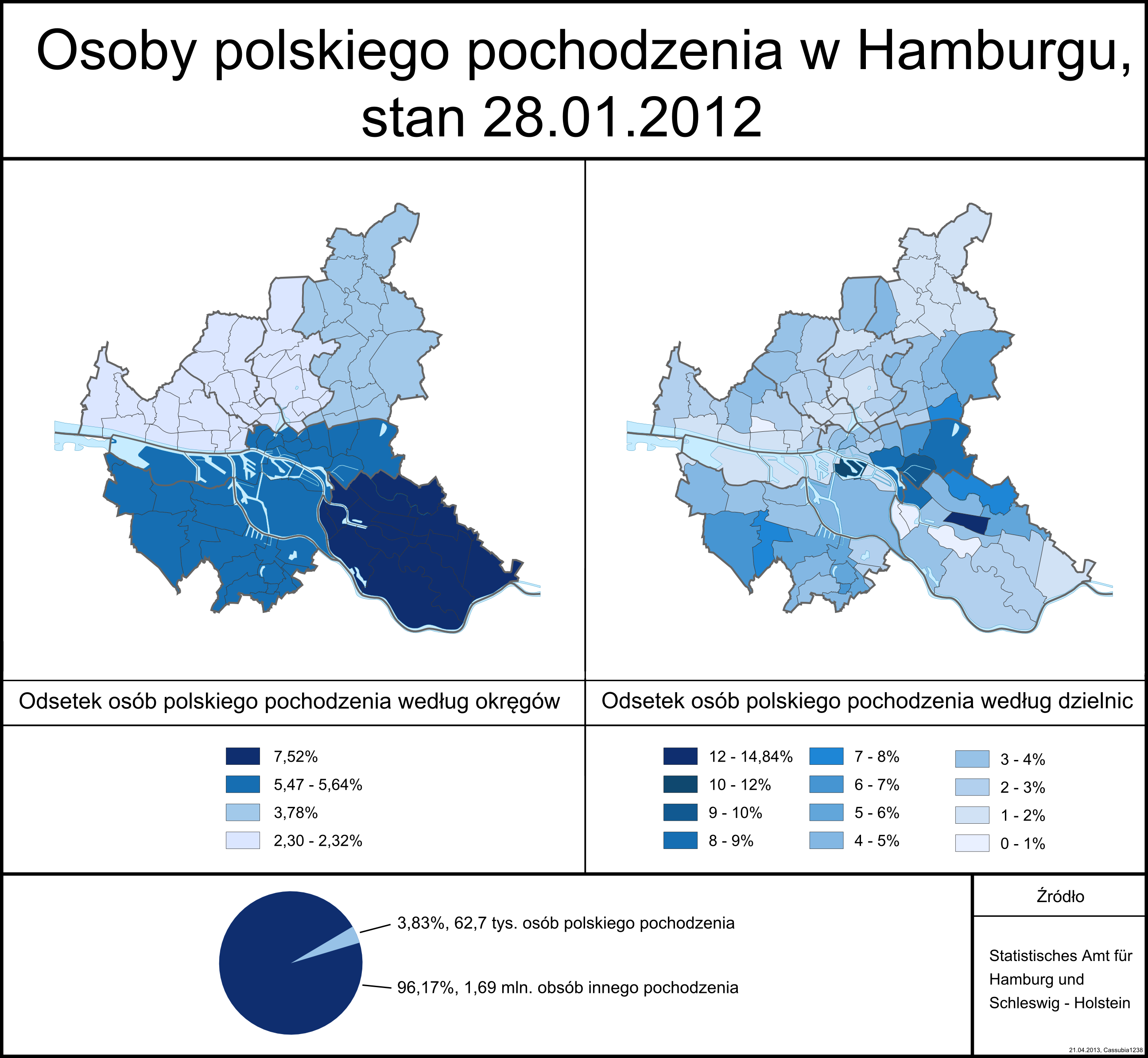
Map showing percentage of population who are of Polish origin in Hamburg

Data of 2011:

State	Number of Poles	% of State population	% of Poles in Germany
North Rhine-Westphalia	786,480	4.5	39.2
Bavaria	202,220	1.6	10.1
Baden-Württemberg	202,210	1.9	10.1
Lower Saxony	201,620	2.6	10.1
Hessen	163,200	2.7	8.1
Berlin	101,080	3.1	5.0
Rhineland-Palatinate	88,860	2.2	4.4
Hamburg	71,260	4.2	3.6
Schleswig-Holstein	55,510	2.0	2.8
Brandenburg	27,940	1.1	1.4
Bremen	26,270	4.0	1.3
Saxony	25,700	0.6	1.3
Saarland	19,870	2.0	1.0
Mecklenburg-Vorpommern	13,250	0.8	0.7
Saxony-Anhalt	10,790	0.5	0.5
Thuringia	10,140	0.5	0.5
Total	2,006,410	2.52	100.0

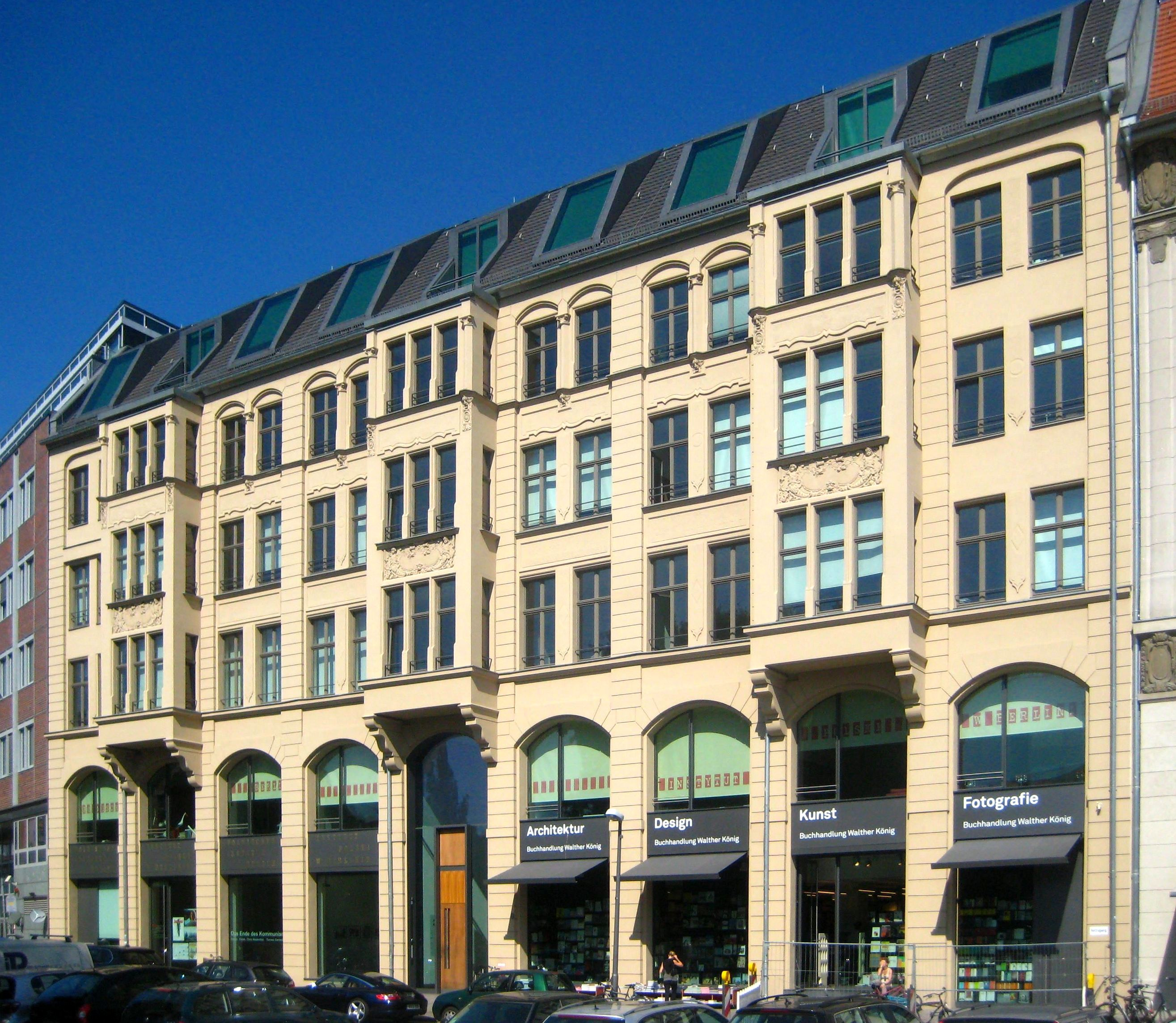
Polish Institute in Berlin

Number of Poles in larger cities
#	City	People
1.	Berlin	56,573
2.	Hamburg	23,310
3.	Munich	18,639
5.	Braunschweig	13,303
5.	Frankfurt	12,174
6.	Dortmund	10,138
7.	Cologne	9,766
8.	Bremen	9,455
9.	Düsseldorf	9,316
10.	Hanover	8,259
11.	Essen	6,952
12.	Bonn	6,879
13.	Nuremberg	6,670
14.	Mannheim	6,595
15.	Wuppertal	5,870
16.	Duisburg	5,423
17.	Leipzig	5,219
18.	Wiesbaden	4,648
19.	Gelsenkirchen	4,517
20.	Krefeld	4,473
21.	Offenbach	4,112

== Image gallery ==
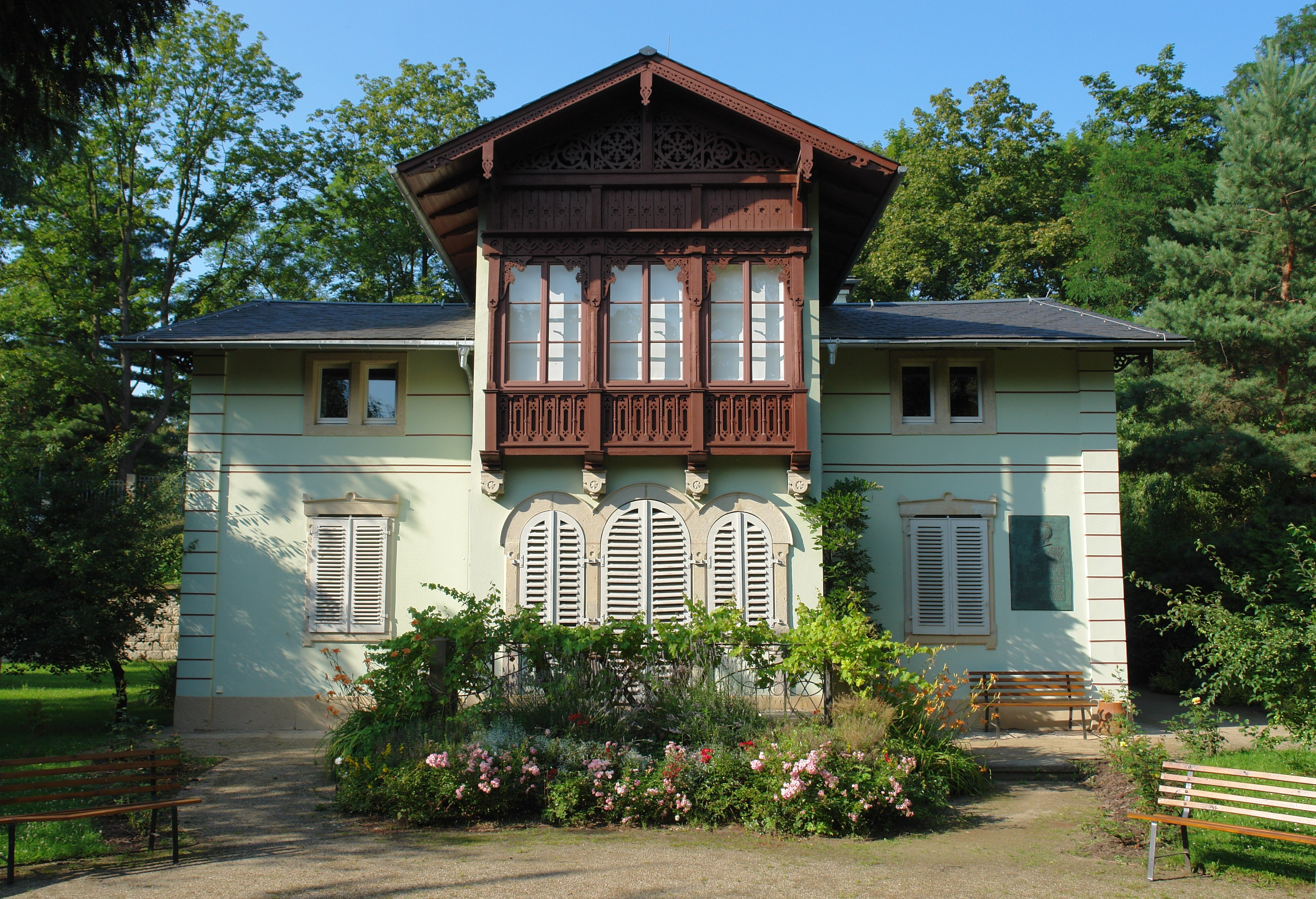
Kraszewski-Museum in Dresden

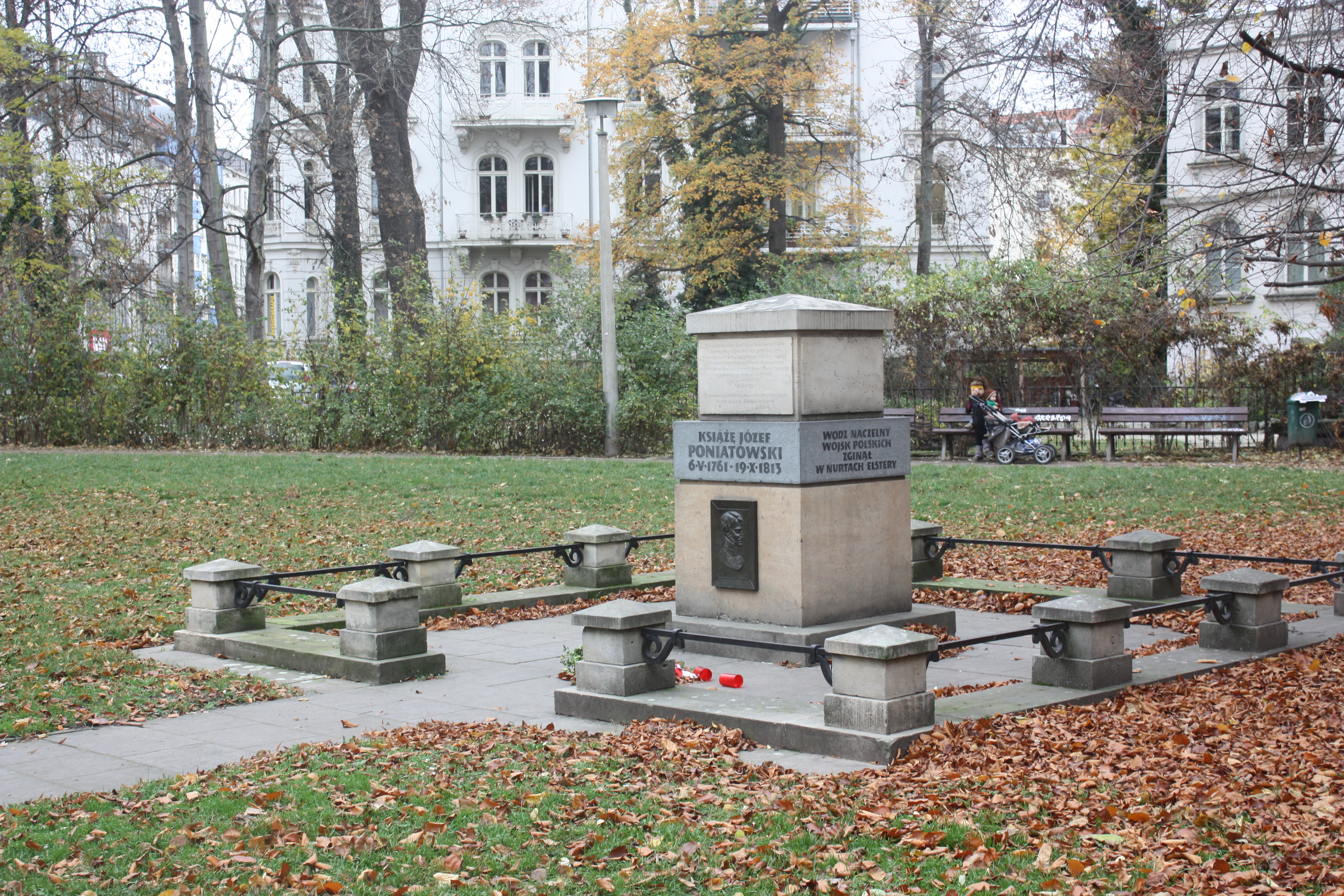
Józef Poniatowski memorial in Leipzig

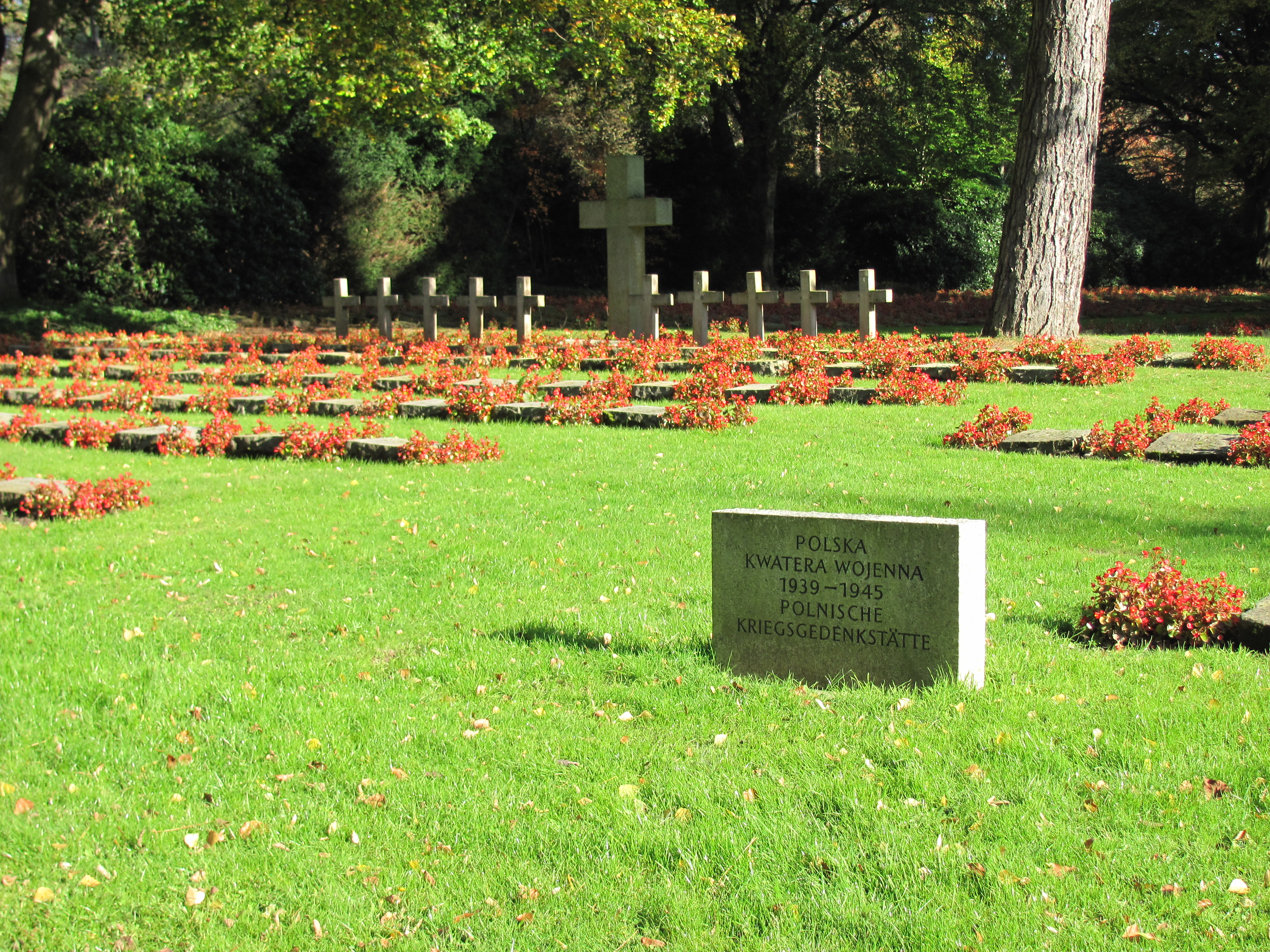
Polish Soldiers' Quarter of the Ohlsdorf Cemetery in Hamburg

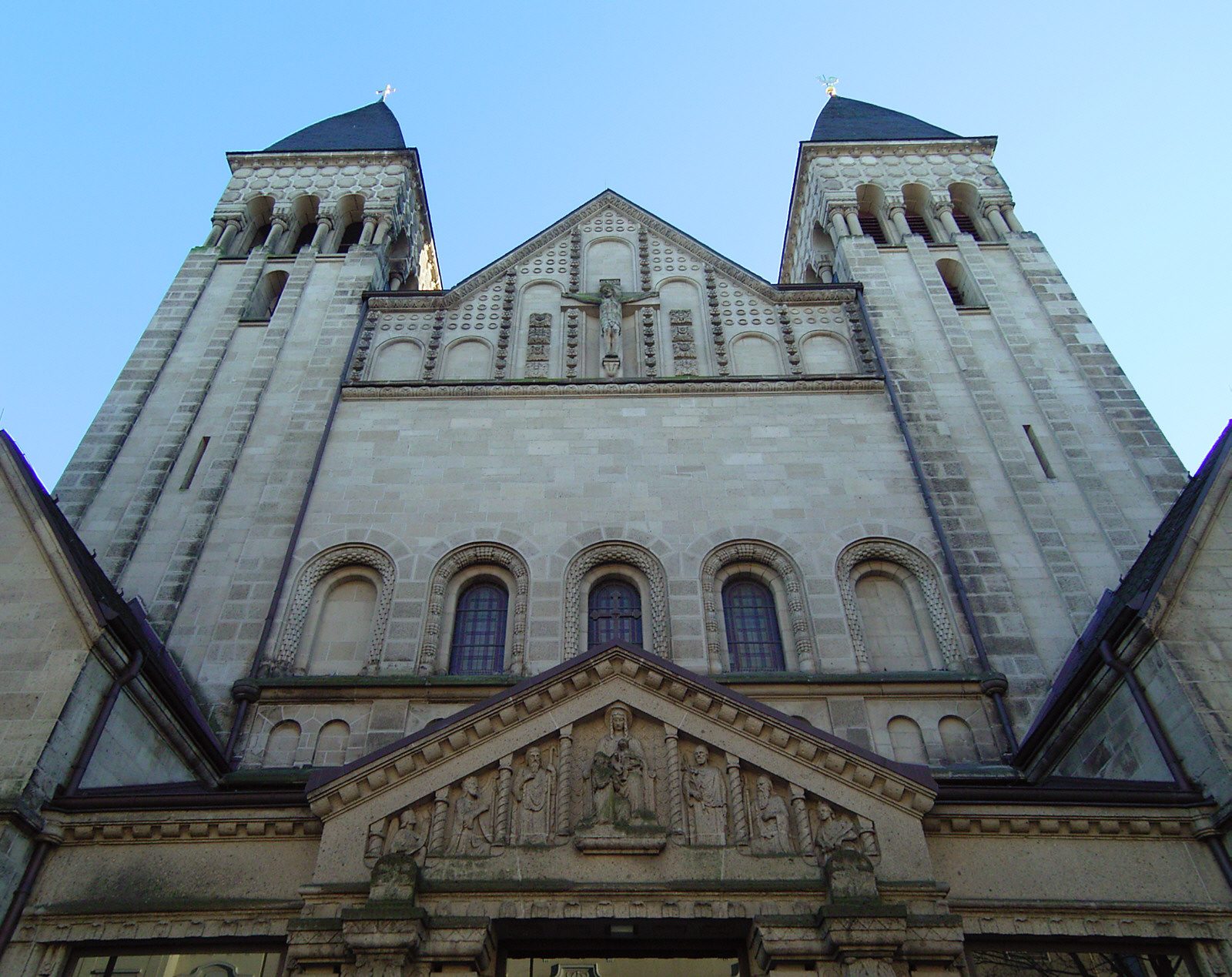
Saint Anne church of the Polish Catholic Mission in Dortmund

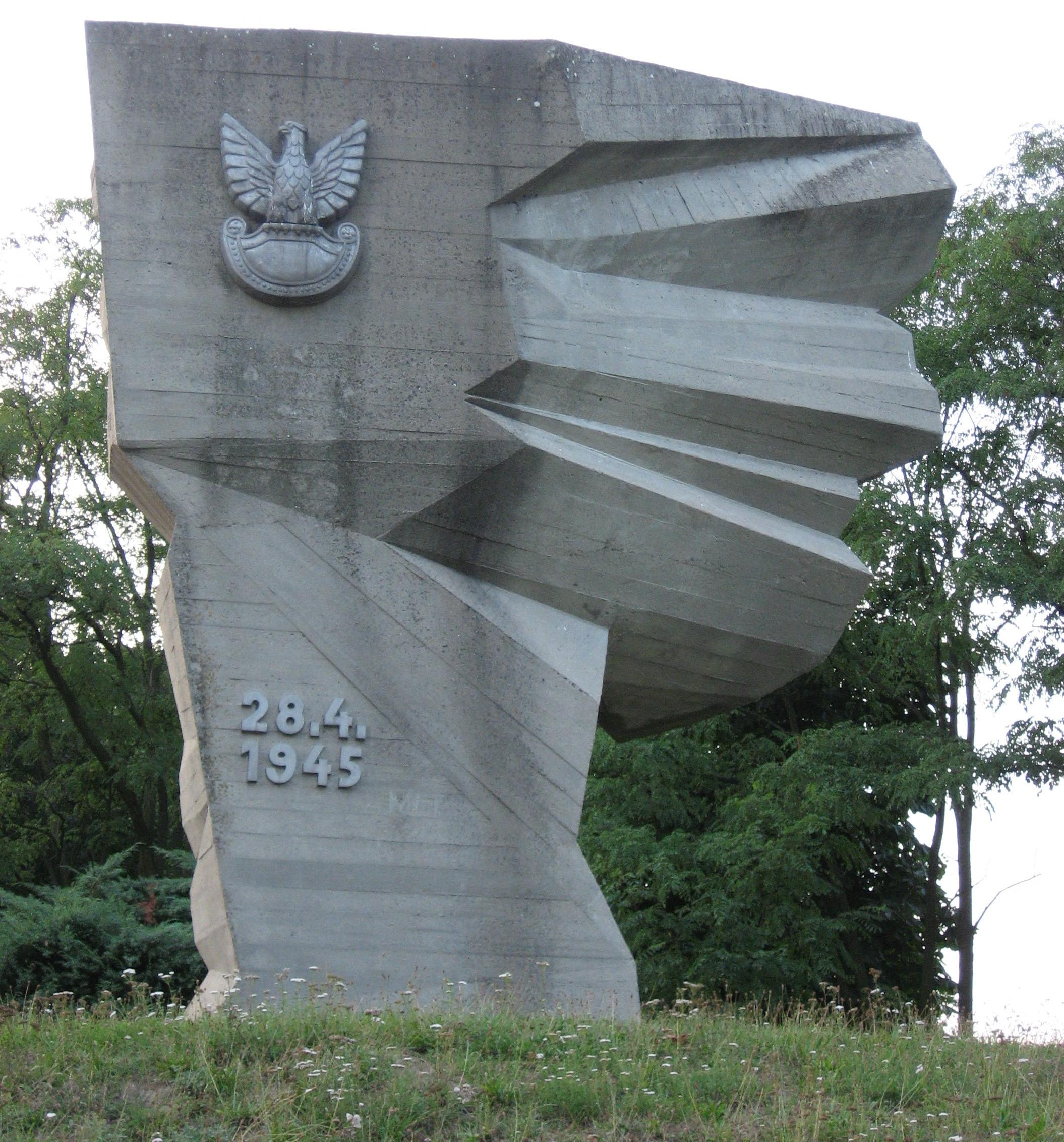
Monument to Polish soldiers in Crostwitz (Chrósćicy)

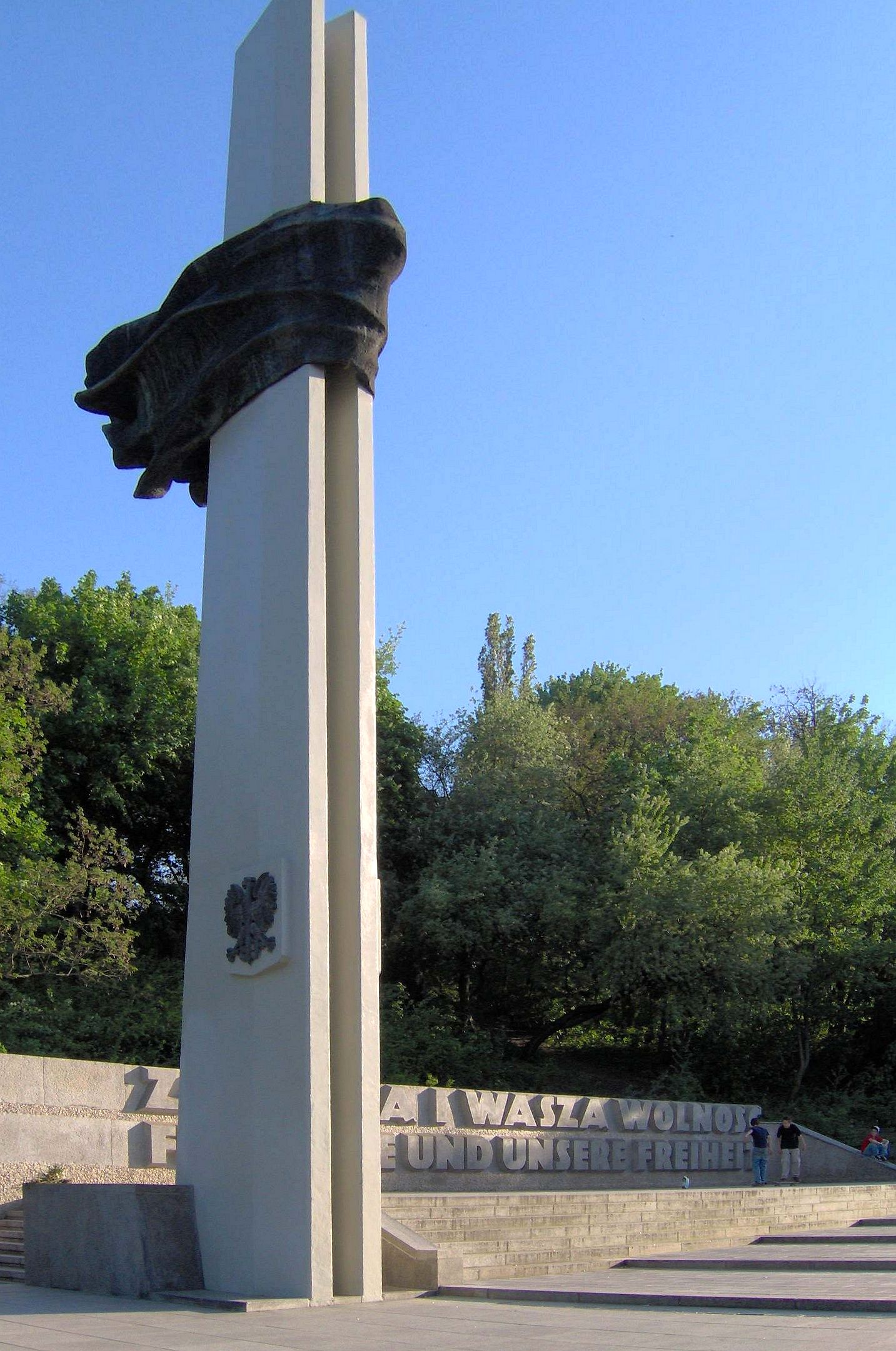
Memorial to Polish Soldiers and German Anti-Fascists in Berlin

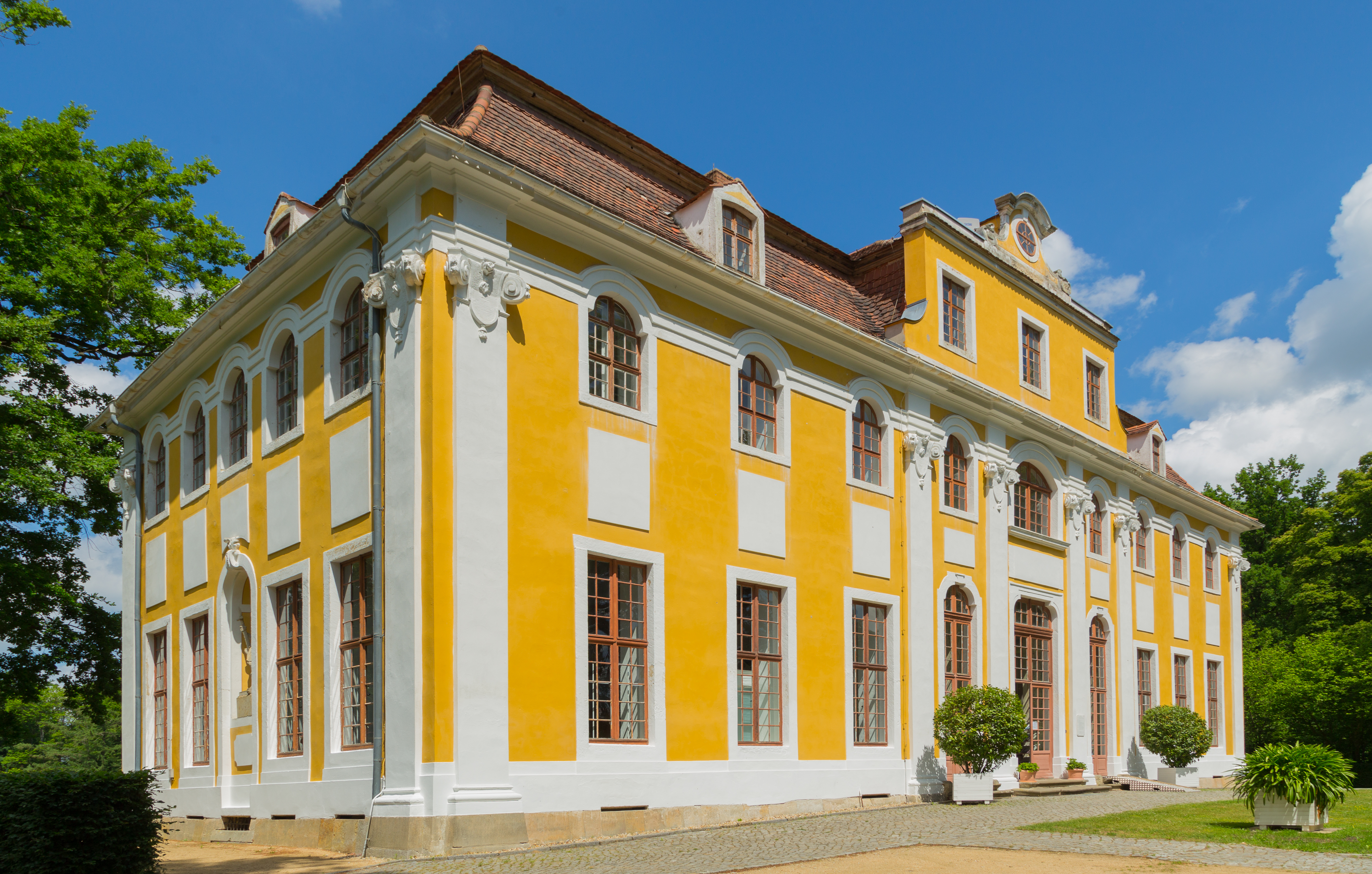
Baroque Palace of Aleksander Józef Sułkowski in Neschwitz (Upper Sorbian: Njeswačidło)

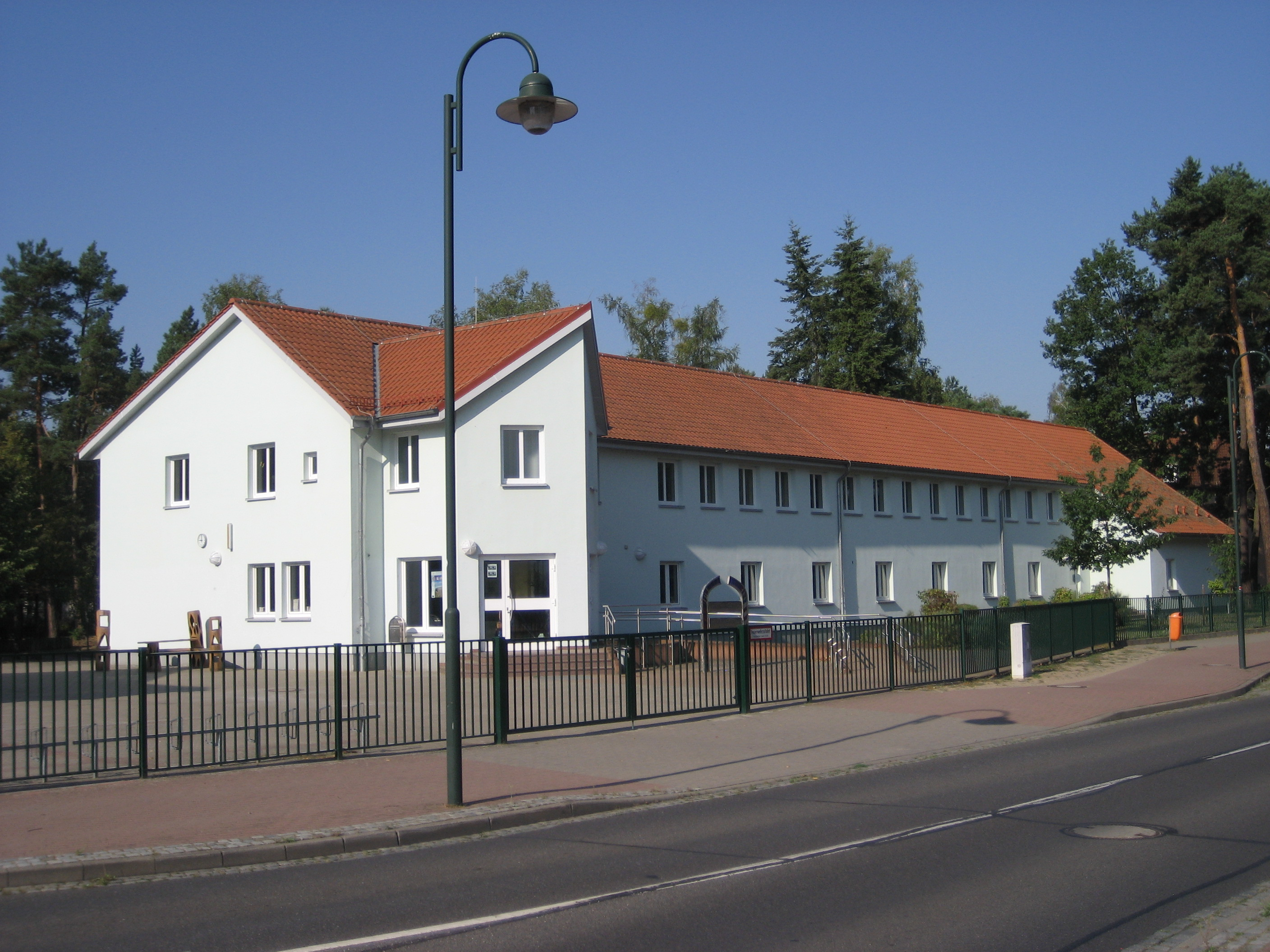
German-Polish Gymnasium and Lyceum in Löcknitz

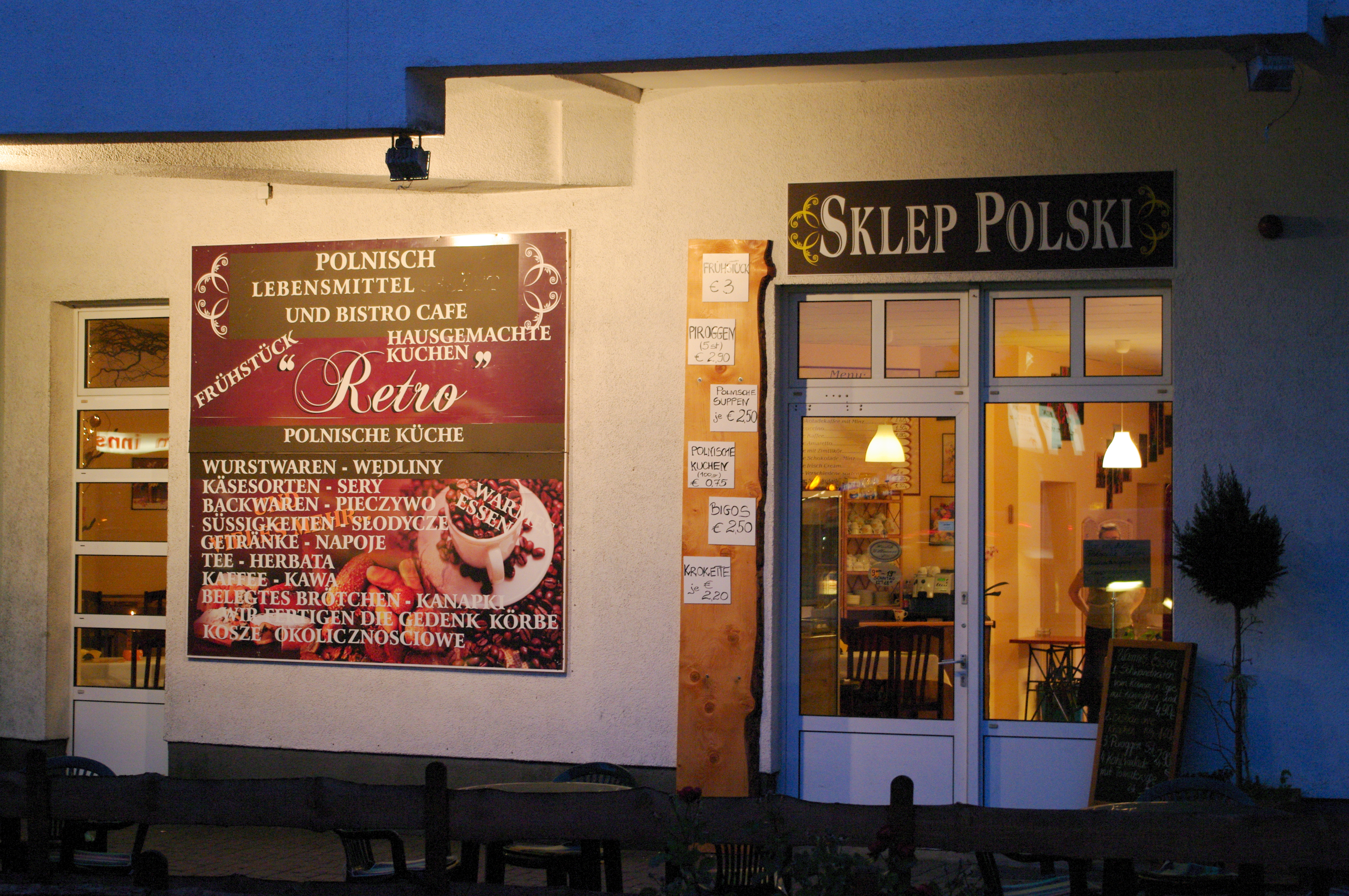
Polish Shop in Berlin

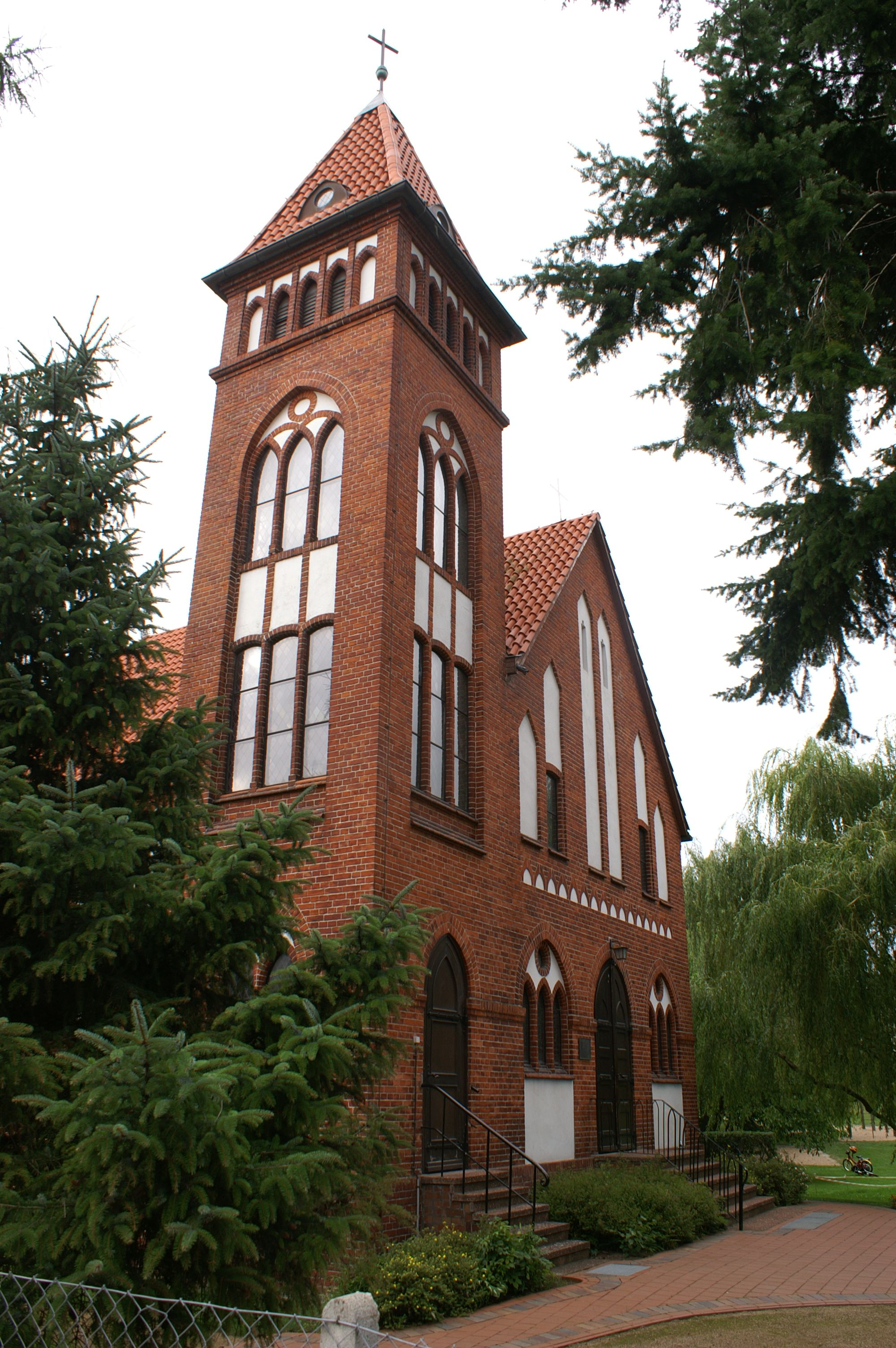
Former Polish Catholic church in Wolgast
Demolished palaces of Polish nobility

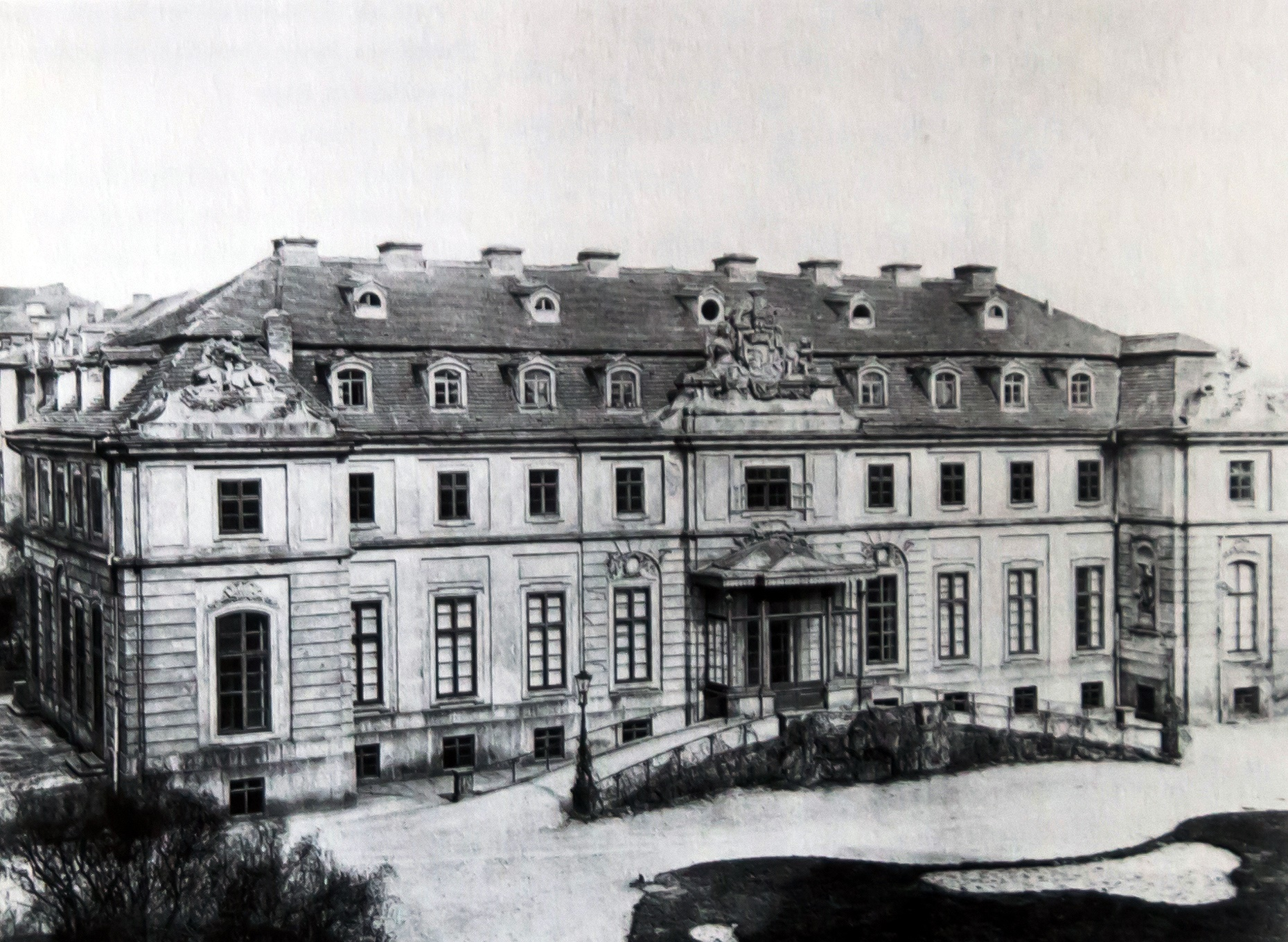
Moszyńska Palace in Dresden

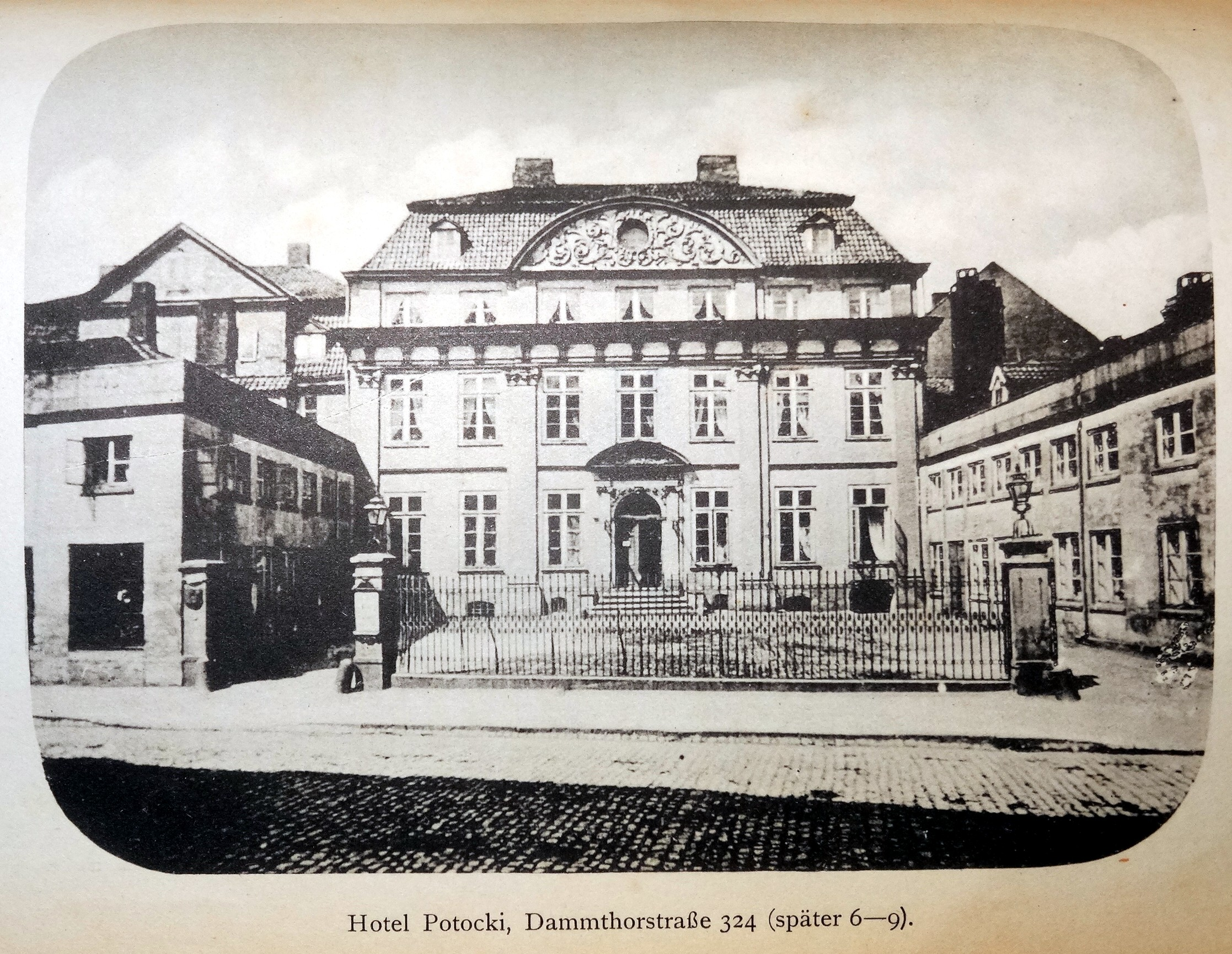
Potocki Palace in Hamburg

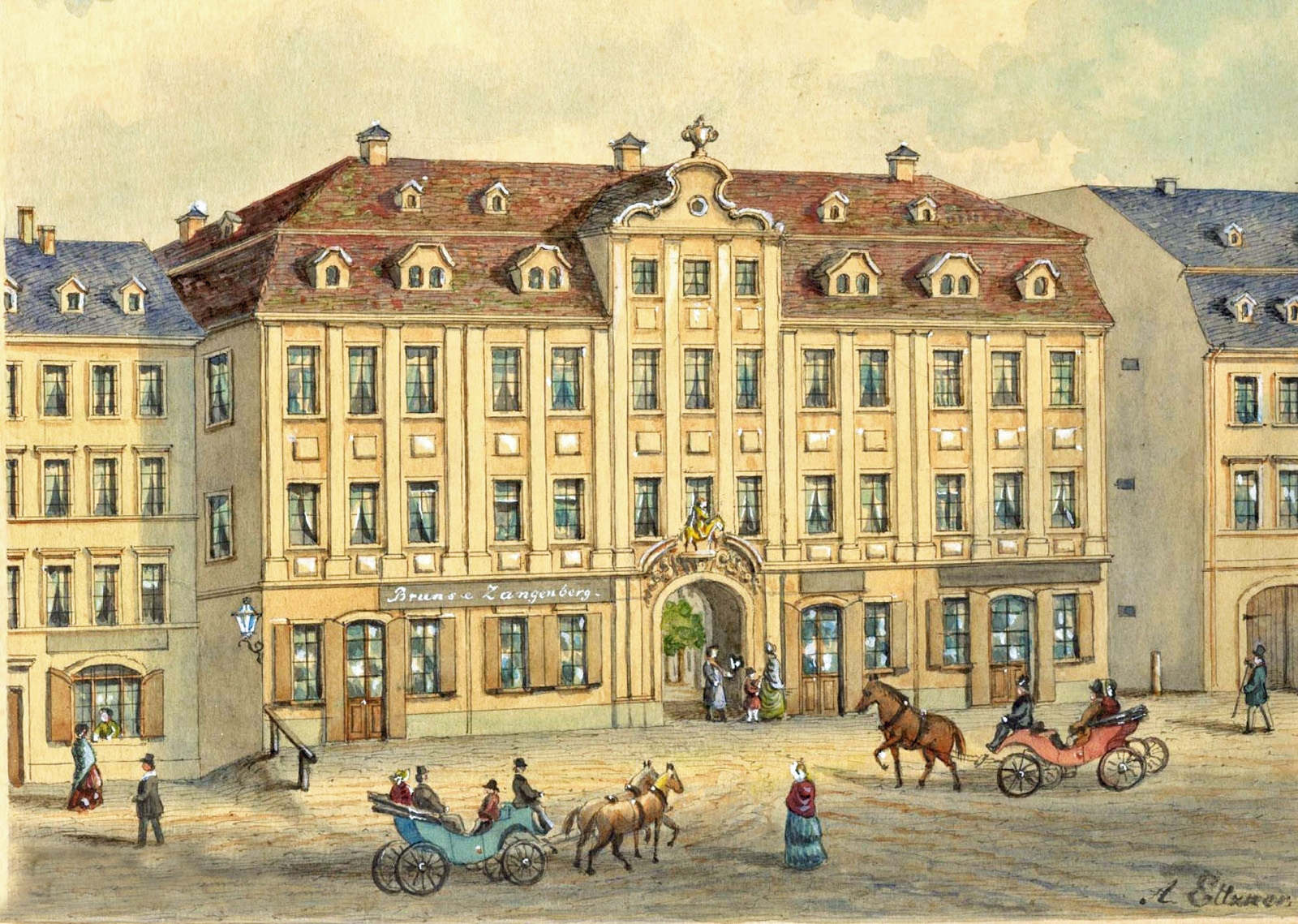
Jabłonowski Palace in Leipzig

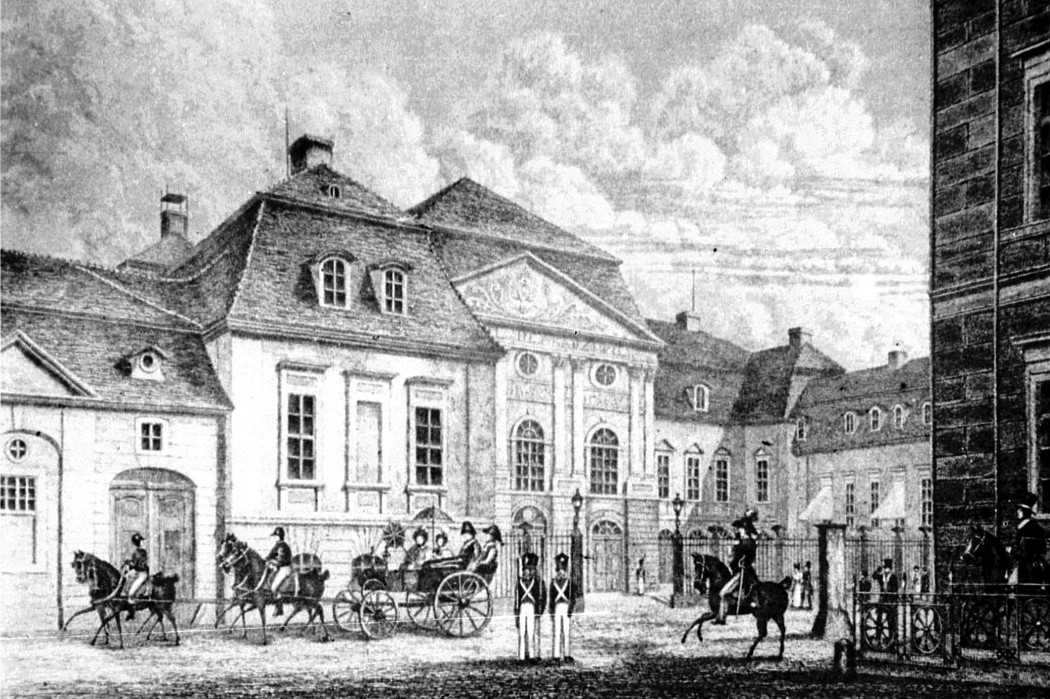
Radziwiłł Palace in Berlin

== Notable individuals ==
- Teresa Orlowski, performer in and a current producer of adult films in Germany
- Wilhelm Radziwiłł, Prussian general
- Elisa Radziwiłł, desired bride of Prince William of Prussia, who later became Wilhelm I, German Emperor
- Bogusław Fryderyk Radziwiłł, Prussian military officer and politician
- Antoni Wilhelm Radziwiłł, General of the Artillery in the Prussian Army
- Jörg Baberowski, historian
- Alfred von Niezychowski, count, a lieutenant commander of a German commerce raider ship during World War I, an author and lecturer,
- Max Skladanowsky - inventor and filmmaker
- Friedrich J. Grabowsky, biologist
- Johann Ernst Gotzkowsky, Prussian merchant with a successful trade in trinkets, silk, taft, porcelain, grain and bills of exchange
- Erich von dem Bach-Zelewski, high-ranking SS officer
- Konstanty Kapuścik - member of the Gestapo during World War II
- Joachim Mrugowsky, Nazi bacteriologist who committed medical atrocities at the Sachsenhausen concentration camp
- Erich Kempka, member of the SS in Nazi Germany who served as Adolf Hitler's primary chauffeur from 1936 to April 1945
- Daria Bijak, gymnast
- Władysław Kozakiewicz, athlete who specialised in the pole vault
- Jan Polack, 15th century painter
- Ludwik Marian Kaźmierczak, soldier and policeman who worked for the Berlin Police
- Horst Kaźmierczak, Protestant theologian
- Dirk Nowitzki, basketball player
- Sebastian Boenisch, footballer
- Tim Borowski, footballer
- Henryk M. Broder, journalist and writer
- Magdalena Brzeska, individual rhythmic gymnast
- Claudia Ciesla, model and actress
- Mascha Gonska, actress
- Karin Hanczewski, actress
- Karl Trabalski, politician and former Member of Parliament (Social Democratic Party, SPD)
- Herbert Czaja, politician
- Mario Czaja, politician
- Sebastian Czaja, politician
- Paul Ziemiak, politician of the Christian Democratic Union of Germany (CDU) who has been serving as a member of the German Bundestag since the 2017 federal election
- Stanislaw Trabalski, politician (SPD, USPD, SED)
- Wladislaw Taczanowski, elected member of the German Reichstag in Berlin from March 1871 to January 1877 as a representative of the Polenpartei ("Polish Party")
- Katharina Nocun, politician and author who, from May 2013 to October 2016, has been the policy coordinator of the Pirate Party of Germany
- Georg Pazderski, military officer and politician for the Alternative for Germany (AfD) party
- Nyke Slawik, politician and member of the Bundestag representing the German state of North Rhine-Westphalia on the Alliance 90/The Greens list
- Christoph Dabrowski, footballer
- Pamela Dutkiewicz, athlete specializing in hurdling
- Mark Forster, singer
- Paul Freier, footballer
- Anni Friesinger-Postma, speed skater
- Mieczysław Garsztka, pilot and flying ace during WWI
- Leon Goretzka, footballer
- Jürgen Grabowski, footballer
- Tatjana Maria, tennis player
- Horst Jankowski, musician
- Daniel Jasinski, discus thrower
- Maximilian Kepler-Różycki, baseball player
- Angelique Kerber, tennis player
- Nastassja Kinski, actress
- Miroslav Klose, footballer
- Joachim Król, actor
- Jutta Wachowiak, actress
- Arno Wyzniewski, actor
- Sabine Lisicki, tennis player
- Pierre Littbarski, football manager and player
- Tatjana Maria, tennis player
- Angela Merkel, Chancellor of Germany
- Adam Matuszczyk, footballer
- Dariusz Michalczewski, boxer
- Jerzy Montag, Green Party politician
- Hermann von Oppeln-Bronikowski, Olympic esquestrian and general during WWII
- Matthias Ostrzolek, footballer
- Michael Olczyk, footballer
- Matthias Plachta, ice hockey player
- Lukas Podolski, footballer
- Sebastian Piotrowski, footballer
- Ernst Pohl, footballer
- Michael Oscislawski, footballer
- Eugen Polanski, footballer
- Nico Patschinski, footballer
- Silas Ostrzinski, footballer
- Connor Krempicki, footballer
- Erich Przywara, philosopher
- Otto Przywara, swimmer
- Marcel Reich-Ranicki, literary critic
- Julian Ritter (Julian Stawski), painter
- Anna Dorothea Therbusch (Anna Dorothea Lisiewski), prominent Rococo painter born in the Kingdom of Prussia
- Lukas Sinkiewicz, footballer
- Piotr Trochowski, footballer
- Steven Skrzybski, footballer
- Robert Wulnikowski, footballer
- Martin Kobylański, footballer
- Hans Tilkowski, footballer
- Stanislaus Kobierski, footballer
- Bogdan Wenta, handball player and coach, president of Kielce
- Dennis Wosik, kickboxer
- Dariusz Wosz, footballer
- Joscha Wosz, footballer
- Denis Thomalla, footballer
- Paweł Thomik, footballer
- Tanja Pawollek, footballer
- Kempes Tekiela, footballer
- Bartosz Broniszewski, footballer
- Michael Gardawski, footballer
- Florian Schikowski, footballer
- Patrick Schikowski, footballer
- Michel Lewandowski, footballer
- Joachim Philipkowski, footballer
- Maik Nawrocki, footballer
- Daniel Mikołajewski (footballer, born 2006)
- Edmund Adamkiewicz, footballer
- Markus Brzenska - footballer
- Marcus Piossek - footballer
- Raphael Koczor - footballer
- Maik Łukowicz - footballer
- Patrick Choroba - footballer
- Marcel Lotka - footballer
- Janosch Dziwior - footballer
- Adam Cichon - footballer
- Thomas Cichon - footballer
- Sebastian Mrowca - footballer
- Daniel Ginczek - footballer
- Paul Grischok - footballer
- Kevin Pytlik - footballer
- Peter Schyrba - footballer
- Jona Niemiec - footballer
- Robert Niestroj - footballer
- Thomas Sobotzik - footballer
- Darius Kampa - footballer
- Rafael Kazior - footballer
- Michael Kutzop - footballer
- Ignace Kowalczyk - footballer
- Marlena Kowalik - footballer
- David Kopacz - footballer
- Mathias Wittek (Maciej Witek) - footballer
- David Zajas - footballer
- Sofie Zdebel - footballer
- Tomasz Zdebel - footballer
- Maciej Zięba - footballer
- Marcel Zylla - footballer
- Adrian Stanilewicz - footballer
- Kacper Koscierski - footballer
- Silvana Chojnowski - footballer
- Louis Poznański - footballer
- Dennis Jastrzembski - footballer
- Michael Kokocinski - footballer
- César Povolny - footballer
- Adrian Spyrka - footballer
- Martin Trocha - footballer
- Marvin Wanitzek - footballer
- Martin Smolinski - motorcycle speedway rider
- Benjamin Bilski - swimmer
- Percy Borucki - fencer
- Alice Bota - journalist
- Jan Choinski - tennis player
- Claudia Cislek - singer
- Holger Czukay - musician
- Wojtek Czyz - badminton player
- Johanna Goliszewski - badminton player
- Elise Saborovsky Ewert - Communist activist
- Ania Fucz - female kickboxer and mixed martial artist
- Bartosch Gaul - football manager who is currently the manager of J1 League club Sanfrecce Hiroshima
- Jacek Huchwajda - fencer
- Anna Jasińska - activist
- Klaus Kinski - actor
- Pola Kinski - actress
- Andreas Wisniewski - actor
- Kevin Ratajczak - singer
- Noemi Peschel - rhythmic gymnast
- Paulina Paszek - sprint canoeist
- Justine Ozga - tennis player
- Bolesław Napierała - cycling champion, twice winner of the Tour de Pologne
- Julian Musiol - ski jumper
- Bogdan Musioł - bobsledder
- Mona Mur - vocalist, composer and audio designer
- Paul Mross(Paweł Mróz) - chess master
- Kevin Mirocha - racing driwer
- Kinga Maculewicz-De La Fuente - volleyball player
- Karina Krawczyk - actress
- Margareta Kozuch - volleyball player
- Michael Wendler (Michael Skowronek) - pop schlager singer, television personality and conspiracy theorist
- Maria Emilie Anna von Mikulicz-Radecki - ornithologist known for her work with Neotropical bird species
- Juliane Koepcke - mammalogist who specialises in bats
- Olivia Luczak - female amateur boxer
- Margarete Stokowski - writer
- Martyna Trajdos - judoka
- Denis Wosik - kickboxer
- Krystian Trochowski - international rugby union player
- Frederik Tylicki - flat racing jockey
- Tomasz Wylenzek - sprint canoeist who has competed since the early 2000s
- Konrad Wysocki - basketball player
- David Zawada - mixed martial artist

== See also ==
- Germany–Poland relations
- German minority in Poland
- Union of Poles in Germany
- List of notable Germans of Polish origin
- Association of National Minorities in Germany
