= Broniszewski =

Broniszewski (feminine Broniszewska) is a Polish surname. Notable people with the surname include:

- Bartosz Broniszewski (born 1988), Polish-German former footballer
- Michał Broniszewski (born 1972), Polish former racing driver
- Mieczysław Broniszewski (born 1948), Polish former football manager
