= Association of National Minorities in Germany =

The Association of National Minorities in Germany (German: Verband der nationalen Minderheiten in Deutschland) was an umbrella organization and pressure group created in 1924 at the initiative of the Union of Poles in Germany which aimed at representing the interests of the Polish, Danish, Sorbian, Frisian and Lithuanian minorities in the German Weimar Republic. It was dissolved by the Nazi regime in 1939.

In the Prussian Landtag, the Polish List had already got two mandates at the 1922 elections, Johann Baczewski and Josef Wajda (who died in 1923 and was replaced by Stanislaus Graf von Sierakowski). At the following 1925 elections, the Polish List was supported by the Association of National Minorities but it did not get more seats, Johann Baczewski was reelected and Ceslau Klimas also made his entry to the Landtag.

The Sorb Jan Skala, a founding member of the Lausitzer Volkspartei in 1919 and since 1925 an employee of the Union of Poles in Germany, was the editor in chief of the Association of National Minorities' magazine, Kulturwille (1925-1926), later renamed Kulturwehr till its closure by the Nazi regime in 1936.

== See also ==
- Polish minority in Germany and Union of Poles in Germany
