= List of Germans of Polish origin =

List of notable German citizens of Polish origin.

- Jörg Baberowski, historian
- Erich von dem Bach-Zelewski, high-ranking SS officer
- Daria Bijak, gymnast
- Sebastian Boenisch, footballer
- Henryk M. Broder, journalist and writer
- Magdalena Brzeska, individual rhythmic gymnast
- Claudia Ciesla, model and actress
- Herbert Czaja, politician
- Christoph Dabrowski, footballer
- Pamela Dutkiewicz, athlete specializing in hurdling
- Mark Forster, singer
- Paul Freier, footballer
- Anni Friesinger-Postma, speed skater
- Mieczysław Garsztka, pilot and flying ace during WWI
- Leon Goretzka, footballer
- Jürgen Grabowski, footballer
- Horst Jankowski, musician
- Daniel Jasinski, discus thrower
- Max Kepler, baseball player
- Angelique Kerber, tennis player
- Nastassja Kinski, actress
- Miroslav Klose, footballer
- Joachim Król, actor
- Sabine Lisicki, tennis player
- Pierre Littbarski, football manager and player
- Tatjana Maria, tennis player
- Angela Merkel, Chancellor of Germany
- Adam Matuszczyk, footballer
- Dariusz Michalczewski, boxer
- Jerzy Montag, Green Party politician
- Hermann von Oppeln-Bronikowski, Olympic esquestrian and general during WWII
- Matthias Ostrzolek, footballer
- Matthias Plachta, ice hockey player
- Lukas Podolski, footballer
- Ernst Pohl, footballer
- Eugen Polanski, footballer
- Mateusz Przybylko, high jumper
- Erich Przywara, philosopher
- Marcel Reich-Ranicki, literary critic
- Julian Ritter, painter
- Lukas Sinkiewicz, footballer
- Piotr Trochowski, footballer
- Bogdan Wenta, handball player and coach, president of Kielce
- Dennis Wosik, kickboxer
- Dariusz Wosz, footballer.

== See also ==
- Poles in Germany
- Emigration from Poland to Germany after World War II
