= Union of Poles in Germany =

Organization representing Poles in Germany

- Związek Polaków w Niemczech
- The Rodło Symbol
- Formation: August 27, 1922; 104 years ago
- Founded at: Berlin, Weimar Republic
- Dissolved: February 27, 1940; 86 years ago (reactivated: 1945)
- Type: NGO
- Headquarters: Breite Straße 66
- Location: Mönchengladbach, Germany
- Region served: Germany
- Official language: Polish
- President: Józef Hilarius Malinowski
- Vice–President: Anna Wawrzyszko
- Secretary: Maciej Budniewski,
- Chairman: Edward Kieyne
- Publication: Polak w Niemczech
- Affiliations: FUEN; Związek Obrony Kresów Zachodnich; Polski Związek Zachodni
- Website: zpwn.org

Union of Poles in Germany (Polish: Związek Polaków w Niemczech, German: Bund der Polen in Deutschland e.V.) is an organisation of the Polish minority in Germany, founded in 1922. In 1924, the union initiated collaboration between other minorities, including Sorbs, Danes, Frisians and Lithuanians, under the umbrella organization Association of National Minorities in Germany. From 1939 until 1945 the Union was outlawed in Nazi Germany. After 1945 it had lost some of its influence; in 1950 the Union of Poles in Germany split into two organizations: the Union of Poles in Germany (German: Bund der Polen in Deutschland e.V.), which refused to recognize the communist Polish government of the Polish United Workers' Party, and the Union of Poles "Zgoda" (Unity) (German: Bund der Polen "Zgoda" (Eintracht)), which recognized the new communist government in Warsaw and had contacts with it. The split was healed in 1991. The organization is a member of the Federal Union of European Nationalities.

== Early history ==
Rodło with lime leaf - badge of Polish youth in Germany

The union was intended to express the views of the Polish minority in Germany, This partly comprised the Polish-native population of the former East German provinces which remained with Germany under the conditions of the Treaty of Versailles (Upper Silesia, East Brandenburg, Pomerania, Warmia) or areas where Poles settled in Middle Ages (southern areas of East Prussia) — mostly farmers and workers — and partly the Polish immigrants in Ruhr area (see Ruhr Poles). This constituency of the Union was calculated to number approximately 1,500,000 people. Official German statistics from the mid-1920s showed approximately 200,000 persons with Polish mother tongue. Polish political parties gained between 33,000 and 101,000 votes in the legislative elections in the Weimar Republic between 1919 and 1932. However, the Polish minority was only legally recognised as such in Upper Silesia, where they possessed international status due to Treaty of Versailles. In other areas Poles had no special minority rights.

In February 1933 the Union created a central financial institution, "Bank Słowiański" (The Slavic Bank), with a professional and technical staff. This institution was one of many Polish financial and economic organisations in Germany, such as: banks of peasant farmers, cooperatives, agricultural circles and savings banks. Up to 1931, twenty-one Polish credit banks acted in Germany.

In Nazi Germany Poles faced increased problems, as the Nazis attempted to force cultural unity on the country. Poles outside of the Upper Silesia, such as Lower Silesia, were forced to declare German nationality; activists of the union were subject to persecutions. However, the union was kept legal in the hope of avoiding escalations of ethnic conflict that would create problems for the German minority in Poland (mostly in the autonomous Silesian Voivodeship, in Wielkopolska and the then Pomeranian Voivodeship, comprising parts of former West Prussia in the Polish Corridor, 1919–1939).

The leaders of the Union found it necessary to invent new symbols for the Union to avoid the possibility that Poles would adhere to the new “national” symbols, such as the Nazi salute and the swastika.

This led to invention of the symbol of the Union, the Rodło, a stylized representation of the Vistula river. The reason for its adoption was that the Polish national symbol, the White Eagle, was not allowed by Prussian law. The Nazi swastika provided a certain inspiration for the Poles own alternative symbol that was designed to be a challenge to Nazi Germany. It was created by the graphic designer Janina Kłopocka, who made a rough sketch of "the emblem of the Vistula river, cradle of the Polish people, and royal Kraków — the cradle of Polish culture". The white emblem was placed on a red background to emphasize the solidarity with the Polish nation and its soul.

== Structure and number of members ==
Originally, the Union, with headquarters in Berlin (until the outbreak of World War II), was divided into four districts. In October 1923 the District V was created, with capital in Złotów (German: Flatow). It covered the area of Grenzmark Posen-West Prussia. Also, the province of Lower Silesia was in 1928 added to District I. Union of Poles in Germany According to postwar estimates based on rescued archives, in mid-1924 Union of Poles in Germany had approximately 32 000 members in all districts:

- District I (Opole - Oppeln), which covered German part of Upper Silesia - 5 100 (16.5%) members in 104 branch,
- District II (Berlin), which covered Saxony, Brandenburg (incl. Neumark), Hamburg, Posen-West Prussia and Province of Pomerania - 6,200 members (20%) of the total,
- District III (Bochum), which covered Westfalia, Rhineland, Baden and Pfalz - 13 000 members in 160 branches 45% of the total,
- District IV (Olsztyn - Allenstein, East Prussia), which covered the Province of East Prussia - almost 4000 12.5%
- District V Złotów - Grenzmark Posen-West Prussia - 2700 members or close 6% of the total.

== World War II and after ==
Even before the German invasion of Poland, leading anti-Nazi members of the Polish minority were deported to concentration camps; some were executed at the Piaśnica murder site. The Union was outlawed by the Nazi government in August, 1939.

Members of the Polish minority who held German citizenship were subject to obligatory military service in the German regular Armed Forced; those who did not, were obliged to forced labor or emigration into the Government General of occupied Poland. In 1945, most of areas populated by the Polish minorities were located inside the new post-War Polish border, the Oder-Neisse line.

After the war, many members found it difficult to be recognised as ethnic Poles by the new Communist authorities, as some - like the Kashubians (grandfather of Donald Tusk is an example) - had served as "Germans" in the German Wehrmacht. Moreover, along with most Poles, they were unsympathetic to the Communist ideology of the new government. Unlike most of Polish society, the native Poles in former German territory sometimes had no experience of a Polish state concept, other than under Communism. Some of them, who had held German citizenship prior to 1945, emigrated en masse into West Germany subsequently, during the Communist regime in the People's Republic of Poland. (As did numerous Kashubians and nearly all Lutheran Protestant, pro-Prussian Masurians of southern East Prussia.)

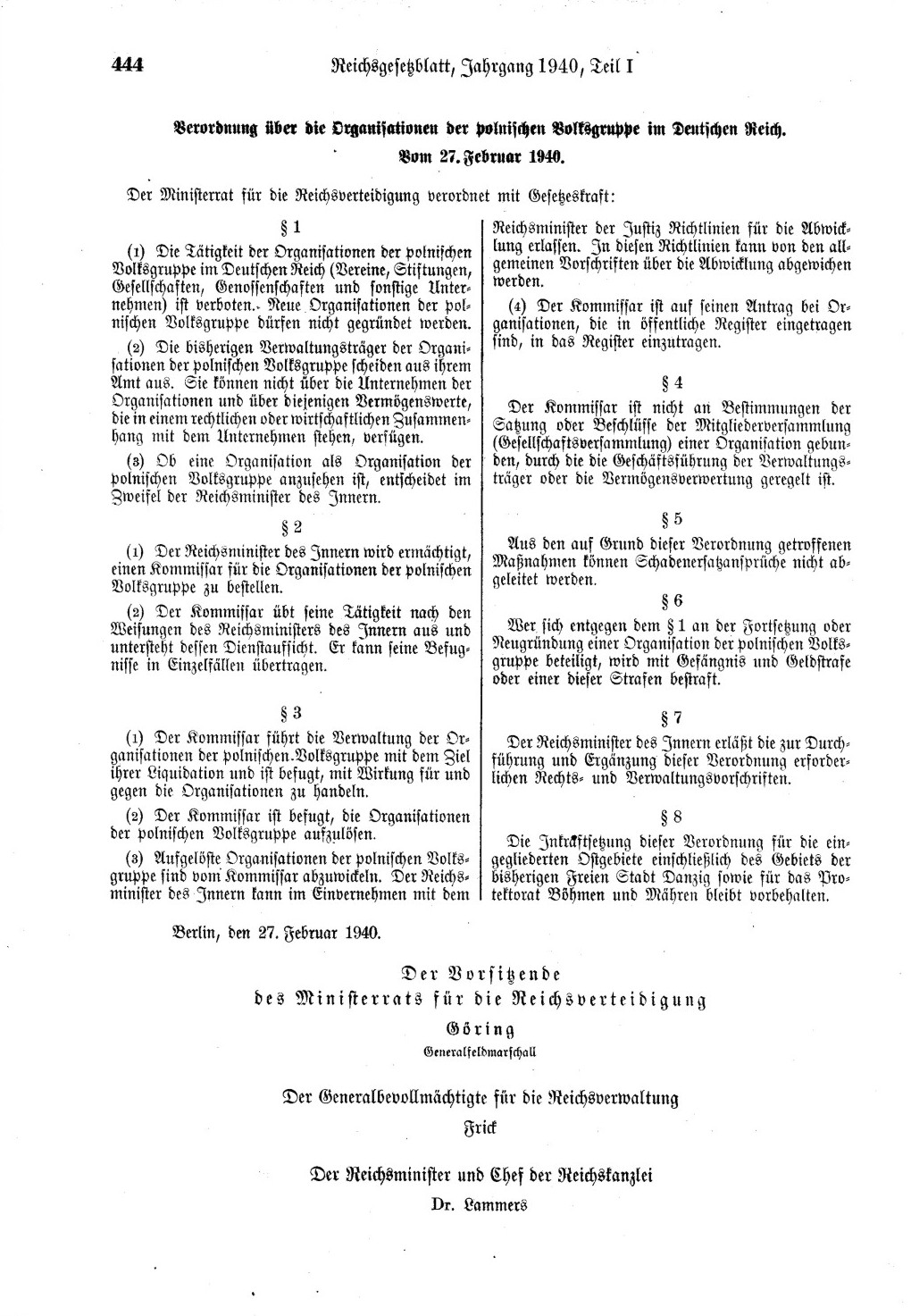
Law to make illegal Polish organisations in Germany.

== Timeline ==
- August 27, 1922: founded in Berlin
- 1933: adopted Rodło as symbol to challenge Nazis.
- March 6, 1938: The first congress in Berlin. Adopted 5 rules for Poles inside Germany.
- February 27, 1940: the union was made illegal by the Nazis and 1200 activists sent to concentration camps or prisons.
- 1945: reactivated.

== Presidents ==
- 1922–1931: Stanisław Sierakowski
- 1931–April 1939: Rev. Fr. Bolesław Domański
- April 1939 –September 1939: Stefan Szczepaniak
- 1950–1964: Stefan Szczepaniak
- 1964–1969: Józef Styp-Rekowski
- 1970–1988: E. Forycki
- 1988–1991: T. Wesołowski
- 1991–1993: S. Jabłoński
- 1993–1997: Tadeusz Hyb
- 1997–February 2004: Józef Młynarczyk
- February 2004–May 2009: Zdzisław Duda
- June 2009–February 2013: Marek Wójcicki
- since May 2013: Józef Malinowski

== Press ==
- "Dziennik Berliński", "Polak w Niemczech", "Mały Polak w Niemczech", "Gazeta Olsztyńska", "Mazur", "Głos Pogranicza i Kaszub", "Dziennik Raciborski", "Ogniwio" and other.

== See also ==
- Ruhrpolen
- History of Poles in Konigsberg

== Bibliography ==
- Blanke, Richard. Orphans of Versailles: The Germans in Western Poland, 1918-1939 (U Kentucky Press, 1993).
- Cyganski, Miroslaw. "Nazi Persecutions of Polish National Minorities in the Rhineland-Westphalia Provinces in the Years 1933-1945," Polish Western Affairs (1976) 17#12 pp 115–138
- Fink, Carole. " Stresemann's Minority Policies, 1924-29," Journal of Contemporary History (1979) 14#3 pp. 403–422 in JSTOR
- Sobczak, Janusz. "The Centenary Of Polish Emigration To Rhineland-Westphalia," Polish Western Affairs (1970) 11#1 pp 193–198.
- Wrzesihski, Wojciech. "The Union of Poles in Germany (1922-1939)," Polish Western Affairs, (1968) 9#1 pp. 19–43,
- Wrzesihski, Wojciech. "The Union of Poles in Germany and its Attitude to Problems of Consciousness of Nationality (1922-1939)," Acta Poloniae Historica, 20 (1969), pp.52–74; ISSN 0001-6829 (in English).
- Wynot, Edward D. "The Poles in Germany, 1919-139," East European Quarterly, 1996 30#2 pp 171+ online broad overview

=== In Polish or German ===
- (in Polish, English, and French) Helena Lehr, Edmund Osmańczyk "POLACY SPOD ZNAKU RODłA", MON 1972
- Edmund Osmańczyk "Wisła i Kraków to Rodło" Nasza Księgarnia Warszawa 1985 ISBN 83-10-08675-X
- W Wrzesiński, "Polski ruch narodowy w Niemczech w latach 1922-1939"; Ossolineum 1993
- T. Kaczmarek "Polen und Deutschland. Von Nachbarschaft zu Partnerschaft", Bogucki, 2006. ISBN 978-83-60247-61-7
