= Congress of Polonia in Germany =

Polish organization in Germany

The Congress of Polonia in Germany (Polish: Kongres Polonii Niemieckiej, German: Polnischer Kongress in Deutschland e.V.) is a national umbrella organisation, representing Poles in Germany.

== See also ==
- Polonia
