= Rodło =

Polish nationalist and anti-Nazi political symbol

- Rodło logotype
- Adopted: 1932
- Use: Official emblem of the Union of Poles in Germany

The Rodło is a Polish emblem used since 1932 by the Union of Poles in Germany. It is a stylized representation of the Vistula River and Kraków as the wellsprings of Polish culture.

== History ==
After Adolf Hitler had seized power in Germany, Nazi emblems were soon nationalized. The swastika became national emblem of the Third Reich and Poles from the Union of Poles in Germany could not use their national symbols anymore, because they were prohibited. Dr. Jan Kaczmarek approached the supreme council with the following proposal:

"Our acceptance of the swastika and the German greeting could only signify agreement to total germanisation. Therefore we must find a way, without risking the accusation of anti-state activity; of not accepting Heil Hitler and the swastika (...) we should at last have our own national symbol, which would, enable us publicity to set ourselves free from the Nazi swastika."

The Rodło was invented as a new symbol around which Poles in Germany could rally. The name "rodło" is a portmanteau of "ród" ("folk") and "godło" ("emblem").

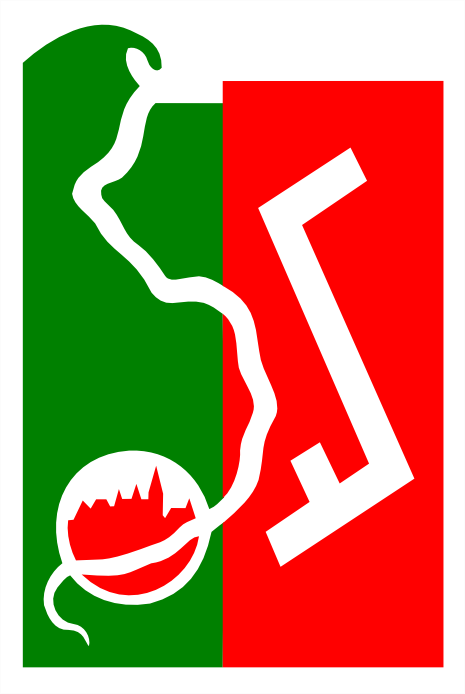
Graphic meaning of Rodło sign

The Rodło graphic was conceived in the 1930s by graphic designer Janina Kłopocka, who sketched the "emblem of the Vistula River, cradle of the Polish people, and royal Kraków, cradle of Polish culture". The white emblem was placed on a red background, the Polish national colors. It was adopted in August 1932 by the leadership of the Union of Poles in Germany.

== Other uses ==
Rodło with lime leaf – badge of Polish Scouts in Germany

The Rodło has since been adopted by other organizations of Poles in Germany, notably the Scouts, who have used it alongside the fleur de lys. After the World War II it was also used by organizations working in Poland, on the territories gained from Germany as the result of war.

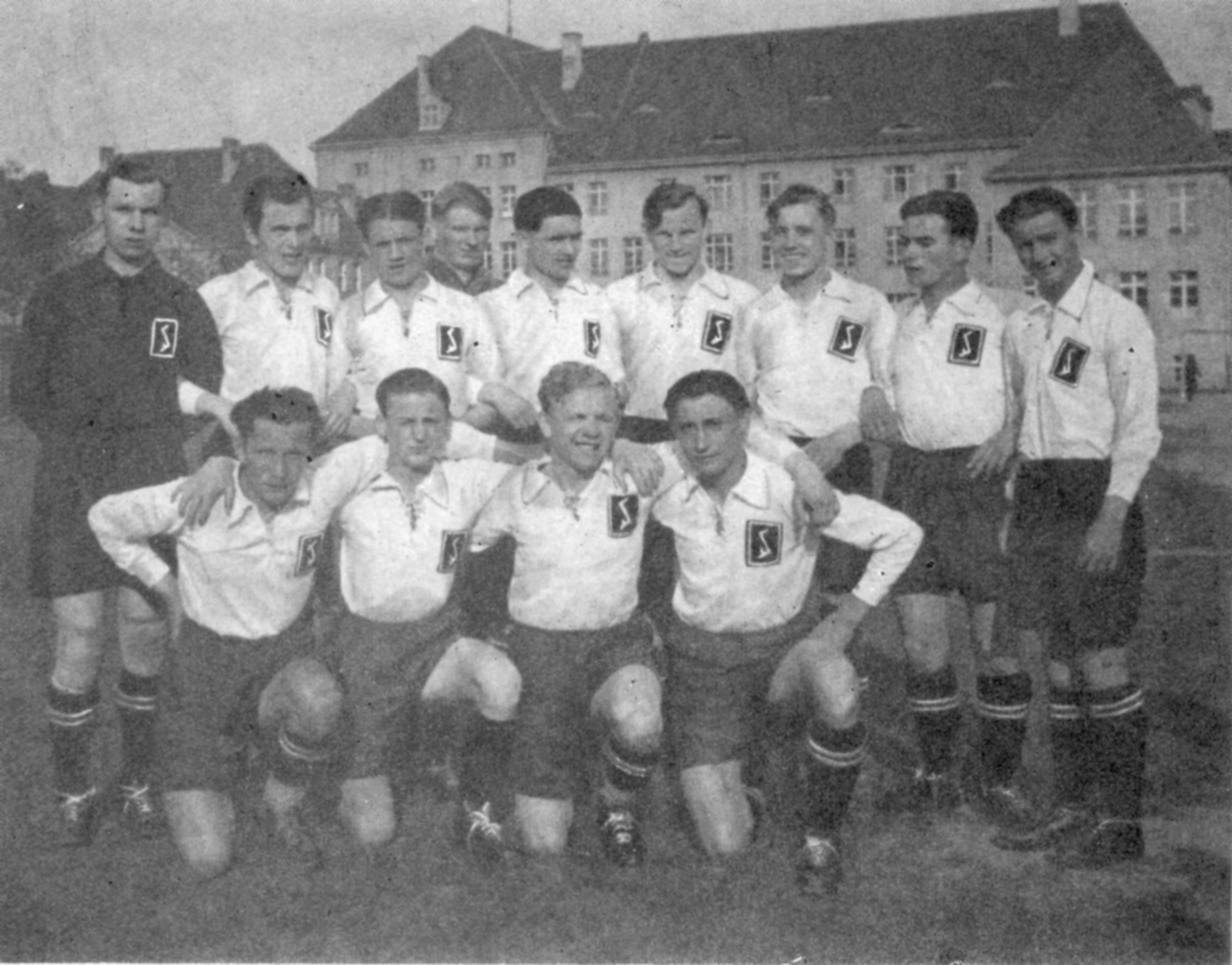
The Union of Poles in Germany football team, with the Rodło displayed prominently on their chests, at the World Polonia Games, 1934

Various Polish football clubs have been named after the Rodło or have utilised it in their club’s badge, such as the formerly East Prussian club Rodło Trzciano. The Lower Silesian club Rodło Granowice, Pomeranian side Rodło Kwidzyn, and Upper Silesian team Rodło Górniki were all formed in 1946. In 1996 another club from the latter region Rodło Opole, was formed.

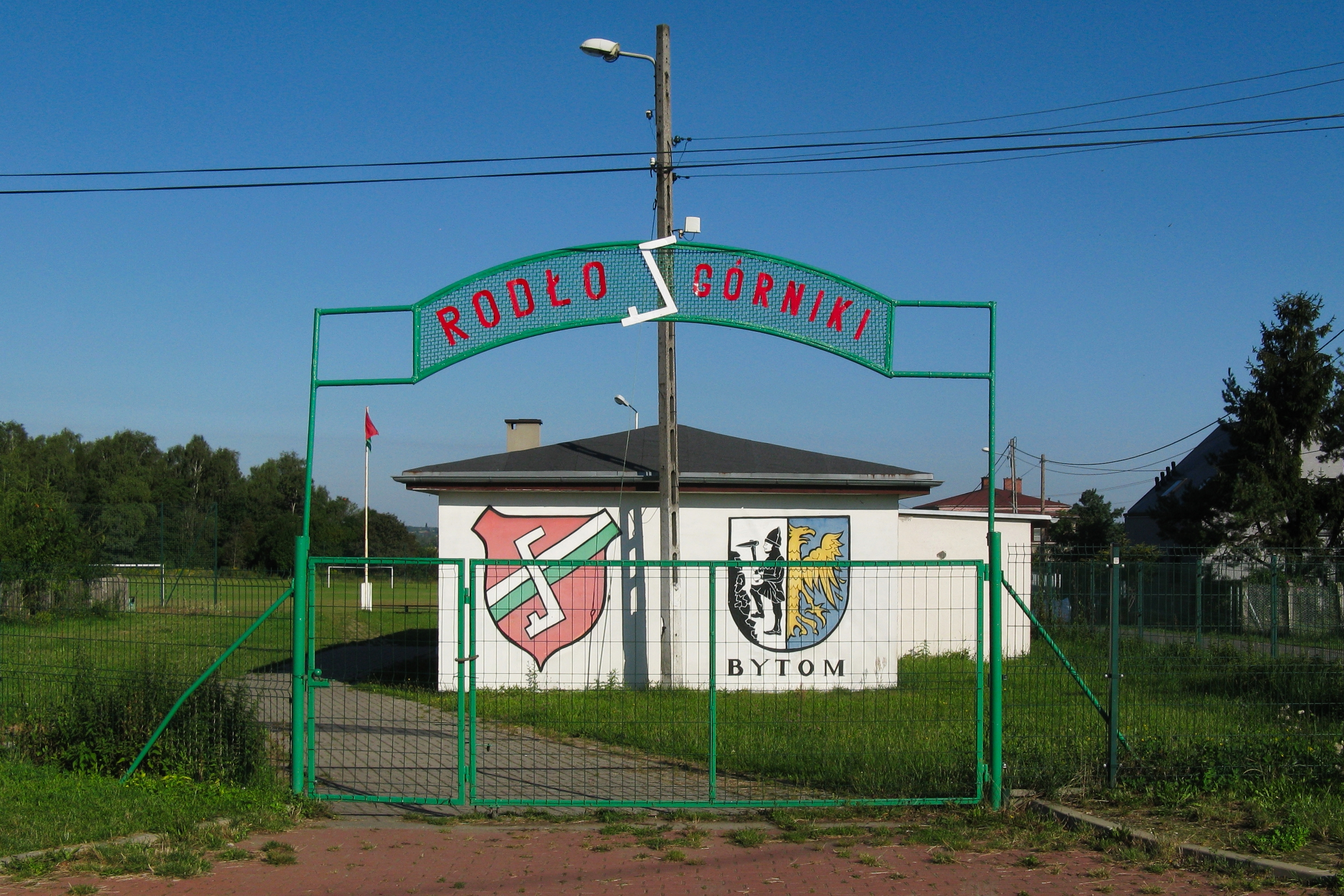
The entrance gate to Rodło Górniki's ground

In 1985 the People's Republic of Poland introduced the Rodło Medal. In 1992, after the fall of communism, it was discontinued.

== Bibliography ==
- (in Polish, English, and French) Helena Lehr, Edmund Osmańczyk. Polacy spod znaku Rodła. MON, Warszawa 1972
- Edmund Osmańczyk. Niezłomny proboszcz z Zakrzewa, rzecz o Księdzu Patronie Bolesławie Domańskim. Warszawa 1989, ISBN 83-07-01992-3
- Edmund Osmańczyk. Wisła i Kraków to Rodło. Nasza Księgarnia, Warszawa 1985, ISBN 83-10-08675-X
- W Wrzesiński. Polski ruch narodowy w Niemczech w latach 1922-1939. Ossolineum 1993
- Bogusław Czajkowski. Rodło. KAW, Warszawa 1975

== See also ==
- History of Poland
