= Bartosz Broniszewski =

German-Polish footballer

Personal information
- Date of birth: 23 January 1988 (age 38)
- Place of birth: Munich, West Germany
- Height: 1.80 m (5 ft 11 in)
- Position: Defender

Team information
- Current team: SC Pfullendorf
- Number: 23

Youth career
- –2003: Bayern Munich
- 2003–2005: SpVgg Unterhaching
- 2005–2007: 1899 Hoffenheim

Senior career*
Years	Team	Apps	(Gls)
2007–2008	1. FC Kaiserslautern	3	(1)
2007–2009	1. FC Kaiserslautern II	38	(1)
2009–2010	Rot-Weiß Essen	29	(1)
2011–2013	SV Wilhelmshaven	62	(2)
2013–2017	TSV Berg	80	(23)
2017–2020	FV Ravensburg	67	(5)
2020–	SC Pfullendorf		
- * Club domestic league appearances and goals

Bartosz Broniszewski (born 23 January 1988) is a German former professional football who plays as a defender for SC Pfullendorf. He is of Polish origin.
