= List of banned films =

For nearly the entire history of film production, certain films have been banned by film censorship or review organizations for political or moral reasons or for controversial content, such as racism, copyright violation, and underage immorality. Censorship standards vary widely by country, and can vary within an individual country over time due to political or moral change.

Many countries have government-appointed or private commissions to censor and rate productions for film and television exhibition. While it is common for films to be edited to fall into certain rating classifications, this list includes only films that have been explicitly prohibited from public screening. In some countries, films are banned on a wide scale; these are not listed in this table.

== Afghanistan ==
Date	Title	Notes
1996–2001	All	During the reign of the First Islamic Emirate government of Afghanistan, watching films or television was prohibited.
2008	The Kite Runner	Banned due to inciting violence.
2022-present	All foreign films	Starting May 2022, foreign films and programs deemed "indecent," critical of the Taliban, or promoting "foreign cultural values" were prohibited from being broadcast on television. This also included foreign films featuring women with uncovered heads or with immoral roles, and other banned programs. Alongside that, morality police shuttered shops selling DVDs of foreign films (particularly Indian and Western films) in various provinces, citing that they depicted values contrary to Afghan tradition.

== Albania ==
Date	Title	Notes
1980–1990	Pas vdekjes (After Death)	Banned for ten years under Communist regime of Enver Hoxha.

== Algeria ==
Date	Title	Notes
1959	Ben-Hur	Banned from all Arab League states because actress Haya Harareet was Israeli.
2006	Borat	Banned in every Arab League country except Lebanon.
2023	Barbie	On 13 August 2023, just three weeks after its release on 19 July, the screenings of Barbie were halted in film theaters in Algeria. According to Reuters, the official source was quoted as saying that the film "promotes homosexuality and other Western deviances" and that it "does not comply with Algeria's religious and cultural beliefs."

== Argentina ==
Date	Title	Notes
1941	Los afincaos (The Sons of the Earth)	This film, based on the stageplay of the same name, had to insert a disclaimer at the start that the action of the film does not take place in Argentina, due to the pressure from the censors at the time.
1941	I'll Never Heil Again	Banned during the conservative period of authoritarian governments known as "Infamous Decade" (1930–1943), for lampooning Nazi Germany; Argentina had declared itself neutral during World War Two.
1947	La mujer más honesta del mundo (The Most Honest Woman of the World)	This comedy film had its screening forbidden in Buenos Aires by the Municipal Censorship Commission due to the conservative public criticising it as "condoning immorality". As a result, the film could be only screened in an ephemeral and circumstantial way in some points of the interior of the country.
1954	La Tigra	This film, based on the work of the same name written by Florencio Sánchez about the encounter of a woman known as "the Tigress" and a student of fine arts, was banned by the administrative authority after rating it as "not suitable for ages under 18", alleging "low quality" and covert moralism, excluded the film from the regime of compulsory screening with which the domestic film industry was protected. It was shown edited in Canal 9 Sábados circulares show on 17 March 1962 and debuted commercially in an edited form on 10 September 1964. After 30 years when the film was thought to be lost, a copy from a Santa Fe film archive was found, being screened on Cine Club Núcleo in 1994.
1963	The Silence	Banned because of "obscenity".
1968	Ufa con el sexo	Banned under Juan Carlos Ongania's regime during the self-styled "Argentine Revolution" dictatorship (1966–1973), for "violating morality standards". The film was later screened in 2007.
1969–1971	Los Neuróticos	This film about a psychoanalyst whose only goal is to impress the women who attend his group therapies, which was originally shot in 1969, was banned by the classification board, which was in charge of censoring films. The film underwent several cuts to submit it again in order to receive classification, but in September, the censors maintained their decision. After several cuts and a new ratification in October, the film was finally authorized to be released in November 1971.
1971	México, la revolución congelada	This documentary was banned by the Argentinian embassador of Mexico, at behest of the President of Mexico Luis Echeverria, who warned that the film was a fierce criticism of a betrayed ideal rather than a praise of the "revolution made institution".
1972	Valle fértil	This documentary film did not see a commercial debut and was banned in the Valle Fértil Department by the de facto comptroller Luis Martínez, who supposed that it was due to the comment on Revista Clarín magazine titled "Valle Fértil: un pueblo que se extingue" (Valle Fertil: A people in extinction"). The film would later be screened in 2014.
1972	Last Tango in Paris	Banned during the self-styled "Argentine Revolution" dictatorship (1966–1973), for being "pornographic".
1973	Los traidores (The Traitors)	This film, produced by Bill Susmann and based on Víctor Proncet's story La víctima, which was based on the self-kidnapping of a Peronist labor leader, was banned during the self-styled "Argentine Revolution" dictatorship (1966–1973) for its controversial themes (which was about a Peronist labor leader who becomes a corrupt functionary after years of militancy until the presidency of Campora).
1973	Las Venganzas de Beto Sanchez (Beto Sanchez's Vendettas)	Banned during the self-styled "Argentine Revolution" dictatorship (1966–1973), due to its controversial storyline and themes. Its release was put "on hold" by the dictatorship until the democratically elected constitutional government of Héctor José Cámpora came to power, which allowed its distribution.
1974	Secuestro y muerte de Mr. Dupont (Kidnapping and Death of Mr. Dupont)	This drama film was not authorized to be screened by the military government and never premiered commercially.
1974	La Patagonia rebelde (Rebel Patagonia)	Banned under Isabel Perón's government (1974–1976) and Jorge Rafael Videla's regime during Argentina's last-civil military dictatorship (1976–1983). The historical film is about the suppression of a peasants' revolt, known as "Tragic Patagonia".
1976	Piedra libre	Banned under Videla's regime during Argentina's last-civil military dictatorship (1976–1983) due to its "innmoral content", "attacks on family, religion, morals, the distinct social classes, tradition and the basic values of the Argentinian system of life, by the perverted and negative spirit which rings throughout the film, through its absurde themes and various outrageous situations"
1976	Last Days of Mussolini (1974)	Banned under Videla's regime during Argentina's last-civil military dictatorship (1976–1983).
1976	The Great Dictator (1940)	Banned under Videla's regime during Argentina's last-civil military dictatorship (1976–1983), for mocking dictatorships.
1978	Las largas vacaciones del '36 (Long Vacations of 36)	Banned under Videla's regime during Argentina's last-civil military dictatorship (1976–1983), for its sarcastic view of Francoist Spain.
1978	Looking for Mr. Goodbar (1977)	Banned under Videla's regime during Argentina's last-civil military dictatorship (1976–1983), for being "pornographic".
1978	Pretty Baby	Banned under Videla's regime during Argentina's last-civil military dictatorship (1976–1983), due to child pornography concerns.
1979	Coming Home (1978)	Banned under Videla's regime during Argentina's last-civil military dictatorship (1976–1983), for its anti-war message.
1979	The House on Garibaldi Street	Banned under Videla's regime during Argentina's last-civil military dictatorship (1976–1983), because it depicts the hunt for Nazi criminal Adolf Eichmann.
1985	Je vous salue, Marie (Hail Mary)	Banned due to "blasphemous" and sexual content.
1988	The Last Temptation of Christ	Banned for being considered as "blasphemy".
1989	Kindergarten	Banned for its controversial themes, school shooting, scenes of nudity and unsimulated oral sex. A court order required all copies of the film to be seized and a ban on its exhibition. The film was finally shown in a restored copy in 2010, as part of the Mar del Plata International Film Festival.
2014	Borrando a papá (Erasing Dad)	This documentary about six fathers estranged from their children after conflictive divorces and hardships to keep their bonds with their children was scheduled to be premiered in 2014, but due to a court measure, it could not be commercially premiered and thus, was uploaded on YouTube.

== Australia ==
Date	Title	Notes
1972	Pink Flamingos	Banned on its initial release until the 1980s due to offensive content.
1975–1992	Salò, or the 120 Days of Sodom	Banned on its initial release, but lifted after seventeen years.
1976–2000	In the Realm of the Senses	Banned because of obscenity, though a censored version was made available in 1977. Only in 2000 did it finally become available in its complete cut.
2003	Ken Park	Banned and refused classification in 2003 for graphic depictions of teenage sex, incest, and auto-erotic asphyxiation.
2011	The Human Centipede 2 (Full Sequence)	Temporarily banned for cruel, disturbing, and sexually explicit content. A censored DVD version was later released on 23 February 2012.

== Azerbaijan ==
Date	Title	Notes
2011	Hostage (Azerbaijani)	Banned because the plot presents Armenians in a positive light.

== Bahamas ==
Date	Title	Notes
2024	Demon Slayer: Kimetsu no Yaiba – To the Hashira Training	Banned by the Bahamas Plays and Film Control Board, allegedly for lack of an English dub.

== Bahrain ==
Date	Title	Notes
1959	Ben-Hur	Banned from all Arab League states because actress Haya Harareet was Israeli.
2006	Borat	Banned in every Arab League country except Lebanon.
2007	The Kingdom	Banned because of an inaccurate depiction of a 1996 bombing in Saudi Arabia.
2014	Noah	Banned due to depiction of prophets.
2021	Eternals	Banned due to the film's character of Phastos and his husband.
2022	Lightyear	Banned due to a brief lesbian kiss scene.
2022	Thor: Love and Thunder	Banned due to LGBT representation.
2023	Spider-Man: Across the Spider-Verse	Banned due to it containing frames which feature a transgender flag on which the phrase "Protect Trans Kids" is displayed.

== Bangladesh ==
Date	Title	Notes
1991	Remembrance of '71	This documentary by Tanvir Mokammel, on the Bangladesh Liberation war was banned by the Bangladesh Film Censor Board.
1994	Nodir Naam Modhumoti	This film was banned for being "anti-nationalistic". The director Tanvir Mokammel appealed the ban to the Bangladesh Supreme Court, and then, to the Bangladesh High Court. The film eventually was released in 1996, after the Awami League returned to power.
1995	Muktir Gaan	This documentary by Tareque Masud and Catherine Masud was objected by the Censor Board out of concern that the songs featured in it were pro-Awami League. Overturned in 1996.
2005	Teardrops of Karnaphuli	This documentary by Tanvir Mokammel about the effects of Kaptai Dam on the indigenous community in Chittagong Hill Tracts was banned in Bangladesh.
2009	Nomuna	This satirical film by Enamul Karim Nirjhar had its release refused by the Censor Board for its satire of political figures of Bangladesh.
2011	Hridoy Bhanga Dheu	This film was banned because the main villain in the film wore a Mujib Coat, a coat worn by Sheikh Mujibur Rahman, the first President of Bangladesh.
2015	Mor Thengari	This Chakma language film (which was the first of its kind) was refused certification by the Censor Board as the Bangladesh Army lodged a complaint that the film showed the activities of the army in the Chittagong Hill Tracts which is a sensitive issue, as well for their negative portrayal (along with the police forces') during the Chittagong Hill Tracts conflict. The Ministry of Information in a letter to the Censor board objecting to some scenes of the film, requesting their deletion. The director, Aung Rakhine, withdrew the film rather than cut it, accusing the Censor Board of violating human rights.
2016	Rana Plaza	This film about a garment factory worker's 17-day fight to survive under the debris of Rana Plaza, a building that collapsed on 24 April 2013, was banned by the Bangladesh Film Censor Board due to a petition from the Bangladesh National Garment Workers League chief Sirajul Islam, as the film featured scenes considered "frightening" as well the names of security forces, which is considered a breach of the law.
2023	Faraaz	Faraaz, directed by Hansal Mehta, was released on 3 February 2023, in India and received mixed reviews from critics. This film is based on the 2016 Dhaka attack wherein 29 people were killed, including 20 hostages (17 foreigners and 3 locals), two police officers, five gunmen, and two bakery staff. Ruba Ahmed, the mother of Abinta Kabir, who was killed by militants in the Holey Artisan Attack on 1 July 2016, filed the writ on 12 February 2023. After hearing that writ petition, the High Court bench of Md. Khasruzzaman and Justice Md Iqbal Kabir delivered this order to ban this misleading film.

== Belgium ==
Date	Title	Notes
1940–1945	La Kermesse Heroïque (Carnival in Flanders) (1935)	Banned in Nazi-occupied Belgium by Joseph Goebbels because of its pacifist themes. The director, Jacques Feyder, was later hunted down for arrest but managed to hide in Switzerland.
1976–1994	In the Realm of the Senses	Banned on its initial release because of its graphic sex scenes, being the last film subject to censorship in the country. It was the only European country at that time where the film was banned. Since 1994 the ban is no longer in effect.

== Brazil ==
Date	Title	Notes
1940–1946	The Great Dictator	Banned by the Getúlio Vargas dictatorship for being "communist" and "demoralizing the Armed Forces".
1955	Rio, 100 Degrees F.	Banned for being "communist propaganda" and for presenting negative facts of Brazil. Trying to justify the ban, the Brazilian government alleged that "In Rio de Janeiro, the temperature did not reach over 39.6 °C".
1964–1984	Twenty Years Later	Banned for being a "manifesto of communism". During production, in 1964, the plot, the photographer and other material were seized and crew members were arrested. The film tells the story of João Pedro Teixeira, a union leader from Paraíba murdered in 1962. Ban overturned in 1984.
1969–2017	El Justicero	Film banned in 1969 for criticizing the ruling military dictatorship. The original 35mm film was seized by the authorities and later destroyed. For these reasons, the film was lost until 2017, when a 16mm copy was restored and re-released in DVD in Brazil.
1971–1978	A Clockwork Orange	Banned during the military dictatorship for containing obscenity and "promiscuous content". A censored version with black polka dots covering the breasts and genitals of the actors in the nude scenes became available in the country in 1978.
1972–1979	Last Tango in Paris	Banned during the military dictatorship for containing obscene scenes which were considered by the government as an "attempt against morality and good habits". Ban lifted in 1979.
1974–1980	Emmanuelle	Banned during the military dictatorship for obscenity and graphic sexual scenes. The ban was lifted in 1980.
1974–1980	The Texas Chain Saw Massacre	Banned during the military dictatorship for containing violent scenes that were considered by the government as an "attempt against morality and good habits". Ban lifted in the early 1980s.
1975–1980	Iracema: Uma Transa Amazônica	Banned during the military dictatorship for explicit sexual content.
1976–1980	In the Realm of the Senses	Banned during the military dictatorship for pornography and graphic sexual scenes. Ban lifted in 1980.
1979	Di Cavalcanti	Banned due to a court decision obtained by the artist's adopted daughter Di Cavalcanti, Elizabeth Di Cavalcanti, alleging that her father's image was violated due to the film containing scenes from the artist's funeral and burial. However, in 2004, members of the family of the filmmaker Glauber Rocha, made the work available in full version on a server outside Brazil, to circumvent the film's ban.
1982–1983	Pra Frente, Brasil	Banned at the time of its release for containing political criticism of the military dictatorship. Ban lifted a year later.
1982–2018	Love Strange Love	Banned due to a lawsuit filed by Xuxa, a member of the cast. Ban lifted in 2018. Brazilian television showed the film on 12 February 2021, on Canal Brasil.
1985–1988	Je vous salue, Marie	Banned during the government of president José Sarney for blasphemy. Ban lifted after the promulgation of the new Brazilian Constitution in 1988.
1988	The Last Temptation of Christ	Theatrical exhibition in eight theaters in the city of São Paulo banned during the administration of the then mayor of São Paulo, Jânio Quadros.
1993	Beyond Citizen Kane	Banned in Brazil due to a lawsuit filed by Roberto Marinho.
2011–2012	A Serbian Film	Banned due to it being an "excuse for paedophilia" and extreme violence. The film was shown at the VII Fantastic Film Festival in Porto Alegre and was selected for the Fantastic Film Festival in Rio de Janeiro. However, it was removed from the event's schedule by order of Caixa, the festival's sponsor. A new screening of the film was scheduled by the organizers of the event outside the festival, but the copy of the film was seized by a court order, due to a lawsuit filed by the regional office of the Democrats party. Ban lifted in July 2012.
2013	Heavenly Puss and The Two Mouseketeers	Two Tom and Jerry short films, released respectively in 1949 and 1952, were confiscated "for editorial issues and appropriateness of the content to the target audience—children of 7 to 11 years".

== Bulgaria ==
Date	Title	Notes
1967–1990	Privarzaniyat balon (The Tied Up Balloon)	Banned during the Communist era for criticizing the communist leaders during World War II. After Bulgaria became a democratic nation in 1990, the ban was lifted.

== Cambodia ==
Date	Title	Notes
2014	Who Killed Chea Vichea?	Banned for investigating the mysterious 2004 assassination of Chea Vichea, one of Cambodia's most influential union leaders who spent years fighting for increased wages and improved working conditions for the nation's 300,000 garment workers.
2015	Fifty Shades of Grey	Banned for "insane romance, numerous sex sequence, the use of violence during sex" and for being "entirely related to sexual matters that are too extreme for Khmer society".
2015	No Escape	Banned for its "negative portrayal of local culture".
2017	Kingsman: The Golden Circle	Banned for portraying Cambodia as a base for the film's antagonists.
2021	Methagu	Banned at the request of the Sri Lankan government for reflecting the life of Velupillai Prabhakaran, leader of LTTE.
2023	No More Bets	Banned for "seriously damages Cambodia's image and reputation."
2025-present	All Thai films	All films that were made in Thailand were banned by the Cambodian government due to a border dispute that strained relations between each nation. The dispute began in May 2025, when clashes at the border between these nations killed a Cambodian soldier.

== Commonwealth of Independent States ==
Date	Title	Notes
2015	Child 44 (2015)	Banned since 15 April 2015, when the Russian film distributor Central Partnership announced that the film would be withdrawn from cinemas in Russia, although some media stated that screening of the film was blocked by the Russian Ministry of Culture. The decision was made following the press screening the day before. The Ministry of Culture and the Central Partnership issued a joint press release stating that the screening of the film before the 70th anniversary of the Victory Day was unacceptable. The Ministry of Culture claimed that it received several questions on the film's contents, primarily concerning "distortion of historical facts, peculiar treatment of events before, during and after the Great Patriotic War and images and characters of Soviet people of that era". Russian minister of culture Vladimir Medinsky welcomed the decision, but stressed that it was made solely by the Central Partnership. However, in his personal statement Medinsky complained that the film depicts Russians as "physically and morally base sub-humans", and compared the depiction of Soviet Union in the film with J. R. R. Tolkien's Mordor, and wished that such films should be screened neither before the 70th anniversary of the victory in the Great Patriotic War, nor any other time. However, he also stated that the film would be available in Russia on DVD and online. As a result of the decision the film was also withdrawn from cinemas in Belarus, Ukraine, Kazakhstan, and Kyrgyzstan, while release of the film has been postponed until October in Georgia. Ukrainian film director and producer Alexander Rodnyansky criticised the decision not to release Child 44 as bad for the country's film industry. "Before, films where Soviet and Russian heroes were presented not in the best way have been released in Russia, but nothing similar happened. Now everything to do with history should clearly fit into a kind of framework set by the culture ministry."

== Comoros ==
Date	Title	Notes
1959	Ben-Hur	Banned from all Arab League states because actress Haya Harareet was Israeli.
2006	Borat	Banned in every Arab League country except Lebanon.

== Cuba ==
Date	Title	Notes
1966	Red Zone Cuba	Banned due to its negative portrayal of Cubans.
1980	Cuba Crossing	Banned by the Cuban government.
1984	Red Dawn	Banned by the Cuban government for negatively portraying Cubans.
1992	Captain Ron	Banned by the Cuban government.
1992	A Few Good Men	Banned by the Cuban government.
1995	GoldenEye	Banned by the Cuban government for portraying Soviets.
1996	Azúcar Amarga	Banned by the Cuban government.
2008	Harold & Kumar Escape from Guantanamo Bay	Banned due to its negative setting of Cuba.
2014	Camp X-Ray	Banned by the Cuban government.
2019	Cuban Love	Banned due to its negative portrayal of Cubans.
2020	Without Havana	Banned by the Cuban government.
2021	Blue Heart	Banned by the Cuban government because of depicting a dysfunctional society.
2024	Chronicles of the Absurd	Banned by the Cuban government for its depiction of state censorship with clandestine audio recordings.

== Czechoslovakia ==
Date	Title	Notes
1969–1989	The Hand	Banned by the Czechoslovak Communist government from 1969 to 1989.
1967–1989	Daisies	Banned under the Communist regime for "depicting the wanton". The film's director, Věra Chytilová, was forbidden from working again until 1975.
1966–1968, 1969–1989	A Report on the Party and the Guests	Banned from 1966 to 1968 because of its political satire. After a short release during the Prague Spring, it was banned again for the next twenty years. In 1974, director Jan Němec emigrated.
1968–1989	The Firemen's Ball	Banned by the Czechoslovak Communist government in 1968 for "mocking the working class". Director Miloš Forman relocated to the United States.
1968–1989	Deserters and Pilgrims (also known as The Deserters and the Nomads)	Banned by the Czechoslovak Communist government.
1968–1989	The Shop on Main Street	Banned by the Czechoslovak Communist government.
1969–1989	Funeral Ceremonies (Smuteční slavnost)	Banned by the Czechoslovak Communist government.
1969–1989	The Seventh Day, The Eighth Night (Den sedmý, osmá noc)	Banned by the Czechoslovak Communist government.
1969–1989	Squandered Sunday (Zabitá neděle)	Banned by the Czechoslovak Communist government for twenty years, with its director, Drahomíra Vihanová, being banned from making new films until 1977.
1969–1989	The Cremator	Banned by the Czechoslovak Communist government from 1969 until 1989 because this black comedy depicts a crematorium director who enjoys burning people and sides with the Nazis during the Holocaust.
1969–1989	All My Compatriots (also known as All My Countrymen)	Banned by the Czechoslovak Communist government. Its director, Vojtěch Jasný went into exile.
1969–1989	Birds, Orphans and Fools	Banned by the Czechoslovak Communist government for depicting three people orphaned by political violence and trying to mentally survive, despite not being free.
1969–1989	Larks on a String	Banned until the fall of the Communist government in 1989.
1970–1989	Hlídač (Prison Guard)	Banned by the Czechoslovak Communist government.
1970–1989	Fruit of Paradise	Banned by the Czechoslovak Communist government for its shocking content. Its director, Věra Chytilová, was forbidden from making new films for eight years.
1970–1989	Witchhammer	Banned by the Czechoslovak Communist government.
1970–1989	Ucho (The Ear)	Banned by the Czechoslovak Communist government until 1989, because the story depicts a couple who think they are under government surveillance.
1971–1989	Nahota (Naked)	Banned by the Czechoslovak Communist government.
1972–1989	Case for a Rookie Hangman	Banned by the Czechoslovak Communist government for its satirical depiction of Czech society, which meant the end of the director Pavel Juráček's career.
1972–1989	Leonardo's Diary	Banned by the Communist government for depicting life in Czechoslovakia in a critical light. Its director, Jan Švankmajer, was banned from working for five years.
1975–1989	The Apple Game	Banned by the Czechoslovak Communist government. The director, Věra Chytilová, personally asked for more information at the censor board and heard that the Soviet embassy felt the subject matter was "too heavy-duty".
1977–1989	Castle of Otranto	Banned by the Czechoslovak Communist government after its director, Jan Švankmajer, refused to change anything about the film. Government censors objected to its mockumentary tone, which could undermine people's faith in the TV news. Švankmajer himself was banned from making films for eight years.
1982–1989	Dimensions of Dialogue	Banned because the Communist government censors didn't like its criticism of consumerism. The ban was more than likely also a result of its director, Jan Švankmajer, having been banned twice before in the past.
1983–1989	Straka v hrsti (A Magpie in the Hand)	Banned by the Communist government because the film was based on a script by Antonín Přidal, an author who was banned by the government, and because it featured the subversive rock band Pražský výběr.

== Democratic Republic of the Congo ==
Date	Title	Notes
2015	L'Homme Qui Repare Les Femmes (The Man Who Mends Women)	Banned because "a clear desire to harm the Congolese army and tarnish its image," the government spokesman and Minister of Media and Communication accused the director of having mistranslated and therefore misrepresented certain remarks in Swahili and Mashi.

== Denmark ==
Date	Title	Notes
1930	The Skeleton Dance	Banned initially in 1930 because the censors deemed the film "too macabre" for children. Today the ban is no longer in effect.

== Djibouti ==
Date	Title	Notes
1959	Ben-Hur	Banned from all Arab League states because actress Haya Harareet was Israeli.
2006	Borat	Banned in every Arab League country except Lebanon.

== Egypt ==
Date	Title	Notes
1953	The Desert Rats	Possibly because the government did not want to remind its people that it was the Eighth Army which defended Egypt.
1959	Ben-Hur	Banned from all Arab League states because actress Haya Harareet was Israeli.
1960	Exodus	Banned due to actor Paul Newman's "material support for Zionism and Israel".
1968	Funny Girl	Banned because the Egyptian Muslim lead (Omar Sharif) is portrayed in a romantic storyline with Jewish actress Barbra Streisand. Streisand's political support for Israel at the height of military tensions between Egypt and Israel was also a factor.
1994	The Emigrant	This film, which is loosely based on the story of the Biblical character Joseph, raised several protests, since Islam forbids the visual depiction of religious figures. After achieving all necessary approvals from the censors, the film ran successfully in Egyptian cinema until a lawsuit initiated by a fundamentalist Islamist lawyer caused a temporary ban. After a year-long court battle, the director Youssef Chahine won the case, only to face a second ban resulting from a lawsuit initiated by a Christian lawyer who objected to the film's deviations from the Biblical account.
1998	The Prince of Egypt	Banned for religious reasons.
2003	The Matrix Reloaded	Banned due to violent content and its religious themes.
2003–2007	Bruce Almighty	It was banned for imaging God as an ordinary man and is deemed blasphemous to Islam. The ban was lifted four years later.
2006	Borat	Banned in every Arab League country except Lebanon.
2006	The Da Vinci Code	Banned because of blasphemous content.
2014	Halawet Rooh (Rouh's Beauty)	Banned right after screening the film in cinemas, after criticism over scenes deemed sexually provocative. The film was criticized for copying Giuseppe Tornatore's film Malèna (2000) starring Italian actress Monica Bellucci.
2014	Exodus: Gods and Kings	Banned for historical inaccuracies and showing history from a Zionist viewpoint.
2022	Doctor Strange in the Multiverse of Madness	Banned because it includes America Chavez, a lesbian character.
2022	Lightyear	Banned because of a same-sex kiss.
2022	Thor: Love and Thunder	Banned due to LGBT representation.
2023	Spider-Man: Across the Spiderverse	Banned due to it containing frames which feature a transgender flag on which the phrase "Protect Trans Kids" is displayed.

== Fiji ==
Date	Title	Notes
2009	Adhura Sapna	Banned due to racial themes towards Fijians.

== Finland ==
Date	Title	Notes
1930–1952	Battleship Potemkin	Banned out of fear of inciting a Communist revolution.
1943–1945	Mrs. Miniver	Banned during World War II.
1943–1950	Johnny Eager	Banned during World War II and finally released on March 31, 1950.
1955–1959	Rififi	Banned for its depiction of cracking security safes. The government feared it might inspire copycat crimes. The ban was lifted after five years.
1960–1981	Peeping Tom	Banned for 21 years.
1962–1986	One, Two, Three	Banned for 24 years due to its political satire, which could offend their ally and neighbouring country, the Soviet Union. (Finland had a policy of Finlandization).
1969–1989	The Great Silence	Banned by the Finnish Board of Film in June 1969 for violence. Ban was lifted in February 1989 after several minutes of cuts. The film was still rated as K18 (suitable for adults only) and as such VHS versions of the film were also not allowed. The film has never received a proper premier in Finland although it has been aired three times in television (1994, 1999 and 2009).
1971–2000	The Devils	Banned on its initial release in 1971 for violence and content which could potentially be hazardous to mental health. The decision to ban was ultimately taken to highest available court which did not lift the ban. A second round of banning was then seen in 1985 and the government officials used the same exact phrasing in their decision to ban as was done 14 years earlier. The ban was finally automatically lifted after a law change in 2001.
1972	One Day in the Life of Ivan Denisovich	Banned by the Finnish Board of Film. In 1972 and 1974 Swedish television showed the film, resulting in the Swedish television mast on Åland being shut down during the film because Finns were banned from seeing the film. Director of the Finnish Board of Film, Jerker Eriksson, said that the banning of the film was political because it harmed the Finnish-Soviet relationship. Finnish television showed the film in 1996 on the TV1 YLE channel.
1972	Dirty Harry	Banned in February 1972 for violence and mental health reasons. The distributor challenged the banning and took the decision to ban to Finnish Supreme administrative Court which ruled against banning. After minor cuts, it was banned again. A second round of court cases (again, won by the distributor) forced the banning authorities to allow the film to be distributed. They did so but only after mandatory cuts of over three minutes. Finally in January 1973 the cut film premiered in Finland.
1974–1996	The Texas Chain Saw Massacre	Banned because of graphic violence.
1976	Ultime grida dalla savana	This film is entirely banned for the possible inclusion of scenes of genuine human death.
1976–2000	Salò o le 120 giornate di Sodoma	Banned in 1976 for moral, mental health and appropriateness reasons. The banning renewed again in 1984 with the defined exception of two specific screenings by the Finnish Film Archive. Finally a law change in 2001 removed the ban.
1980	Cruising	Banned on its initial release.
1980–2000	All Friday the 13th films	Banned on each films' initial release until a law change in 2001 when all films in the franchise automatically reverted to a K18 (adults only) classification.
1981–1991	Dead & Buried	Banned on its initial release. A considerably shortened version was allowed in 1991 with a K16 classification (allowed for persons over the age of 16).
1982	Just Before Dawn	Banned for violence for 4 months until a cut version (around 2 minutes of cuts) was allowed with a classification of K18 (adults only).
1986	Born American	Banned in January 1986 for its violence and for political reasons. The political reasons were that the film was "potentially harmful to international relations". A court appeal to Finnish Supreme administrative Court decided against the banning (after some cuts would be made) and authorities were forced to dismantle the ban (with more cuts) and the film premiered in late December 1986 after a struggle of almost a year. 20 years after the film was banned, it was revealed (by a politics researcher and academic Juhani Suomi in his book "Kohti sinipunaa") that the authorities were in fact "instructed" to ban the film and that the banning was dictated by the Soviet Union's ambassador Vladimir Sobolev. Born American was the last film in Finland to suffer banning for political reasons.
1986–2000	The House on the Edge of the Park	Banned for violence in 1986; it took six years after the film's release for any distributor to even try to get a classification. A law change in 2001 finally lifted the ban.
1988–2003	Child's Play	Banned due to excessive graphic violence.

== France ==
Date	Title	Notes
1923	The Birth of a Nation	
1925–1953	Battleship Potemkin	Banned due to fears that it could inspire revolution.
1930	L'Age d'Or	Banned in Paris by the police prefect "in the name of public order".
1933–1946	Zéro de Conduite	Banned because of a plot where pupils take over a repressive school. The ban remained in effect under Nazi occupation for the same reason.
1943	Le Corbeau	Banned from 1945 until 1947, because the film was produced under the Nazi regime with financial support too. It was also seen as a negative portrayal of French people and accused of harboring sympathies for the Vichy regime. After two years, however, the ban was lifted again.
1950–1990	Afrique 50	Banned for criticizing the French colonial rule. Its director, René Vautier, was condemned to one year in prison.
1953	Les statues meurent aussi (Statues Also Die)	Banned because it suggested that Western civilization is responsible for the decline of African art. The film was seen at the Cannes Film Festival in 1953, but subsequently banned by the French censor.
1954	Avant le déluge	Banned due to its controversial criminal content.
1954–1981	Carmen Jones	Banned due to a technicality in copyright laws on order of the estate of composer Georges Bizet (on whose opera Carmen the film was based).
1955–1957	Bel Ami	Banned on its initial release. Released after two years in a censored version.
1955–1980	Le Rendez-vous des quais	Banned for representing dockers who refused to dispatch military supplies for use in the Indochina War.
1957–1975	Paths of Glory	Banned in France for two decades because of its critical depiction of the French army during World War I.
1960	Le Petit Soldat	Banned on political grounds; the ban was lifted in 1963 with re-editing.
1961	Tu ne tueras point	Banned for two years because it depicts a soldier during World War II who has conscientious objections.
1965–1971	The Battle of Algiers	Banned for six years because of its pro-Algerian and anticolonial message.
1965–1971	Det kære legetøj	Banned for advocating pornography.
1972	Mais ne nous délivrez pas du mal	Banned for its depiction of violence and sexuality involving adolescents.
1974–1977	The Texas Chain Saw Massacre	Banned for its violent and sadistic content.
1977	Camp de Thiaroye	Banned for criticizing the colonial system.
2000	Baise-Moi	Banned from French cinema screens in 2000 after being given an X-rating. Eventually, in August 2001, it was reclassified from age bracket 16 to 18.
2016	Antichrist	Banned on 3 February 2016, over sexual and violent content, despite being allowed on its initial release in 2009. The ban was a result of the Catholic traditionalist pressure group Promouvoir who wanted the 16 rating to be reclassified to prevent minors from seeing it. A French court ruled in their favor. As a new certificate is being decided the film is now banned from all cinemas, TV broadcasts, and video releases. The film was released uncut in 2023 with an 18 certificate, the highest in the country.

== Ghana ==
Date	Title	Notes
1955	Les Maîtres Fous	A documentary about the religious rituals of the Hauka tribe. Banned in Ghana and several other French and English colonies in Africa at the time because of the Africans' blatant attempts to mimic and mock the "white oppressors". On the other hand, African students, teachers, and directors found the film to perpetrate an "exotic racism" of the African people.

== Greece ==
Date	Title	Notes
1914	Golfo (1914)	Banned for its royalist sentiments.
1967–1974	Z (1969)	Banned under the colonel's regime, for being critical of the junta.

== Hong Kong ==
Date	Title	Notes
2017–present	All Winnie-the-Pooh films	Films featuring Winnie-the-Pooh are banned from mainland China due to the offending internet meme comparison with General Secretary of the Chinese Communist Party Xi Jinping in 2017. Even the horror parody films, Winnie-the-Pooh: Blood and Honey and its sequel, are not allowed in that region.
2022	The Dark Knight	Banned in 2022 after a review, despite it being partially filmed in Hong Kong and having previously been allowed.

== Hungary ==
Date	Title	Notes
1945	Jud Süss (1940)	Banned since the end of the World War II due to its anti-Jewish and pro-Nazi content.
c.1945–1957	Emberek a havason (People of the Mountains)	The film, based on the work of József Nyirő, who was considered fascist, was banned, primarily because of its religious content, and could only be screened in Hungary from 1957. (Interestingly, Goebbels banned it in the Third Reich for the same reason.)
1947–1979	Ének a búzamezőkről (Song of the Cornfields)	Banned for being 'clerical', depiction of the controversial issue of Hungarian prisoners held by the Soviets and depicting religious values.
1956–1986	Keserű igazság (Bitter Truth)	Banned for criticising the forced industrialisation of Hungary.
1956–1989	Eltüsszentett birodalom (An Empire Sneezed Away)	Banned for depicting a monarch sharing similarities with the dictatorship of Hungarian communist leader Mátyás Rákosi.
1957–1984	A nagyrozsdási eset (The Nagyrozsdás case)	Nagyrozsdás is an imaginary small town in Hungary, the film is a satire. Banned for depicting the corruption of the dictatorship of Hungarian communist leader Mátyás Rákosi.
1969–1981, 1998–2010	A tanú (The Witness)	Banned under the Communist government for almost a decade, because it satirized the regime. Was later banned again in 1998 for containing an explicit depiction of animal abuse. This scene was later cut, resulting in the film being unbanned in 2010 and released with a 12 rating.
1973–1984	A határozat (The decision)	The documentary, made in the final hours of the reform attempts of the so-called "new economic mechanism", shows how the leaders of the Bicske district party organization try to remove the manager-type, agile and successful president of the Új Élet Production Cooperative in Felcsút in an autocratic manner, by party decision, but their undermining efforts temporarily fail due to the resistance of the production cooperative membership.
1974–1984	Bástyasétány hetvennégy (Bastion promenade '74)	Banned for unclear reasons.
1976–?	Tantörténet (Fairy tale)	The documentary tells the story of a Hungarian woman.
1981–1986	Verzió (Version)	The film is about the infamous Tiszaeszlár blood libel of 1882. It was banned and only released after the director's (Miklós Erdély) death in 1986.
1982–1989	Pócspetri (Pócspetri is a Hungarian village town in northeastern Hungary)	The documentary examined the civil unrest in the settlement of Pócspetri in 1948 – distorted in the press at the time – and the subsequent trials.
1983–1989	Álombrigád (Dream Brigade)	Banned for being too radical.
1984	The Final Countdown	Presumably it was banned for political reasons.
1985–1989	Hagyd beszélni Kutruczot! (Let Kutrucz speak!)	This was a documentary film that processed journalist Gizella Kutrucz's research into the anti-Semitic writer Zoltán Bosnyák, who was executed under mysterious circumstances in 1952.
1985–1989	„Bebukottak” (Hungarian slang word, meaning approximately "they failed")	This documentary film presented the life of the juvenile prison in Tököl was banned due to its brutality – with only acted scenes in the film. It was only after the Hungarian regime change in 1990 that it could be freely distributed again.
1994	ÁVOsok (ÁVOs)	The 1994 MTV film about the ÁVO (Hungarian State Police State Defense Department) was banned due to a complaint by Mazsihisz (Federation of the Jewish Communities of Hungary), on the grounds that it emphasized the origin of the perpetrators of the murder of Raoul Wallenberg.
1994	Törvénytelen szocializmus (Illegal Socialism)	The 1994 MTV film about illegal Socialism was banned due to a complaint by Mazsihisz (Federation of the Jewish Communities of Hungary), on the grounds that it exaggerated the origin of the perpetrators.

== Iceland ==
Date	Title	Notes
1985–1999	The Texas Chain Saw Massacre (1974)	Banned due to high level of violence; a censored version was later released.
1987	Nekromantik	Banned due to its transgressive subject matter (including necrophilia) and audacious imagery.
1992	Cannibal Holocaust	Banned due to very high impact violence and offensive depictions of both human and animal cruelty. Still banned.

== Indonesia ==
Date	Title	Notes
1955	Genangan Air Mata (1955)	Banned as of Roostijati's death in 1975.
1976	Max Havelaar	Banned for its parallels between the anti-colonial story and the then present-day regime.
1982	The Year of Living Dangerously	Banned for its criticism of Sukarno's regime. The ban was lifted in 1999.
1994	Schindler's List	Banned for violence and nudity, although also opposed by some Muslim clerics for its sympathetic treatment of Jews.
1994	True Lies	Banned due to controversy that focused on Muslim leaders insulting Islam and portraying themselves as religious extremists.
2006	The Black Road, Tale of Crocodiles, Passabe, and Timor Lorosae: The Unseen Massacre	Banned for being critical of the Indonesian Government. The Black Road is about Aceh and the other three films are about East Timor.
2007	Long Road to Heaven	Banned on the island of Bali, as local politicians worried that the film, which about the 2002 Bali bombings, might promote hatred and intolerance.
2009	Balibo	Banned for being critical of the Indonesian government. This Australian film is based on the story of the Balibo Five, a group of journalists killed during the 1975 Indonesian invasion of East Timor.
2014	Noah	Banned because of its depiction of the prophets.
2015	Fifty Shades of Grey	Banned due to its sexual content; however, Johan Tjasmadi, member of Lembaga Sensor Film (Film Censorship Board), said that the film was never registered to the board.

== Iran ==
Date	Title	Notes
1969	Gaav (The Cow)	Banned briefly by the regime of The Shah, due to what was perceived as the film depicting Iran as a rural, culturally backwards society. The film would later be allowed to screen on the condition that the film would begin with a disclaimer explaining to audiences that the film is set several decades ago, and does not reflect a modern Iran.
1975	Salò, or the 120 Days of Sodom	Banned due to graphic violence and nudity.
1980	Cruising	Banned on its initial release.
1981	Bita	Banned under the censorship act of 1981 because it criticized exploitation of women by men.
1981	Ghaire aze Khoudo Hitch Kass Naboud	Banned under the censorship act of 1981 because it depicts a lesbian relationship and a controversy.
1996	Gabbeh	Banned for being "subversive".
1996	Nūn o goldūn (A Moment of Innocence)	Banned because of its theme that different people can experience the same incident in a different way.
2000	The Circle	Briefly banned on its initial release.
2001	Zoolander	Banned for perceived support of gay rights.
2002	Ten	Banned for discussion of gender discrimination.
2003	Crimson Gold	
2003	Bruce Almighty	Banned for the blasphemous content.
2004–2020	Marmoulak	Pulled from cinemas two weeks after its premiere in Iran due to the film mocking conservative attitudes of the clerics in Iran. In 2020, the uncut film was granted a license for screening by the Ministry of Culture and Islamic Guidance.
2006	Offside	
2010	300	Banned for its negative portrayal of Persian people and the Achaemenid Empire.
2012	Argo	Banned for its negative portrayal of Iran. It was the only Academy Award-winning Best Picture to be banned in the country.
2020	There Is No Evil	Secretly recorded and banned from exhibition for its themes criticising the Iranian government's use of capital punishment. The government also temporarily prohibited the film's director Mohammad Rasoulof from making films in the country, imprisoned him, and prohibited him from travel outside Iran.

== Iraq ==
Date	Title	Notes
1959	Ben-Hur	Banned from all Arab League states because actress Haya Harareet was Israeli.
1999	South Park: Bigger, Longer & Uncut	Banned under the Ba'athist regime for depicting Saddam Hussein in a mocking light.
2006	Borat	Banned in every Arab League country except Lebanon.
2015	American Sniper	Banned for being an "insult to the population".
2022	Lightyear	Banned due to a brief lesbian kiss scene.

== Israel ==
Date	Title	Notes
1948	Oliver Twist	Banned on its initial release, because the character of Fagin was deemed to be antisemitic.
1957	The Girl in the Kremlin	Banned because it may have harmed Israel's diplomatic relations with Moscow.
1957	China Gate	Banned for "indulg[ing] in excessive cruelty". The Israeli film censorship board indicated the film depicted Chinese and Russian soldiers as "monsters".
1965	Goldfinger	Banned after it was revealed that one of the main actors, Gert Fröbe, had a Nazi past. The film had only run for six weeks in the theaters. It was unbanned a few months later when a man went to the Israeli Embassy in Vienna and told the staff that Fröbe hid him and his mother from the Nazis (which may have saved their lives).
1973	Hitler: The Last Ten Days	Banned because the censorship board unanimously felt that the portrayal of Hitler was "too human".
1987	In the Realm of the Senses	Banned because of pornographic content.
1988	The Last Temptation of Christ	Banned on the grounds that it could offend Christians.
2004, 2021	Jenin, Jenin	Banned by the Israeli Film Ratings Board on the premise that it was libelous and might offend the public; the Supreme Court of Israel later overturned the decision. In 2021, the film was banned yet again after a lower court ruled in favor of a plaintiff who had appeared in the film.
2004	Shrek 2	Banned briefly in 2004, though not for the film itself, but because of the Hebrew dub. A joke about Israeli singer David D'Or's high voice was added, in which one character threatened to emasculate another by saying "Let's do a David D'or on him". This remark prompted the artist to take legal action, prompting the film to be redubbed for home video releases (excluding the Blu-Ray version).

== Italy ==
Date	Title	Notes
1933–1945	Duck Soup	Banned under the fascist government of Benito Mussolini for poking fun at dictators and war.
1937–1945	La Grande Illusion	Banned under the fascist government of Benito Mussolini for its anti-war message.
1955	Toto and Carolina	Banned on its initial release for poking fun at the police.
1962	Jules and Jim	Banned initially for its sexual attitudes, but after protest this ban was quickly lifted.
1972–1986	Last Tango in Paris	Banned from 1972 to 1986 for being "obscene".
1982–2009	Lion of the Desert	Banned from 1982 until 2009 as it was considered damaging to the honor of the Italian Army.

== Japan ==
Date	Title	Notes
1939–1946	The Mikado	Banned until after World War II because could be construed as disrespectful towards the Emperor of Japan.
1945–1952	The Men Who Tread on the Tiger's Tail	Banned in Japan by the US occupying government for seven years, because of the "feudal values".
1976–1982	In the Realm of the Senses	Banned in Japan for its graphic sex scenes. In 1982, the court ruled in director Nagisa Ōshima's favor, but the film is still only available in a censored cut.
1969	Horrors of Malformed Men	Banned after its initial release because could be construed as disrespectful towards hibakusha.
1973	Half Human	Banned since 1973 because of controversy surrounding on-screen depictions of the burakumin.
1974	Prophecies of Nostradamus	Banned after its initial release because could be construed as disrespectful towards hibakusha.
1986–1998	Pulgasari	Banned in Japanese theaters until 1998 for "political reasons", according to the Yomiuri Shimbun.
2011	Hereafter	Withdrawn from all cinemas a few days after the 11 March 2011 earthquake and tsunami in Japan, two weeks earlier than originally planned. Warner Bros. spokesperson Satoru Otani said "the film's terrifying tsunami scenes were 'not appropriate' at this time".

== Jordan ==
Date	Title	Notes
1959	Ben-Hur	Banned from all Arab League states because actress Haya Harareet was Israeli.
2006	Borat	Banned in every Arab League country except Lebanon.
2006	The Da Vinci Code	Banned because of blasphemous content.
2022	Doctor Strange in the Multiverse of Madness	Banned because of the prominence of America Chavez, who is a lesbian character.
2022	Lightyear	Banned due to a brief lesbian kiss scene.

== Kazakhstan ==
Date	Title	Notes
2006	Borat	Banned due to jokingly accusing Kazakhstan of antisemitism and misogyny. However, the film's catchphrase, "Very nice", was later used in an official tourism campaign.
2022	Lightyear	Banned due to depictions of lesbianism.

== Kenya ==
Date	Title	Notes
2013	The Wolf of Wall Street	Banned for explicit sexual content, profanity, drug use and nudity.
2014	Stories of Our Lives	Banned because this documentary about being gay in Kenya "showed obscenity, explicit scenes of sexual activities" and promoted homosexuality.
2015	Fifty Shades of Grey	Banned due to its sexual content.
2018 (overturned)	Rafiki	Initially banned due to depictions of homosexuality. However, following public outrage, the film's director, Wanuri Kahiu, sued the Kenya Film Classification Board for banning the film. The court ruled in favour Kuhiu, effectively unbanning the film.

== Kuwait ==
Date	Title	Notes
1959	Ben-Hur	Banned from all Arab League states because actress Haya Harareet was Israeli.
1999	South Park: Bigger, Longer & Uncut	Banned for offending the Muslim Brotherhood. The TV series itself is also banned in the country. The similar series Block 13 was created as a replacement for South Park on Kuwaiti television; it ran for two seasons.
2003	Bruce Almighty	Banned for the blasphemous content.
2004	Fahrenheit 9/11	Banned for being critical of the Iraq war and being an insult to Saudi Arabia's royal family.
2006	Borat	Banned in every Arab League country except Lebanon.
2007	The Kingdom	Banned for being a "false depiction" of the 1996 Khobar Towers bombing in Saudi Arabia.
2016	Sausage Party	Refused classification for indecency.
2017	Wonder Woman	Banned due to the inclusion of Israeli actress Gal Gadot.
2017	Beauty and the Beast	Banned and withdrawn from cinemas due to homosexual references that were found to be offensive.
2020	Onward	Banned due to the film's minor reference to a lesbian relationship.
2020	Wonder Woman 1984	Banned due to the inclusion of Israeli actress Gal Gadot.
2021	Eternals	Banned due to the film's character of Phastos and his husband.
2022	Death on the Nile	Banned due to the inclusion of Israeli actress Gal Gadot.
2022	Beast	Banned for portraying Muslims as terrorists.
2022	Doctor Strange in the Multiverse of Madness	Banned due to one of the film's characters America Chavez being a lesbian.
2022	Lightyear	Banned due to a brief lesbian kiss scene.
2022	Thor: Love and Thunder	Banned to LGBT representation.
2022	Turning Red	Banned due to the explicit depictions of puberty and other mature themes.
2023	That Time I Got Reincarnated as a Slime the Movie: Scarlet Bond	The first Japanese film to be banned due to the protagonist, Rimuru Tempest, being genderless.
2023	Demon Slayer: Kimetsu no Yaiba – To the Swordsmith Village	Banned due to a scene's explicit nature where Mitsuri Kanroji, Love Hashira, takes a shower in the hot spring.
2023	Talk to Me	Banned due to the inclusion of Zoe Terakes, who is non-binary and transmasculine.
2023	Barbie	Kuwaiti ministry of information's committee on cinematic censorship censored the film because of its "ideas and beliefs that are alien to the Kuwaiti society". Also banned due to "promoting ideas and beliefs that are not in line with the cultures and values".
2023	Spider-Man: Across the Spider-Verse	Banned due to it containing frames which feature a transgender flag on which the phrase "Protect Trans Kids" is displayed.
2023	Animal	Banned due to its several sexual contents.
2024	Ghostbusters: Frozen Empire	Banned due to a "queer character".
2024	The Crow	Banned for excessive nudity
2024	Bhool Bhulaiyaa 3	Banned for mentions of homosexuality
2024	Wicked	Prior to theatrical release the film was pulled from local theatres due to "public ethics", then the ban was lifted in few days later.
2025	Snow White	Banned due to the inclusion of Israeli actress Gal Gadot.
2025	Chainsaw Man – The Movie: Reze Arc	Banned due to the swimming pool scene with Denji and Reze, which included nudity, and Reze's character modification in some other scenes. However, the scenes were removed in other Arabic countries except for Qatar.

== Kyrgyzstan ==
Date	Title	Notes
2022	Lightyear	De facto banned because films in Kyrgyzstan are distributed from Kazakhstan, which has banned the film.

== Lebanon ==
Date	Title	Notes
1959	Ben-Hur	Banned from all Arab League states because actress Haya Harareet was Israeli.
1993	Schindler's List	Banned for political reasons.
2006	The Da Vinci Code	Banned because of blasphemous content.
2008–2008	Persepolis	Banned initially after some clerics found it to be "offensive to Iran and Islam." The ban was later revoked after an outcry in Lebanese intellectual and political circles.
2008	Waltz with Bashir	The film is banned in Lebanon, with the most harsh critics saying the film depicts a vague and violent time in Lebanon's history. A movement of bloggers, among them the Lebanese Inner Circle, +961 and others have rebelled against the Lebanese government's ban of the film, and have managed to get the film seen by local Lebanese critics, in defiance of their government's request on banning it. The film was privately screened in January 2009 in Beirut in front of 90 people. Since then, many screenings have taken place. Unofficial copies are also available in the country.
2010	Chou sar?	The General Security Department did not state the reason behind banning the documentary, which covered the Lebanese Civil War.
2011	Beirut Hotel	Banned for political reasons.
2011	Shame	
2012	Fetih 1453	Banned for being offensive to Christianity.
2012	The Attack	Banned because the director, Ziad Doueiri, filmed in Israel.
2013	Too Much Love Will Kill You	Banned for being blasphemous and provocative.
2013	I Offered You Pleasure	The film tackles issues of sexual discrimination and the oppression of social traditions.
2013	Stranger By The Lake	The film shows a romantic relationship between two men.
2015	Wasp	The film centers around a gay couple.
2015	I Say Dust	Banned because of a same-sex kiss.
2015	In This Land Lay Graves of Mine	This film tackles fears of communities about demographic partition stemming from massacres and displacements perpetrated along sectarian lines during the Lebanese Civil War. It was banned for "stimulating sectarian and partisan zealotries and disturbing civil peace".
2016	Personal Affairs	Produced by an Israeli company and filmed in Israel.
2017	The Beach House	This film by Roy Dib, which tells the story of a late-night dinner party in which two sisters play host to an old friend and his male companion, was banned due to the revelation that the two male characters were lovers.
2017–2017	Mawlana	A critique of corruption and fundamentalism. Its ban was lifted after parts of the film were cut out.
2017	Wonder Woman	Banned because it casts the Israeli actress Gal Gadot.
2017	Panoptic	This documentary was banned in Lebanon due to the director Rana Eid refusing to remove a single sentence and any military presence, as well for being critical of the Lebanese military.
2017	Justice League	Banned because it casts the Israeli actress Gal Gadot.
2017	Jungle	Banned because it tells the true story of a former Israeli navy serviceman.
2018	The Nun	Banned because it is "offensive to Christianity".
2022	Death on the Nile	Banned because it casts the Israeli actress Gal Gadot.
2022	Minions: The Rise of Gru	While no reason was given, it was supposedly banned for portraying two minions kissing in the film, and a nun attempting to use nunchucks.
2022	Lightyear	Banned because of a same-sex kiss.
2023	Scream VI	Banned because of a same-sex kiss between the two openly queer couple Mindy Meeks-Martin and Anika Kayoko.
2023	Spider-Man: Across the Spider-Verse	No reason was given for the ban, but it may have been because a transgender flag, which had the slogan "Protect Trans Kids" on it, was briefly shown on Gwen's bedroom wall.
2025	Snow White	Banned because it casts the Israeli actress Gal Gadot.

== Libya ==
Date	Title	Notes
1959	Ben-Hur	Banned from all Arab League states because actress Haya Harareet was Israeli.
2006	Borat	Banned in every Arab League country except Lebanon.

== Macau ==
Date	Title	Notes
2017–present	All Winnie-the-Pooh films	Films featuring Winnie-the-Pooh are banned from mainland China, including the horror parody films, Winnie-the-Pooh: Blood and Honey and its sequel.

== Maldives ==
Date	Title	Notes
1956	The Ten Commandments	This film was banned due to its depiction of Moses, as per Islamic custom, prophets (such as Moses) and messengers of God cannot be portrayed in any medium.
1999	The Prince of Egypt	Banned due to the Ministry of Islamic Affairs (then known as the Supreme Council of Islamic Affairs) taking offence to the depiction of Moses in the film.
2012	Innocence of Muslims	Banned due to being blasphemous and critical of Islam.

== Malta ==
Date	Title	Notes
1972–2000	A Clockwork Orange	Banned from 1972 until 2000.
1977	Raid on Entebbe	Prime Minister Dom Mintoff personally banned the screening of the film claiming the film promotes violence against an independent nation. Allegedly banned on a personal request from Libyan Leader Muammar Gaddafi.
1989	The Last Temptation of Christ	Banned for blasphemous content. The video release was also withdrawn.

== Mauritania ==
Date	Title	Notes
1959	Ben-Hur	Banned from all Arab League states because actress Haya Harareet was Israeli.
2006	Borat	Banned in every Arab League country except Lebanon.

== Mexico ==
Date	Title	Notes
1937	La mancha de sangre	Banned due to the portrayal of sex on screen, and was not seen until after 6 years of its original release.
1960	La sombra del caudillo	Based on the 1929 novel by Martín Luis Guzmán, the film was banned for 30 years due to its portrayal of revolutionary heroes Álvaro Obregón and Plutarco Elías Calles.
1968	Fando y Lis	This film was initially banned due to a full-scale riot caused by its premiere at the 1968 Acapulco Film Festival breaking out Fando y Lis was shown in New York's 5th Avenue Cinema where it was dubbed, re-edited and cut by 13 minutes. It was shown in London in February 1971, re-titled as Tar Babies, running 98 minutes. It was not released in Mexico until July 1972.
1969	Santo en el tesoro de Drácula	This film starring the legendary wrestler El Santo had two versions shot: one version rated R7, which debuted in 1968; and an 18 rated version known as El vampiro y el sexo, which could not be seen until 2011, screened on a vampire films selected by Guillermo del Toro, during the International Guadalajara International Film Festival. However, the premiere of this version was cancelled due to conflicts of rights between the productor's family and wrestler El Hijo Del Santo, who wanted as well to avoid that the film would tarnish his father's image.
1976	Canoa	Based on a true story, it was banned due to the portrayal of the government.
1978	El lugar sin límites	Due to its representation of sexuality, violence and social marginalization, the film faced imposed and mandated cuts, as well as restricted distribution.
1988	The Last Temptation of Christ	Banned for blasphemic themes.The film was finally released in Mexican theatres in 2004.
1989	Rojo Amanecer	Banned due to its portrayal of the 1968 student massacre in Tlatelolco.

== Morocco ==
Date	Title	Notes
1959	Ben-Hur	Banned from all Arab League states because actress Haya Harareet was Israeli.
2006	Borat	Banned in every Arab League country except Lebanon.

== Myanmar ==
Date	Title	Notes
2007	The Simpsons Movie	Banned over the "juxtaposition of the colors yellow and red", which is seen as support for rebel groups.
2008	Rambo	Banned for negative portrayals of Burmese soldiers.

== Netherlands ==
Date	Title	Notes
1932	Scram!	Banned on its initial release because of a scene where Laurel and Hardy sit on a bed with a woman to whom they were not married. Censors felt this was "indecent". Today the film is not banned.
2010	Maladolescenza	The uncut version was banned since 25 March 2010 by the court of Alkmaar, which classified several scenes as child pornography. The decision therefore means that possession, distribution and knowingly gaining access to the film is prohibited.

== New Zealand ==
Date	Title	Notes
1975–1992	Salò, or the 120 Days of Sodom	Banned on its initial release, but lifted after seventeen years.
1976–1985	Tarzoon: Shame of the Jungle	Banned due to content that would be contrary to public decency and undesirable to public interest. (VHS release was later approved at R16)
1980, 2006-2026	Cannibal Holocaust	Banned due to its extremely violent content and actual on-screen killings of animals (also refused release in 2006), but this ban was lifted in 2026.
1981–1988	Mad Max	Banned in 1979 because of a graphic violent death. (VHS release was later approved at R18)
1986, 1995	Pink Flamingos	A home video VHS release with cuts made was rated R18 in 1985. An uncut home video release in 1986 was rated "R" and limited to trade screenings only. Another uncut home video release in 1995 with bonus material was also rated "R" and limited to the importer only. The film was "Refused Classification" (not "Objectionable") in 2024 for blu-ray. This is because the submission process was not completed, not because of the content itself. It is an offense in New Zealand for anyone to import, possess or distribute the uncut version of this film, unless granted special permission from the OFLC to do so.
2004–2021	Puni Puni Poemy	Banned on the grounds that it "tends to promote and support the exploitation of children and young persons for sexual purposes, and to a lesser extent, the use of sexual coercion to compel persons to submit to sexual conduct", and for high-impact violence and cruelty. In 2021 the Office reconsidered the series and classified it R16.
2005	Love Camp 7	Although an edited VHS version had been classified R18 in 1996, the unedited DVD version was banned in 2005 for "exploit[ing] the nudity of women and present[ing] real and tragic events in a flippant and offensive way."
2005	Vase de Noces	Banned because the film "promotes and supports bestiality". As of 2017, it is still banned.
2007	Nekromantik 2	Banned because "the publication promotes and supports sexual conduct with or upon the body of a dead person". The OFLC also ruled that parts of the additional material featured on the DVD release tried to normalise necrophilia.
2007–2008	Hostel: Part II	Banned due to one scene that "fuses an act of extreme violence with sexual gratification". This scene's inclusion led to the film being classified as objectionable under s3(2)(f) of the Films, Videos, and Publications Classification Act 1993 on the grounds that it "tend[s] to promote and support acts of torture and the infliction of extreme violence and extreme cruelty", thus making it illegal for the film to be displayed publicly. Sony Pictures initially refused to remove the scene. However, on 29 January 2008, after the scene was excised, the film was rated R18 for "torture and sadistic violence".
2010	I Spit on Your Grave (2010 remake)	Banned "because it tends to promote and support the use of violence to compel any person to submit to sexual conduct".
2010-2023	Ikki Tousen: Dragon Destiny	Banned on the grounds of the series' violent and sexual scenes. Due to the reaction from New Zealand film authorities, distributor Madman Entertainment chose not to release the remaining volumes there. In 2023 the Office reconsidered the series and classified it R18.
2011	Megan Is Missing	Banned for its sexual violence involving young people.
2011	The Human Centipede 2 (Full Sequence)	Banned due to its gore, violence and sexually explicit content.
2012	A Serbian Film	Banned on 25 May 2012, due to "objectionable content" (offensive depictions of sexual violence, pedophilia, extreme violence, necrophilia and/or other content that is offensive and abhorrent)
2013	Maniac	Banned from theatrical and home video release; the OFLC felt that "the tacit invitation to enjoy cruel and violent behavior through its first-person portrayal and packaging as entertainment is likely to lead to an erosion of empathy for some viewers".
2013	I Spit on Your Grave 2	Banned "because it tends to promote and support the use of violence to compel any person to submit to sexual conduct".
2016	Cat Sick Blues	Banned because of a scene in which a woman is orally raped to death. The distributor refused to remove the scene from the film.

== Nigeria ==
Date	Title	Notes
2009	District 9	Banned due to accusations of being xenophobic and racist towards Nigerians.

== North Korea ==
Date	Title	Notes
1948–present	All foreign films	Several reports have stated that North Korea bans all foreign films, as well as almost all foreign products, including all foreign media, regardless of content. There have been some exemptions to this rule. North Korean leader Kim Jong Il reportedly owned a collection of around 15,000 films, many of which were from overseas. According to Nick Romano of Vanity Fair, during Kim Il Sung's reign of North Korea, "[Kim Jong Il] even established an underground circuit of bootleg films, as North Koreans weren't allowed to watch most international releases". The British film Bend It Like Beckham was broadcast on North Korean state television on 26 December 2010, to celebrate foreign relations between the two nations; the film contains significant sub-plots about religion and homosexuality, but was edited down to half its original runtime for the broadcast. In 2015, the British Film Institute reported that 108 films from outside of North Korea had been screened at that year's Pyongyang International Film Festival, but none were from South Korea, Japan, or the United States.
1986	Pulgasari	The film was banned under the orders of Kim Jong Il after on its director, Shin Sang-ok, escaped captivity in North Korea alongside his wife Choi Eun-hee in March 1986. As of 2015, it is still banned theatrically.

== Norway ==
Date	Title	Notes
1964–1971	491	Banned due to homosexual themes; a censored version was later released.
1972	Pink Flamingos	Banned on its initial release until the 1980s.
1974–1997	The Texas Chain Saw Massacre	Banned due to high impact scary violence. Ban lifted in 1997 and re-released uncut with an 18 (Adults only) rating.
1979–1980	Monty Python's Life of Brian	Banned due to jokes deemed offensive to religious people. In Sweden the film was allowed for release and even screened with the tagline "The film so funny that it got banned in Norway". In 1980 the Norwegian ban was lifted.
1987	Nekromantik	Banned outright by the Norwegian Media Authority due to outrageous, offensive & abhorrent content (Necrophilia, extreme violence, animal cruelty, and/or other material that is disgusting & abhorrent).
1998	Kite	Banned due to a graphic scene of sexual assault on a minor.
2009	Ichi The Killer	Banned due to high impact violence and cruelty. In January 2009, The Norwegian Media Authority classified the film as "Rejected" and banned the film outright in Norway after the government learned of an incident at the Stockholm Film Festival where two people both vomited and fainted while watching the film. The film remains strictly prohibited in Norway.
2011	A Serbian Film	Banned due to violation of criminal law sections 204a and 382 which deal with the sexual representation of children and extreme violence. An edited version of the film was eventually passed with an 18 rating.

== Oman ==
Date	Title	Notes
1959	Ben-Hur	Banned from all Arab League states because actress Haya Harareet was Israeli.
2006	Borat	Banned in every Arab League country except Lebanon.
2020	Onward	Banned due to referencing to a lesbian relationship
2021	Eternals	Banned due to the film's character of Phastos and his husband.
2022	Lightyear	Banned due to a brief lesbian kiss scene.
2023	Spider-Man: Across the Spider-Verse	Banned due to it containing frames which feature a transgender flag on which the phrase "Protect Trans Kids" is displayed.
2023	Barbie	Banned due to "promoting ideas and beliefs that are not in line with the cultures and values".
2024	The Crow	Banned for excessive nudity

== Organisation of Islamic Cooperation ==
Date	Title	Notes
2022	Lightyear	The film was banned from distribution in certain OIC member states which include Turkey, Egypt, Indonesia, Lebanon, Kuwait, Malaysia, Saudi Arabia, United Arab Emirates and few others, due to a scene featuring same-sex kiss between Uzo Aduba's female character Alisha Hawthorne and her partner. The People's Republic of China, not an OIC member but a fellow SCO member with Pakistan, also requested that the scene in question be removed. The scene was initially cut from the film in mid-March 2022, but following, Disney CEO Bob Chapek's controversial opposition to Florida's Parental Rights in Education bill and the internal polarizing uproar it caused within Disney, the scene was reinstated. Speaking to Variety's Angelique Jackson, Chris Evans had stated about the scene saying: "I've been asked the question a few times — it's nice, and it's wonderful, it makes me happy. It's tough to not be a little frustrated that it even has to be a topic of discussion [...] The goal is that we can get to a point where it is the norm, and that this doesn't have to be some uncharted waters, that eventually this is just the way it is. That representation across the board is how we make films."

== Pakistan ==
Date	Title	Notes
1980	The Blood of Hussain	Banned by General Zia ul-Haq, after he seized power in a coup de état in 1977, as the film portrays a fictional military coup in an unfavourable light.
2006	The Da Vinci Code	Banned because of blasphemous content.
2012	Agent Vinod	Banned by the Central Board of Film Censors of Pakistan, for containing various controversial references to the Pakistani spy agency Inter-Services Intelligence.
2016	Maalik	Banned by the Government of Pakistan.
2016	Sarabjit	Banned because of blasphemous content and excessive controversial depictions.
2023	Barbie	Initially banned in Punjab due to it containing objectionable content but it was rescinded.

== Papua New Guinea ==
Date	Title	Notes
2015	Fifty Shades of Grey	Banned due to sexual content.
2016	The Opposition	Also pulled from the Papua New Guinea Human Rights Film Festival. The film follows Joe Moses as he struggles to save his community from policemen wielding machetes and guns descending on the Paga Hill Settlement in Papua New Guinea to bulldoze their houses to the ground.

== Palestine ==
Date	Title	Notes
1959	Ben-Hur	Banned from all Arab League states because actress Haya Harareet was Israeli.
2006	Borat	Banned in every Arab League country except Lebanon.
2022	Lightyear	Banned due to a brief lesbian kiss scene.

== Paraguay ==
Date	Title	Notes
1940	The Great Dictator	Banned under the military dictatorship of Higinio Morínigo.
1971	Sacco & Vanzetti	Banned under the military dictatorship of Alfredo Stroessner for "encouraging Communism".
1973	State of Siege	Banned under the military dictatorship of Alfredo Stroessner.
1979	The Deer Hunter	Banned under the military dictatorship of Alfredo Stroessner for "danger of being misunderstood".

== Peru ==
Date	Title	Notes
1965	Taita Cristo	This film, an Argentina-Peru coproduction, which revolves around the sufferance of a village in Northern Peru face to a drought had its screening banned in Lima "for including scenes which offended the human dignity, moral values and the Catholic creed".
1973	Runan Caycu	This film, produced by the National System of Support to Social Mobilization, about the struggles of the Cuzco peasants movement against the gamonales and hacendados, seen by the eyes of communal leader Saturnino Huillca, showing also the role and violent participation the Armed Forces had during the struggle preceding the Peruvian Agrarian Reform, was censored by the Central Information Office and never got its premiere in Peru. It could only be shown in the alternative and clandestine circuit of trade unions and cineclubs. Despite this, the film won the Silver Dove at the 1973 International Documentary Film Festival in Leipzig.

== Poland ==
Date	Title	Notes
1930	All Quiet on the Western Front	Banned because censors felt it was "pro-German". Ironically, it was also banned in Nazi Germany for being "anti-German".
1945	The Wind from the East	Banned due to anti-Polish sentiment and historical distortions of the Soviet invasion of Poland.
1946	Australia Marches with Britain	Banned without a reason given.
1946	Men of Timor	Banned without a reason given.
1967–1985	Ręce do góry (Hands Up!)	Banned under the Communist government for 18 years for depicting the Stalinist era. Its director, Jerzy Skolimowski, was so outraged he left his country and moved to the West.
1972	Diabeł (The Devil)	Banned under the Communist government because of its political anti-war theme.
1973–1981	Opowieść o człowieku, który wykonał 552% normy (A Story of a Man Who Filled 552% of the Quota)	Banned under the Communist government for its depiction of the Stalinist past. It was only released after the director, Wojciech Wiszniewski, died in 1981.
1975–1981	Wanda Gościmska. Włókniarka (Wanda Gościmińska. A Weaver)	Banned under the Communist government for its depiction of the Stalinist past. It was only released after the director, Wojciech Wiszniewski, died in 1981.
1976–1980	Spokój (The Calm)	Banned under the Communist government for four years because the plot is about a strike. (Note: Kieślowski claimed that the film "had nothing to do with politics. It simply tells the story of a man who wants very little and can't get it.") The film was finally shown on Polish television for the first time on 19 September 1980. In 1981, The Calm received the Polish Film Festival Special Jury Prize.
1976–1981	Elementarz (The Primer)	Banned under the Communist government for its depiction of the Stalinist past. It was only released after the director, Wojciech Wiszniewski, died in 1981.
1977–1981	Indeks. Życie i twórczość Józefa M. (The Index)	Banned under the Communist government for four years, because it depicted the 1968 protests.
1981	Był Jazz (There was Jazz)	Banned by the Communist government.
1981	Człowiek z żelaza (Man of Iron)	Banned under the Communist government for its political criticism and for depicting the labour union Solidarity.
1981	Gorączka (Fever)	Banned by the Communist government, because of its brutally realistic portrayal of the occupying Soviet forces.
1981	Jak żyć (How to Live)	Banned twice in one year by the Communist government.
1981	Kobieta Samotna (A Lonely Woman)	Banned by the Communist government for its political criticism.
1981–1983	Wojna światów – następne stulecie (The War of the Worlds: Next Century)	Banned under the Communist government for depicting a futuristic society which showed parallels with the political situation of Poland at that time. It remained banned until 1983.
1981–1984	Wahadełko (Shilly Shally) (Shilly Shally)	Banned under the Communist government for three years, because the story is set during the Stalinist era.
1981–1984	Dreszcze (Shivers)	Banned by the Communist government. The film is a satirical story about a teenager imprisoned at an indoctrination camp.
1981–1987	Wielki bieg (The Big Run, also translated as The Big Race)	Banned under the Communist government for six years for its political criticism.
1981–1987	Blind Chance	Banned by the Communist government because of one storyline where Communism in Poland is overthrown.
1981–1988	Kobieta Samotna (A Lonely Woman, also translated as A Woman Alone)	Banned under the Communist government for its political criticism. It remained banned for seven years, until 1988.
1982–1987	Matka Królów (The Mother of Kings)	Banned under the Communist government without even being released for its political criticism. It remained banned for five years, until 1987.
1982–1989	Przesłuchanie (Interrogation)	Banned under the Communist government for seven years because of its criticism of Communism. Despite the film's controversial initial reception and subsequent banning, it garnered a cult fanbase through the circulation of illegally taped VHS copies, which director Ryszard Bugajski secretly helped to leak out to the general public.
1983–1988	Niedzielne igraszki (Sunday Pranks)	Banned under the Communist government for five years.
2008	Necrobusiness	The film was banned on request of Łodzian funeral entrepreneurs due to depiction of the "skin hunters" scandal, focusing on Łodzian medics killing patients with pancuronium to get paid by Łodzian funeral agencies. Another supposed reason for the film's banning was depiction of Poland in a bad light.

== Portugal ==
Date	Title	Notes
1970	Catch-22	Banned under the Marcelo Caetano dictatorship for a scene depicting a character sitting naked in a tree, though the fact that the film satirizes the military may also have been a factor.
1972–1974	Last Tango in Paris	Banned under Marcelo Caetano's dictatorship for its strong sexual content. The ban was lifted after the Carnation Revolution in 1974.

== Qatar ==
Date	Title	Notes
1959	Ben-Hur	Banned from all Arab League states because actress Haya Harareet was Israeli.
2003	Bruce Almighty	Banned for the blasphemous content.
2006	Borat	Banned in every Arab League country except Lebanon.
2014	Noah	Banned for depicting the prophets.
2017	Wonder Woman	Banned because it features Israeli actress Gal Gadot.
2020	Onward	Banned due to the film's minor reference to a lesbian relationship.
2021	Eternals	Banned due to the film's character of Phastos and his husband.
2022	Doctor Strange in the Multiverse of Madness	Banned due to the film portraying a gay character.
2022	Lightyear	Banned due to a brief lesbian kiss scene.
2023	Demon Slayer: Kimetsu no Yaiba – To the Swordsmith Village	The first Japanese film to be banned due to a scene's explicit nature where Mitsuri Kanroji, Love Hashira, takes a shower in the hot spring.
2023	Spider-Man: Across the Spider-Verse	Banned due to it containing frames which feature a transgender flag on which the phrase "Protect Trans Kids" is displayed.
2023	Barbie	The film was banned for reasons that were not specified. It was likely banned due to undermining public morals.
2024	The Crow	Banned for excessive nudity.

== Romania ==
Date	Title	Notes
1981–1990	Carnival Scenes	Banned from the personal order of Nicolae Ceaușescu due to violent content.
2008	Saw IV	Banned upon release. Later reclassified and prohibited only to minors.
2009	Milk	Banned upon release. Later reclassified and prohibited only to under-15s.
2014	Nymphomaniac: Vol. II	Classified by the National Cinema Center's rating commission as a film "forbidden to minors under 18 and banned from public screening" due to explicit content. After outrage at decision in mass media and on social networking websites, the commission allowed cinemas to run the film for audiences over 18.

== Russia ==
Date	Title	Notes
1936	Prometheus	Banned in Russia for promoting Ukrainian nationalism.
1939–1990	Gone with the Wind	Banned in the Soviet Union for unknown reasons.
1966	Andrei Rublev	Banned in Russia for its themes of artistic freedom, religion, political ambiguity, autodidacticism, and the making of art under a repressive regime. Because of this, it was not released domestically for years after it was completed, except for a single 1966 screening in Moscow.
1967–1987	Commissar	Released September 1967. Banned for its depictions of Jews. The government saw Jews as a fifth column, covert Zionists and potential traitors to the Soviet Motherland, which became more pronounced after the Six-Day War. Representations of Jews in films were generally suppressed in this era. The ban was lifted in 1987.
1968–1987	The Glass Harmonica	Banned by the Soviet government for its surrealist animation and perceived anti-authoritarian symbolism.
1968	Brief Encounters	Banned by the Communist government.
1971	The Long Farewell	Banned by the Communist government for its negative view of a mother-son relationship.
1972–1990	The Godfather	Banned by the Communist government because it romanticized the criminal world. In 1990, the ban was lifted.
1977–1990	All Star Wars films	Banned by the Soviet government. In 1990, the ban was lifted.
1984	Repentance	Banned for its semi-allegorical critique of Stalinism.
2006	Borat	Banned for being "offensive".
2014	The Interview	Banned to avoid political provocations.
2018	The Death of Stalin	Banned by the Ministry of Culture for being offensive and extremist.
2019	Jojo Rabbit	Banned for portraying Adolf Hitler and the Nazi Party in a comedic light.
2019	Mr. Jones	The film shows the facts of the Holodomor and mass political repressions against Ukrainians, which the Soviet and later Russian authorities officially deny. The screening in Moscow was interrupted several times by FSB. Therefore, actually, the film is banned in Russia
2022	The Green Elephant (1999)	Banned on 6 May 2022 for graphic violence.
2023	Holy Spider	Released in Russian cinemas for a few days and was soon banned for reasons unclear. The Russian Ministry of Culture stated that the film "contain[ed] information whose dissemination is prohibited by the legislation of the Russian Federation." The director Ali Abbasi believes the ban was related to Iran's military support for Russia in the Russo-Ukrainian War.
2023	Непосредственно Каха. Другой фильм (Directly Kakha. Another Movie)	Banned three months after the premiere due to rape excuse and victim blaming. The film was also removed from streaming services.
2023	Barbie	Banned due to 'not corresponding to traditional values'
2023	Oppenheimer	Banned due to 'not corresponding to traditional values'
2023	Fairytale	Banned in Russia

== Samoa ==
Date	Title	Notes
2009	Angels & Demons	Banned due to the censor describing the film as "critical of the Catholic Church".
2006	The Da Vinci Code	Banned outright after church leaders watching a pre-release showing filed a complaint with film censors.
2009	The Cell 2	Banned due to violent content.
2009	Milk	Banned, originally without being given a reason. Later, it was explained that the censors deemed it "inappropriate and contradictory to Christian beliefs and Samoan culture": "In the movie itself it is trying to promote the human rights of gays." The sex scenes in particular were considered inappropriate by the Samoan Censor Board.
2009	National Lampoon's Van Wilder: Freshman Year	Banned in 2009.
2019	Rocketman	Banned for its depictions of gay sex.

== Saudi Arabia ==
Date	Title	Notes
1959	Ben-Hur	Banned from all Arab League states because actress Haya Harareet was Israeli.
1962, 1967	Calypso Cat and Jerry, Jerry, Quiet Contrary	Both short films are banned as inappropriate.
2001–2018	All Harry Potter films	Banned for alleged occultism and satanism propaganda. In 2018, the ban was lifted.
2003	Bruce Almighty	Banned for the blasphemous content and depiction of God.
2004	Fahrenheit 9/11	Banned for being critical of the Iraq war and being an insult to Saudi Arabia's royal family.
2006	Borat	Banned in every Arab League country except Lebanon.
2013	King of the Sands	Banned for depicting the Saudi Arabia country founder Ibn Saud.
2014	Noah	Banned for depicting the prophets.
2020	Onward	Banned due to the film's minor reference to a lesbian relationship.
2021	Bell Bottom	Banned for allegedly tampering with historical facts.
2021	Eternals	Banned due to the film's character of Phastos and his husband.
2022	West Side Story	Reportedly banned to the film's portrayal of a transgender character.
2022	Lightyear	Banned due to a brief lesbian kiss scene.
2022	Everything Everywhere All at Once	Banned due to the film's depiction of an openly gay character and a lesbian couple.
2022	Doctor Strange in the Multiverse of Madness	Banned due to the film's character America Chavez being a lesbian.
2022	Sita Ramam	Unknown, likely banned for hurting religious sentiments.
2023	Demon Slayer: Kimetsu no Yaiba – To the Swordsmith Village	The first Japanese film to be banned due to a scene's explicit nature where Mitsuri Kanroji, Love Hashira, takes a shower in the hot spring. The ban was lifted when Ufotable allows to censor the mentioned scene.
2024	Bhool Bhulaiyaa 3	Banned because of homosexual references
2024	Singham Again	Banned due to religious conflicts

== Senegal ==
Date	Title	Notes
1977	Ceddo	Banned for its presentation of the conflicts between Islamic and Christian religions and ethnic and traditional beliefs. According to another account reported in The New York Times in 1978, the banning was not "because of any religious sensitivity, but because the director, Ousmane Sembène insists on spelling 'ceddo' with two d's while the Senegalese Government insists it be spelled with one."
1988	Camp de Thiaroye	Banned for criticizing the colonial system.

== Solomon Islands ==
Date	Title	Notes
2006	The Da Vinci Code	Banned because Prime Minister Manasseh Sogavare stated that the film "undermines the very roots of Christianity in Solomon Islands."

== Somalia ==
Date	Title	Notes
1959	Ben-Hur	Banned from all Arab League states because actress Haya Harareet was Israeli.
2006	Borat	Banned in every Arab League country except Lebanon.

== South Africa ==
Date	Title	Notes
1910	The Johnson-Jeffries Fight	Banned because the footage depicted the black boxer Jack Johnson defeating the white boxer James J. Jeffries, which had already inspired race riots in the American South.
1964	Zulu	Banned under the apartheid regime from screening to black South Africans, because it depicts a Zulu uprising in the 19th century. Whites were allowed to see it in their own segregated cinemas.
1971–1984	A Clockwork Orange	Banned under the apartheid regime for 13 years, then released with one cut and only made available to people over the age of 21.
1973	The Last Picture Show	Banned under the apartheid regime for over a decade for its explicit sexual content.
1975	The Rocky Horror Picture Show	Banned under the apartheid regime until the 1990s for the LGBT themes and adult situations.
1978	Up in Smoke	Banned under the apartheid regime because it "might encourage the impressionable youth of South Africa to take up marijuana smoking".
1978–1983	Pretty Baby	Banned under the apartheid regime until 1983.
1979	Monty Python's Life of Brian	Banned under the apartheid regime because of blasphemous content.
1980	Cruising	Banned under the apartheid regime on its initial release.
1988	Mapantsula	Banned under the apartheid regime for criticism of apartheid.
1995–1997	Kids	Banned for two years and only unbanned in 1997 on appeal with a no-under 16 age restriction.
2013	Of Good Report	Banned in the entire country because it has a storyline where older men abuse young girls, with scenes deemed "child pornography" according to the censors.

== South Korea ==
Date	Title	Notes
1971	A Clockwork Orange	Banned due to depictions of violence and gang rape. Has been lifted since.
1973	Last Tango in Paris	Banned for its strong sexual content.
1975–1981	Ban Geum-ryeon	Banned for six years, was released in South Korea with 40 minutes cut.
1979	Apocalypse Now	Banned under South Korean President Park Chung Hee's regime, the importation of the film was on hold because of its anti-war theme.
1992	Braindead	Banned for gory violence.

== Spain ==
Date	Title	Notes
1927–1975	Battleship Potemkin	Banned under the regime of Francisco Franco out of fear of inciting a Communist revolution.
1940	El crucero Baleares (The Baleares Cruiser)	This film revolving around the Francoist heavy cruiser Baleares was withheld from being premiered by order of the then Ministry of the Navy due to its poor cinematographic quality, granting only a private screening.
1956	La bandera negra (The Black Flag)	First film of the filmmaker Amando de Ossorio, who later would be specialised in the horror genre. It was a plea against death penalty, which was then legal in Spain, with the performance of only one actor, José María Seoane. It was filmed without official authorisation, which was the reason why the censors fined it and submitted it to several cuts, eventually not making it to being distributed.
1957–1986	Paths of Glory	Banned under Franco's regime for its "anti-military" themes.
1957	Miracles of Thursday	This film revolves around a group of people from a forgotten town deciding to fake and represent a miracle, in order to attract tourism to their town. A screenplay by Luis García Berlanga, which resulted into him clashing with the Francoist censors.
1960	Psycho	The Francoist censors cut several shots from the scene of the shower murdering in order to hide Janet Leigh's body nudity.
1960–1975	La Dolce Vita	Banned under the regime of Francisco Franco.
1961–1977	Viridiana	Banned under Franco's regime, although the Film Institute of Spain approved the film's submission to the Cannes Film Festival. After the Catholic Church expressed its indignation, the head of the Film Institute was fired and the film was banned for sixteen years.
1964	El extraño viaje	Directed by Fernando Fernán Gómez, based on an idea from Luis García Berlanga, which was based on a real story of two brothers from Haro, La Rioja. The censorship gave this film the most restrictive rating, which did not even grant the right to debut, delaying approximately 5 years to have a minimal distribution.
1964	Behold a Pale Horse	Banned under the regime of Francisco Franco. According to director Fred Zinneman, the reason of the ban was due to the film's portrayal of the Spanish Civil Guard as "heavies".
1968	Algo amargo en la boca (Something Bitter Tasting)	One of the first films of the later famed and polemic Eloy de la Iglesia, who saw how censorship provoked some alterations in the result.
1969	The House That Screamed	Narciso Ibáñez Serrador's cinema debut suffered some cuts in its film imposed by the censors. These affected a sequence where the lesbianism of the characters was implied, as well as some plans taken in the showers scene. This material was not kept, although some still pictures taken during the filming. In a 2002 DVD edition, the film was rated as Not recommended for people under 13 years.
1970	Vampyros Lesbos	This film by Jesús Franco with a mostly German production crew, was butchered at the time by the Spanish censorship, which reduced it to a version lasting less than 80 minutes.
1972	The Getaway	During the film's theatrical debut, the censorship imposed, a message after the films epilogue, that stated that the characters played by Steve McQueen and Ali MacGraw were arrested in Mexico. This tag was removed in later home video versions and televised versions.
1973	Al otro lado del espejo (At the other side of the mirror)	This project by Jesús Franco was initially banned by the Ministry of Information and Tourism, eventually completed four years after. Anyway, it debuted in Spain in an 80-minute-long cut, rendering the development moot, which was something usual in Spain at the time of co-productions and double versions for the domestic market and the exports.
1977	¿Y ahora qué, señor fiscal? (And now what, Mr. Prosecutor?)	This film is an adaptation by León Klimowsky from an original screenplay by Martín Vigil. The censors forced a change to the pre-production title, Orgasmo sobre una muerta (Orgasm over a Dead Woman), opting to retain the book's title.
1977	¡Votad, votad, malditos! (Vote, vote, you goddamn!)	This short film in the style of a documentary and a reportage about the pre-electoral climate in Barcelona during Spain's first elections after the fall of the Francoist regime, was banned for questioning the official reports of the Transition.
1979	The Crime of Cuenca	Based on a real fact, the official organs banned the film reiteratingly for its depiction of the Civil Guard. Shown in some film festivals, It was not shown in commercial cinemas in Spain until 1981.
1980–1985	Rocío	This documentary film was the first film to be seized by court order in Spain in 1981, due to the inclusion of testimonies from townsfolk from Almonte pointing José María Reales Carrasco, the town's mayor during the dictatorship of Primo de Rivera and founder of the rociera brotherhood in Jerez de la Frontera (established in 1932 against the "contempt of the Virgin of El Rocío committed by the Second Spanish Republic"), as responsible of the repression in the town, which ended with 100 killings (99 men and one woman), which resulted into a lawsuit for libel, insult against the Catholic religion and slander filed by the sons of Reales against the director Fernando Ruiz Vergara. As a result, a trial court from Sevilla banned the showing of the tape on 8 April 1981 in Cádiz, Huelva and Sevilla, with the ban extending two months later. Ruiz Vergara was arrested for two months and had to pay 50.000 pesetas as a fine and a compensation of 10 million pesetas in concept of civil responsibility for serious insult against José María Reales, as well had to cut any scene mentioning him. The film was unbanned in 1985 with said scenes cut.
1980	The Exterminator	This film was rated "S" due to extreme violence, this is an action film about revenge whose protagonist is a Vietnam War veteran.
1981	La Petición (The Engagement Party)	Banned initially, but finally released under media pressure to reconsider its artistic merit. The film is about a woman involved in sadistic and ultimately fatal sexual relationships with men.
2009	Saw VI	Banned from regular, non-adult cinemas because of the "X" rating. A cut version was released.
2010	A Serbian Film	Banned due to extreme violence (contains a lot of sexually violent content).
2010	La mula	This film had its age rating suspended and the harmful qualification for the public was declared by the Ministry of Culture under the mandate of the Minister Ángeles González-Sinde and the PSOE government, which bans its screening. On 14 November 2012 came out the ruling through which the pretensions of the Ministry of Culture were unestimated. That same month, the ICAA issued the rating certification and granted the Spanish nationality to the film.

== Sri Lanka ==
Date	Title	Notes
1975	Salò, or the 120 Days of Sodom	Banned due to graphic violence and nudity.
2006	Aksharaya (Letter of Fire)	Banned for dealing with issues of incest, murder, and rape.
2006	The Da Vinci Code	Banned for religiously sensitive themes.
2021	Carnal Monsters	Banned graphic nudity and violence.
2021	Necro Lesbians (Nekrology)	Banned for dealing with issues of necrophilia and rape.

== Sudan ==
Date	Title	Notes
1959	Ben-Hur	Banned from all Arab League states because actress Haya Harareet was Israeli.
2006	Borat	Banned in every Arab League country except Lebanon.

== Sweden ==
Date	Title	Notes
1969	I Am Curious (Yellow)	Banned because of pornography, but after a court case it was allowed.
1974–2001	The Texas Chain Saw Massacre	Banned due to high gore violence and cruelty. Ban lifted in 2001.
1981–2005	Mad Max	Banned because of violent content. Ban lifted in 2005.
1983	Hell of the Living Dead	Released uncut on DVD in the mid-2000s.
1984–2005	Tenebre	Banned because of high impact scary violence. Re-released in an uncut version in 2005.
1985	Return of the Living Dead	Although its status remains unclear(?) the first two sequels have been released on DVD.
1997	Texas Chainsaw Massacre: The Next Generation	Banned because of high impact scary violence and cruelty. Sony Pictures later released the film on DVD.

== Switzerland ==
Date	Title	Notes
1957–1970	Paths of Glory	Banned for its critical depiction of the French army during World War I.
1968–1975	Rondo	Banned for its critical look at the Swiss prison system, implying that for the Swiss incarceration as a form of punishment and means of deterrence is more important than integrating released prisoners back into society.

== Syria ==
Date	Title	Notes
1959	Ben-Hur	Banned from all Arab League states because actress Haya Harareet was Israeli.
1960	Exodus	Banned due to actor Paul Newman's "material support for Zionism and Israel".
2006	Borat	Banned in every Arab League country except Lebanon.
2006	The Da Vinci Code	Banned for religiously sensitive material to Christians.

== Tajikistan ==
Date	Title	Notes
2012	The Dictator	Banned because of subversiveness.

== Tanzania ==
Date	Title	Notes
2014	The Route	Banned because this documentary about human trafficking and sex slavery in Africa "showed too much sex and nudity" and thus was a "threat to Tanzanian culture."

== Taiwan ==
Date	Title	Notes
1982	Boat People	Banned due it being filmed on Hainan, an island in China.
2015	Love	Taiwan's Ministry of Culture refused to issue the Restricted rating in December 2015, citing article 9 of the 2015 regulations and article 235 of the Criminal Code. After the distributor cut 170 seconds of close-ups on physical intimacy, including sexual intercourse, fingering, ejaculation, fellatio, and similar, the film was released in April 2016.

== Thailand ==
Date	Title	Notes
1956	The King and I (1956)	Banned because could be construed as disrespectful towards the King of Thailand.
1999	Brokedown Palace	Banned because of its negative portrayal of Thailand with narcotics smuggling – especially with the views of the Thai judicial system despite parts of the film shot on location by the second unit (the majority of the film was filmed in the Philippines).
1999	Anna and the King	Banned because could be construed as disrespectful towards the King of Thailand.
2007	All the Boys Love Mandy Lane	Banned due to violence.
2007	Halloween (2007 remake)	Banned due to depictions of violence.
2008	Frontier(s)	Banned due to violence.
2008	Funny Games	Banned due to cruelty and violence.
2009	Zack and Miri Make a Porno	Banned by the Ministry of Culture due to sexual content (characters showing how to make their own pornographic video; teens may try to mimic).
2010	Saw VI	Banned due to pro-Thaksin protests and violence in Thailand.

== Tunisia ==
Date	Title	Notes
1959	Ben-Hur	Banned from all Arab League states because actress Haya Harareet was Israeli.
2006	Borat	Banned in every Arab League country except Lebanon.
2017	Wonder Woman	Banned because it features Israeli actress Gal Gadot.
2018	Call Me by Your Name	Banned for "attack on liberties" motivated by "the subject of the film".
2022	Death on the Nile	Banned because it features the Israeli actress Gal Gadot.

== Turkey ==
Date	Title	Notes
1969	Bir Çirkin Adam (An Ugly Man)	Banned for its revelations of the social conditions in the country.
1979	Yorgun Savaşçı (The Tired Warrior)	Banned because it was written by Kemal Tahir, who opposed the regime, and because the story casts doubt on the uniqueness of Kemal Atatürk's contribution to the struggle for the republic in the 1920s.
1987	Su da Yanar (Water Also Burns)	Banned because it dealt with the banned communist poet Nâzım Hikmet.
1988	The Last Temptation of Christ	Banned for blasphemic themes.
2014	Nymphomaniac	Banned due to sexual content.
2020	Cuties	Banned because of imagery displaying child sexualization and exploitation.
2022	Lightyear	Banned due to a brief lesbian kiss scene.
2024	Queer	Banned for its "provocative content".

== Uganda ==
Date	Title	Notes
1972–1979	All foreign films	President Idi Amin banned all foreign films in 1972 on the grounds that they contained "imperialist propaganda".
2014	The Wolf of Wall Street	Banned, like in most other African countries, due to its obscene content.

== Ukraine ==
Date	Title	Notes
2005	Hostel	Banned because it depicts Eastern Europe as a region where people are tortured for money. Owning and viewing the film in private is still legal.
2006	Land of the Dead	Banned due to high level violence and blood and gore. The film also depicts the suffering and the agony of people who were forced to eat human flesh in Kharkiv during the German attack there in 1943.
2007	Hostel: Part II	Banned for the same reason as Hostel. Owning and viewing the film in private is still legal.
2009	Brüno	Banned for its homosexual themes and other vulgarities.
2009	Saw VI	Banned because of scenes of brutal gory violence and torture. In the context of the Saw franchise, this is the only part that is banned. Thereby it is illegal to sell or distribute it, since visa is not given.
2010	My iz budushchego 2 (We Are from the Future 2)	This Russian film about four boys, two Russians and two Ukrainians, re-enacting the Lvov–Sandomierz offensive, ending in that timeline, was banned in Ukraine for being Anti-Ukrainian, as it depictied the Ukrainian boys as "radical nationalists fighting only for the German side", as well for its offensive depiction of the Ukrainian Insurgent Army.
2018	Hunter Killer	Banned because the Ukrainian Ministry of Culture states that the film demonstrates "the military power of Russia".
2020	8 First Dates	Banned by Ukraine's Cinema Agency because one of its actresses, Yekaterina Varnava, was blacklisted for five years for visiting Crimea during Russian occupation to attend a comedy show in 2016.
2023	Machete	Banned because one of its co-stars, Steven Seagal, visited Crimea during the Russian occupation without permission from the Ukrainian authorities, causing him to be blacklisted from the country.

== United Arab Emirates ==
Date	Title	Notes
1959	Ben-Hur	Banned from all Arab League states because actress Haya Harareet was Israeli.
2005	Brokeback Mountain	Banned because it depicts homosexual themes.
2010	Lamhaa	Banned because of its "objectionable content"; it did not receive a clearance certificate from the UAE Censors Board and was pulled from all UAE cinemas. This is the first Bollywood film to be banned in the UAE.
2014	Noah	Banned for depicting the prophets.
2015	Fifty Shades of Grey	Banned due to its sexual content.
2022	Lightyear	Banned due to a brief lesbian kiss scene.
2023	Demon Slayer: Kimetsu no Yaiba – To the Swordsmith Village	The first Japanese film to be banned due to a scene's explicit nature where Mitsuri Kanroji, Love Hashira, takes a shower in the hot spring. The ban was lifted when Ufotable allows to censor the mentioned scene.
2023	Spider-Man: Across the Spider-Verse	Banned due to it containing frames which feature a transgender flag on which the phrase "Protect Trans Kids" is displayed.

== United States ==
Generally speaking, the government itself cannot ban a film, since the United States Supreme Court ruled that films are protected by the First Amendment to the United States Constitution in a landmark 1950s decision. Instead of formal government censorship or bans, the film industry has, largely, policed itself through content-based ratings that are awarded to the vast majority of films that are to be publicly exhibited. Sometimes, a filmmaker may make edits to a film to avoid an 'R-rating' or an 'NC-17' rating, but a modern-day, government ban on a film would likely be struck down by the courts.

== Uruguay ==
Date	Title	Notes
1973	State of Siege	

== Venezuela ==
Date	Title	Notes
1972	Last Tango in Paris	Banned for its strong sexual content during the first presidency of Rafael Caldera.
1981	Ledezma, el caso Mamera	Banned for exposing state corruption, as well as accused of being an apology for crime, and the director imprisoned; courts overturned both decisions.
2016	El Inca	Pulled from cinemas and banned after a family injunction over the representation in the biopic; reportedly the first time a Venezuelan film has been banned in its country in 25 years. After being banned, the film was selected as Venezuela's representative as Best Foreign Language Film at the Academy Awards, a controversial choice.
2019	Infection	Not screened, reportedly for presenting Chavist ideology in a negative light. The production cooperated with the CNAC over 9 months to try and get it shown, but the film was still eventually banned; the CNAC's former chairman called the move censorship. The film's director, Flavio Pedota, lives in exile.
2019	Chavismo: The Plague of the 21st Century	Documentary; Banned from being shown in public and at universities for supposedly inciting hate; director Gustavo Tovar-Arroyo lives in exile from the country.

== Vietnam ==
Date	Title	Notes
1995	Xich lo (Cyclo)	Banned for being too "westernised" in its portrayal of urban poverty in the country.
2001	Green Dragon	Banned as of 2002.
2002	We Were Soldiers	Banned as of 2002.
2010	Sex and the City 2	Banned because of a conflict of "cultural values".
2012	The Hunger Games	Banned because of extreme violence and killing.
2012	The Girl With The Dragon Tattoo	Banned because its international distributor, Sony Pictures, did not accept the requirement by the Vietnamese National Film Board of cutting out some sensitive scenes.
2019	Abominable	Taken out of cinemas over a scene showing the nine-dash line that is used by the People's Republic of China to lay claim to parts of the South China Sea.
2021	Taste	Banned because of a conflict of "culture values".
2022	Uncharted	Banned because of a scene showing the nine-dash line that is used by the People's Republic of China to lay claim to parts of the South China Sea.
2022	The Roundup	Banned because of "violent scenes" and negative portrayal of Ho Chi Minh City.
2023	John Wick: Chapter 4	Unofficially banned because of the appearance of Donnie Yen, who supports the nine-dash line that is used by the People's Republic of China to lay claim to parts of the South China Sea.
2023	Barbie	Banned from cinemas because one of its scenes shows maps allegedly featuring the nine-dash line that is used by the People's Republic of China to lay claim to parts of the South China Sea; the Tien Phong newspaper reported that the map appears multiple times throughout the film. The claims were defended by Warner Bros., the film's distributor, who issued a statement saying that the map was a 'child-like crayon drawing' and that it was 'not intended to make any statement'.

== Yemen ==
Date	Title	Notes
1959	Ben-Hur	Banned from all Arab League states because actress Haya Harareet was Israeli.
2006	Borat	Banned in every Arab League country except Lebanon.

== Yugoslavia ==
Date	Title	Notes
1937	La Grande Illusion	Banned in 1937 for its anti-war message.
1952–1977	Ciguli Miguli	Banned under the government of Josip Broz Tito for its satire of socialist bureaucracy. Issued a license for public showing only in 1977.
1971–1987	W.R.: Mysteries of the Organism	Banned under the government of Josip Broz Tito and seven years after his death in 1980.

== Zimbabwe ==
Date	Title	Notes
1986	Jock of the Bushveld	Banned because of its South African origins. At the time Zimbabwe boycotted South African products because of its apartheid regime.
2010	Lobola	Concerned with the custom of lobola, the film was banned because it "doesn't really portray African custom when it comes to marriage, since one does not get married while drunk." Another objection is a scene where a young couple kisses in front of their parents, as well as the "abrupt ending".
2014	Kumasowe	Banned because it depicts violent clashes between members of an apostolic sect in the country and Zimbabwe Republic police officers.
2015	Fifty Shades of Grey	Banned because of the explicit erotic scenes. In some theaters an edited version was allowed.

== See also ==
- List of books banned by governments
- List of banned video games by country
- Streisand effect
- Television censorship
