= Polish Film Heritage List =

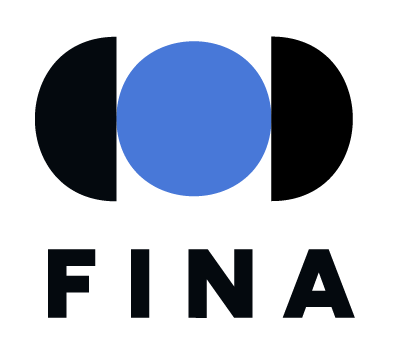
National Film Archive logo

The Polish Film Heritage List was established in 2025 by the National Film Archive – Audiovisual Institute. In November 2025, 70 items for the list were announced. Chronologically, the list starts with the oldest survived Polish film, Pruska kultura (Prussian Culture). Ten more items were added in March 2026.

Title	Director	Rel.	Add.	Ref.
Pruska kultura	Unknown	1908	2025	
Bestia	Aleksander Hertz	1917	2025	
Ludzie bez jutra	Aleksander Hertz	1919	2025	
Amateur film recorded with Kazimierz Prószyński's camera "Oko"	Unknown	1925	2025	
A Strong Man	Henryk Szaro	1929	2025	
Janko muzykant	Ryszard Ordyński	1930	2025	
Experimental films by Paweł Binn	Paweł Binn	1934-1961	2025	
Mistrz Chochelka w opałach	Jan Jarosz	1935	2025	
The Banner of Freedom	Ryszard Ordyński	1935	2025	
Droga młodych	Aleksander Ford	1936	2025	
Przygoda człowieka poczciwego	Franciszka, Stefan Themerson	1937	2025	
The Girls from Nowolipki	Józef Lejtes	1937	2025	
Neighbors	Leon Trystan	1937	2025	
Znachor	Michał Waszyński	1937	2026	
The Dybbuk	Michał Waszyński	1937	2025	
Film materials from the Warsaw Uprising	Multiple authors	1944	2026	
Polish Film Chronicle	–	1944-1994	2025	
Forbidden Songs	Leonard Buczkowski	1946	2025	
The Great Way	Michał Waszyński	1946	2025	
Gimnastyka dla wszystkich	Natalia Brzozowska, Konstanty Gordon	1946	2025	
The Last Stage	Wanda Jakubowska	1947	2025	
Pan Piórko śni	Zenon Wasilewski	1949	2025	
Przygoda na Mariensztacie	Leonard Buczkowski	1953	2025	
Kanał	Andrzej Wajda	1956	2026	
Ludzie z pustego obszaru	Władysław Ślesicki, Kazimierz Karabasz	1957	2025	
Był sobie raz...	Walerian Borowczyk	1957	2025	
Ewa chce spać	Tadeusz Chmielewski	1957	2025	
Eroica	Andrzej Munk	1957	2025	
Ashes and Diamonds	Andrzej Wajda	1958	2025	
The Last Day of Summer	Tadeusz Konwicki	1958	2025	
Two Men and a Wardrobe	Roman Polański	1958	2025	
Kabaret Starszych Panów	Jeremi Przybora, Jerzy Wasowski	1958-1966	2026	
Awantura o Basię	Maria Kaniewska	1959	2025	
Night Train	Jerzy Kawalerowicz	1959	2026	
Mother Joan of the Angels	Jerzy Kawalerowicz	1960	2025	
The Musicians	Kazimierz Karabasz	1960	2025	
Knights of the Teutonic Order	Aleksander Ford	1960	2025	
Czerwone i czarne	Witold Giersz	1963	2026	
The Saragossa Manuscript	Wojciech Has	1964	2025	
Identification Marks: None	Jerzy Skolimowski	1964	2025	
Archeology	Andrzej Brzozowski	1967	2025	
All Friends Here	Sylwester Chęciński	1967	2025	
The Stairs	Stefan Schabenbeck	1968	2025	
The Cruise	Marek Piwowski	1970	2025	
The Third Part of the Night	Andrzej Żuławski	1971	2025	
Pearl in the Crown	Kazimierz Kutz	1971	2025	
How Far Away, How Near	Tadeusz Konwicki	1971	2026	
Na wylot	Grzegorz Królikiewicz	1972	2025	
The Promised Land	Andrzej Wajda	1974	2026	
The Deluge	Jerzy Hoffman	1974	2025	
Sztuka konsumpcyjna	Natalia LL	1975	2025	
Nights and Days	Jerzy Antczak	1975	2026	
Man of Marble	Andrzej Wajda	1976	2025	
Elementarz	Wojciech Wiszniewski	1976	2025	
Camouflage	Krzysztof Zanussi	1976	2025	
Wielka podróż Bolka i Lolka	Stanisław Dülz, Władysław Nehrebecki	1977	2025	
Z mojego okna	Józef Robakowski	1978-1999	2025	
Ostry film zaangażowany	Julian Antonisz	1979	2025	
Camera Buff	Krzysztof Kieślowski	1979	2025	
Gadające głowy	Krzysztof Kieślowski	1980	2025	
Teddy Bear	Stanisław Bareja	1980	2025	
Tango	Zbigniew Rybczyński	1980	2025	
A Lonely Woman	Agnieszka Holland	1981	2025	
Vabank	Juliusz Machulski	1981	2025	
Krzyk	Barbara Sass	1982	2025	
Interrogation	Ryszard Bugajski	1982	2025	
Akademia pana Kleksa	Krzysztof Gradowski	1983	2025	
O-Bi, O-Ba: The End of Civilization	Piotr Szulkin	1984	2025	
Medium	Jacek Koprowicz	1985	2025	
Escape from the 'Liberty' Cinema	Wojciech Marczewski	1990	2025	
Pigs	Władysław Pasikowski	1992	2025	
Miejsce urodzenia	Paweł Łoziński	1992	2025	
Wszystko może się przytrafić	Marcel Łoziński	1995	2025	
Bara Bara	Maria Zmarz-Koczanowicz, Michał Arabudzki	1996	2026	
The Debt	Krzysztof Krauze	1999	2025	
Że życie ma sens	Grzegorz Lipiec	2000	2025	
The Cathedral	Tomasz Bagiński	2002	2025	
Day of the Wacko	Marek Koterski	2002	2025	
Concorde	Wilhelm Sasnal	2003	2025	
The Wedding	Wojciech Smarzowski	2004	2025	
