= Kazimierz Karabasz =

Kazimierz Karabasz (Polish pronunciation: [kaˈʑimjɛʑ kaˈrabaʂ]; May 6, 1930, in Bydgoszcz, Poland – August 11, 2018) was a Polish documentary filmmaker. A graduate of the Łódź Film School in 1956, he also taught the documentary programme there for many years.

== Career ==
Although his work is now rarely seen, his most famous film, a ten-minute documentary short entitled Muzykanci / The Musicians, is an extra on the Criterion Collection edition of Krzysztof Kieślowski's film The Double Life of Véronique. Kieślowski, whom Karabasz mentored, chose this as one of his personal all-time top ten films in a 1992 poll conducted by the film magazine Sight & Sound.

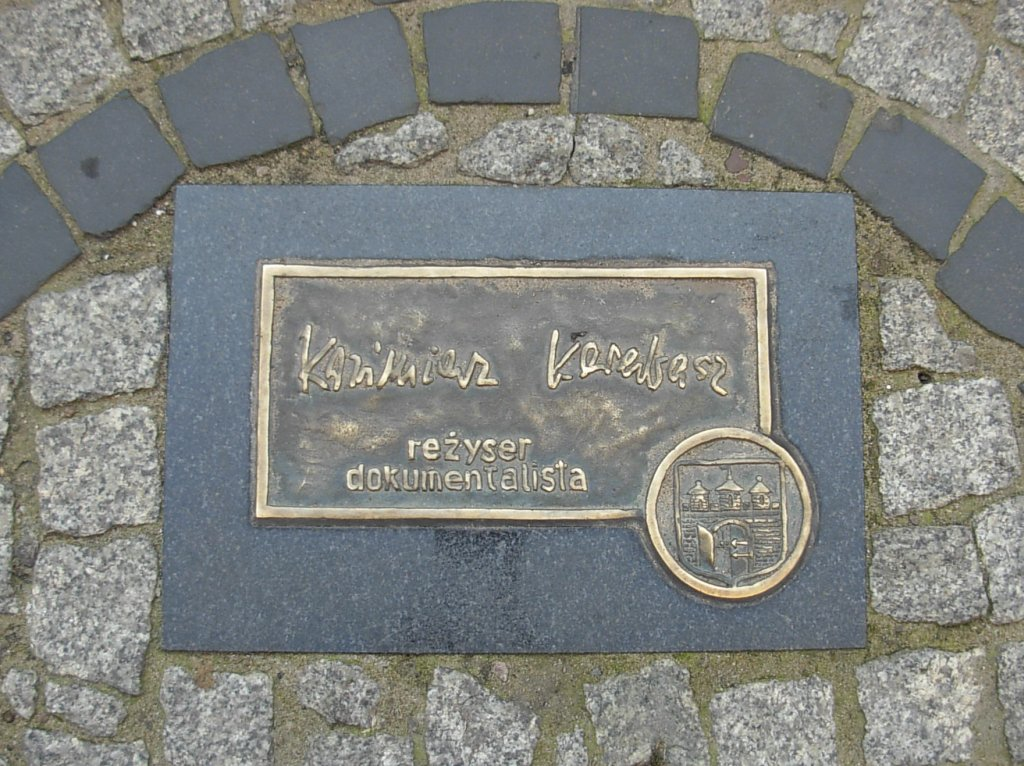

Karabasz is known in Poland for influencing generations of documentary filmmakers to come with his approach to filmmaking called "school of Karabasz" (Polish: szkoła Karabasza). The style focuses of regular people's lives and requires a perspective of an observer with zero impact on the observed object. Muzykanci is considered a textbook example of "Karabasz school". The method was especially popular in the sixties and associated with the œuvre of Władysław Ślesicki, Andrzej Trzos-Rastawiecki, Krystyna Gryczełowska and Danuta Halladin among others.

== Filmography ==
- Jak co dzień / As Every Day (1955)
- Gdzie diabeł mówi dobranoc / Where the Devil Says Goodnight (1957)
- Ludzie z pustego obszaru / People From an Empty Zone (1957)
- Z Powiśla / From Powiśle (1958)
- Dzień bez słonca / A Day Without the Sun (1959)
- Trochę inny świat / A Slightly Different World (1959)
- Ludzie w drodze / On the Road (1960)
- Muzykanci / The Musicians (1960; included in the Polish Film Heritage List)
- Węzeł / The Junction (1961)
- Pierwszy krok / The First Step (1962)
- Tu gdzie żyjemy / Here, Where We Live (1962)
- Jubileusz / The Anniversary (1962)
- Ptaki / Birds (1963)
- W klubie / In the Club (1963)
- Urodzeni w roku 1944 / Born in 1944 (1964)
- Na progu / At the threshold (1965)
- Rok Franka W. / The Year of Frank W (1967)
- Sobota / Saturday (1969)
- Przypis / Footnote (1970)
- Zgodnie z rozkazem / Following Orders (1970)
- Sierpień – zapis kronikalny / August – A Chronicle (1971)
- Przed... / Before... (1972)
- Krystyna M. (1973)
- Punkt widzenia / Point of View (1974)
- Pryzmat / Prism (1976)
- Lato w Żabnie / Summer in Żabno (1977)
- We Dwoje / The Two of Us (1977)
- Przenikanie / Assimilating (1978)
- Dialog / Dialogue (1979)
- Wędrujący cień / A Wandering Shadow (1979)
- Próba materii / Material Test (1981)
- Cień juz niedaleko / A Looming Shadow (1985)
- Pamięć / Memory (1985)
- Widok z huty / A View From the Steelworks (1990)
- Na przykład / ulica Grzybowska 9 – 9 Grzybowska Street, for example (1991)
- Okruchy / Crumbs (1994)
- Portret w kropli / A Portrait in a Drop (1997)
- O świcie i przed zmierzchem / At Sunrise and Before Dusk (1999)
- W pierwszej fazie lotu / In the First Phase of Flight (2001)
- Czas podwójny / Double Time (2001)
- Spotkania / Meetings (2004)
- Co w bagażu? / What's in Storage (2008)
