= Mordka Towbin =

Jewish film producer and businessman (1872–c. 1920)

Mordechaj (Mordka) Abramowicz Towbin (1872 – c. 1920) was a businessman and among the first film producers in Poland.

== Biography ==
In 1872, Mordechaj Abramowicz Towbin was born to a merchant family in the Volhynian town of Zaslav, then part of the Russian Empire. He arrived in Warsaw at some time before the beginning of 1907. He lived with his family at an apartment in the central district of the city, outside of the Yiddish-speaking northern neighborhoods. In January 1907, he helped found Iluzjon, one of the first cinemas in Warsaw; he soon became the co-owner of the establishment, and was its sole owner by 1910. In 1909–1910, he also ran the "Society of the United Cinematographic Factories The Luxgraph", a company which screened films at open-air events and the National Philharmonic Hall. He established the city's first film rental and distribution office in 1910.

Towbin's Pruska kultura (1908)

In early 1908, Towbin commissioned and produced a film later entitled Pruska kultura, 'Prussian Culture', detailing conflict between the Poles of Poznań and the ruling German authorities. The film was inspired by political conflicts over the previous years against Germanisation policies, including the 1901 Września children strike and the protests of Michał Drzymała. Local Russian authorities in Warsaw prevented Towbin from producing the film domestically, leading him to commission a French firm; this may have been the production studio Pathé Frères, which had business ties to Warsaw. In May 1908, the film was screened in Moscow and Italy, although censorship likely prevented it from being shown in Poland until 1914.

At some point in the late 1900s, Towbin founded a production studio named Kantor Zjednoczonych Kinematografów Siła. Later in 1908, he collaborated with stage performer Antoni Fertner to produce a short comedy titled Antoś pierwszy raz w Warszawie ('Antoś in Warsaw for the first time'). Fertner commissioned the film and played its protagonist, a rural man befuddled by city life. Premiering at Fertner's cinema, Oaza, in October 1908, it was generally considered the first Polish film by later film historians before the rediscovery of Pruska kultura in 2000.

After he hired a camera operator (Stanisław Sebel) and director (Mark Arnshteyn) for his studio, Towbin produced a series of adaptations of Yiddish plays and dramas. Many of these were collaborations with the Literarishe Trupe, a theater company ran by the Kaminsky family. The first of these, Der vilder foter ('The Cruel Father', 1911) was simply a filmed performance of a play by the Literarishe Trupe. Towbin produced a total of nine features over his career. Branching out from Yiddish cinema, he attempted to reach a broader Polish audience in 1912 with Wojewoda, but was commercially unsuccessful. Siła folded later that year, but was quickly succeeded by Kosmofilm, a production studio founded by one of his former associates. Towbin retired from production, but continued operating his cinema and film distribution businesses.

Towbin left Warsaw, either following the outbreak of the First World War in 1914 or (more likely) the German occupation of Warsaw the following year. He died around 1920.

== Filmography ==
- Pruska kultura (1907)
- Antoś pierwszy raz w Warszawie (1908)
- Der vilder foter (or Okrutny ojciec, 1911)
- Hasa die yesome (or Chasydka i odstępca, 1911)
- Zabójca z nędzy (or Idiota, 1911)
- Di fershtoysene (or Wydziedziczeni, 1912)
- Got, mensch un tayvl (or Bóg, człowiek i szatan, 1912)
- Mirele Efros (1912)
- Wojewoda (or Voivode, 1912)
