= Września children's strike =

1901–1904 Polish civil rights protests

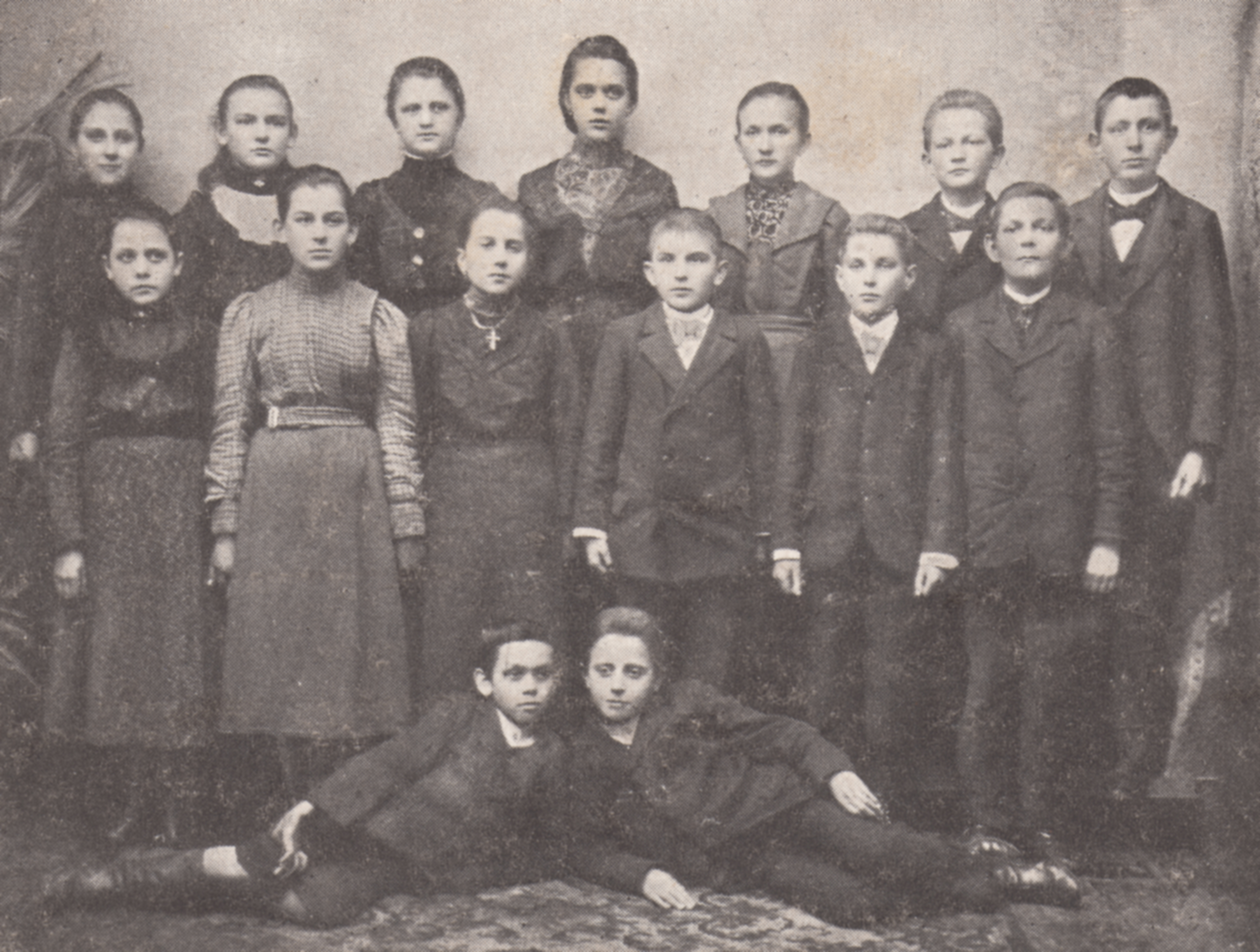
A group portriat of some of the children who participated in the strike

The Września children's strike, or Września school strike, refers to the 1901–1904 protests of Polish children and their parents in Września against the Germanisation of schools.

== Background ==
After having been annexed by the Kingdom of Prussia during the late-18th-century partitions of Poland, German became the language of instruction in all schools across the German territories of Greater Poland from 1873, except in the two subjects of religion and music.

In March 1901, the German administration ordered religious classes to switch to German, resulting in outrage from Polish communities.

== Strike ==
In April 1901, a number of students (one source gives the number at 118) in the People's Catholic School in Września (Katolicka Szkoła Ludowa we Wrześni), attended by about 650 pupils, refused to accept new German textbooks and to participate in the class activities. The teachers responded with detention and corporal punishment. Over the coming weeks, the students' parents became increasingly vocal in protesting the punishment of their children. On 20 May 1901, a group of 100 to 200 people were protesting in front of the school until they were dispersed by police, who were called for by the school. The German administration threatened that the students would not be allowed to finish school. Adults involved in the protests were put on trial for public disturbance, preventing the officials from carrying out their duties, trespassing, and similar crimes, with 26 people officially charged. On 19 November 1901, 20 individuals were sentenced to imprisonment from several weeks to over two years.

Polish activists formed two committees to support families whose members were imprisoned. The German administration soon disbanded the committees and, in turn, charged the activists.

Despite the trials, the protests continued. Some parents moved their children to other schools, and the school officials constructed barracks, where the protesting children were isolated. Use of the Polish language was banned on the school grounds, and police were in charge of enforcing student attendance.

After an amnesty for children was declared in 1903, the number of children still refusing to take the German religion lessons diminished. The last striking children had given up by the summer of 1904.

== Recognition and impact ==
The strike gained international attention. In late 1901, Polish composer Ignacy Jan Paderewski declared that the proceeds from his concert in Germany would be donated to Września activists, and was, in turn, booed and boycotted by German audiences. As a result, he refused to perform in Germany. The cause was taken up by other Polish cultural figures, such as the writer Henryk Sienkiewicz.

After learning about the strikes, Maria Konopnicka began organising an international movement of women, specifically mothers, to send directly to the then Queen of Prussia, Augusta Victoria of Schleswig-Holstein, signed protest letters that oppose the treatment of striking Polish children. A statue of Maria Konopnicka was erected in Września in recognition of her active defense of the movement.

The Września strike inspired another large strike of Polish students in 1907.

The strike was documented, in what has been described as the oldest Polish film, Pruska kultura, made in 1908 by Mordechaj Towbin. Another movie about the events, Wizja lokalna 1901, was made in 1981 by Filip Bajon.

== Sources ==
- John J. Kulczycki (1981). School Strikes in Prussian Poland, 1901-1907: The Struggle Over Bilingual Education. Boulder [Colo.] : East European Monographs; New York. ISBN 978-0-914710-76-9.
- Stanisław A. Blejwas, American Polonia and the School Strike in Września,
- (in Polish) L. Kostrzewski, "Przebieg strajku szkolnego we Wrześni w 1901 roku", w: Strajk szkolny we Wrześni w 1901 r., Września 2001
- (in Polish) Monika Warneńska, Ulica dzieci wrzesińskich. Krajowa Agencja Wydawnicza, 1983.
- (in Polish) Strajk dzieci wrzesińskich z perspektywy wieku, opracowanie zbiorowe pod redakcją Stanisława Sierpowskiego. Bogucki Wydawnictwo Naukowe, Poznań, Września 2001.
