= Pearl in the Crown =

1972 Polish film

- Directed by: Kazimierz Kutz
- Written by: Kazimierz Kutz
- Screenplay by: Bolesław Kamykowski
- Produced by: Zespół Filmowy Wektor
- Starring: Łucja Kowolik; Marian Opania; Olgierd Łukaszewicz; Jan Englert; Franciszek Pieczka
- Cinematography: Stanisław Loth
- Edited by: Irena Chorynska
- Music by: Wojciech Kilar
- Release date: 27 January 1972
- Running time: 111 minutes
- Country: Poland
- Language: Polish

Pearl in the Crown (Polish: Perła w koronie) is a 1972 Polish drama film directed by Kazimierz Kutz. It was entered into the 1972 Cannes Film Festival. The film was also selected as the Polish entry for the Best Foreign Language Film at the 45th Academy Awards, but was not accepted as a nominee.

In 2025, the film was included on the Polish Film Heritage List established that year.

== Plot ==
The film takes place in August 1934 in the Polish part of Upper Silesia. The film tells the story of a strike in the fictional mine "Zygmunt". Jaś, a young miner who works in the mine, has a wife and two young sons. Jaś comes home from his shift. The next day he learns that the unprofitable mine is to be closed by flooding with water. A strike breaks out. Families help the strikers, despite the fact that the mine is surrounded by a police cordon. Petitions to the Government go unanswered, the management persists, so the miners announce a hunger strike. The police retaliate by violently breaking up the demonstration. The determined miners decide to continue the strike underground despite the imminent threat of the mine being flooded. Finally though, the management signs a settlement, and the miners come to the surface and go back to their families.

== Cast ==
- Łucja Kowolik as Wikta
- Olgierd Łukaszewicz as Jas
- Jan Englert as Erwin Maliniok
- Franciszek Pieczka as Hubert Siersza
- Jerzy Cnota as August Mol
- Bernard Krawczyk as Franciszek Bula
- Tadeusz Madeja as Ochman
- Henryk Maruszczyk as Alojz Grudniok
- Marian Opania as Albert
- Jerzy Siwy as Milenda

== See also ==
- List of submissions to the 45th Academy Awards for Best Foreign Language Film
- List of Polish submissions for the Academy Award for Best Foreign Language Film
