= Pruska kultura =

1908 Polish silent film

- Produced by: Mordka Towbin
- Release date: 1908
- Running time: 8:20
- Country: Poland
- Languages: (Silent) Polish, French, subtitles

Pruska kultura, also known as Les Martyrs de la Pologne, or Prussian Culture, is a 1908 Polish silent film about the 1901 Września student revolt and Michał Drzymała's protest ("Drzymała's wagon"). Thought to be a lost film until 2000, it was discovered in Archives françaises du film, Bois-d'Arcy, Yvelines, France by film historians Małgorzata Hendrykowska and Marek Hendrykowski. At that time it was the oldest preserved Polish fiction film. In 1908 it was described as "scenes from the lives of Poznań Poles in the fight against Germans". The film opens the Polish Film Heritage List as the oldest survived Polish film.

The film was premiered within the Russian Empire in 1908, but was quickly censored by the Tsarist authorities after its showing. However, the film continued to be shown in Italy and France with French subtitles.

The film consists of seven parts:

1. Szkoła ludowa we Wrześni
2. Professor Kulturtreger
3. Katusze dzieci
4. Wywłaszczenie
5. Pruskie żołdactwo
6. Wóz Drzymały
7. Apoteoza Polski (Jutrzenka)
