= Statue of Maria Konopnicka (Września) =

Statue in Września, Poland

Maria Konopnicka Monument in Września
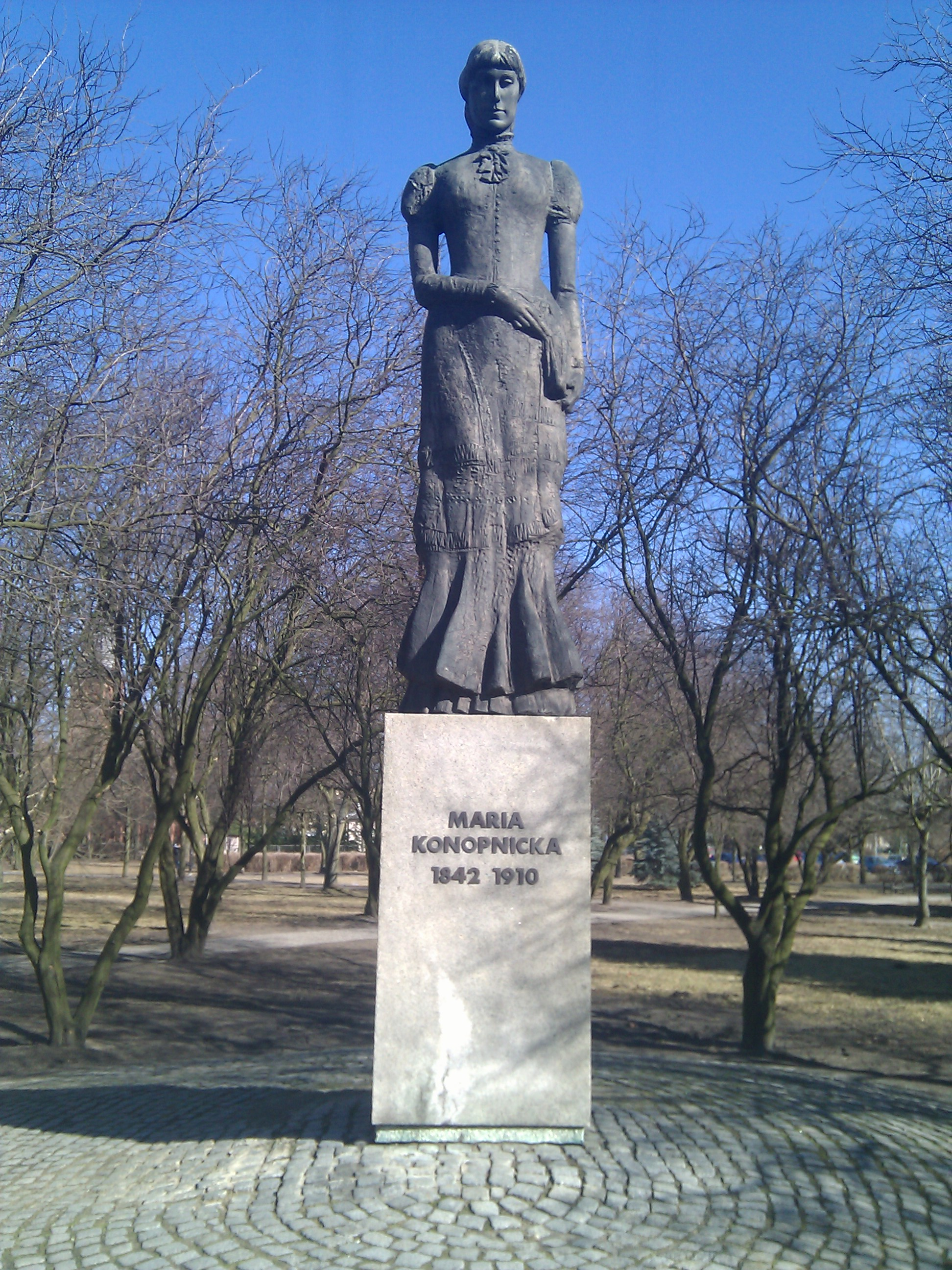
- View of the Maria Konopnicka Monument in Września, 2012
- Interactive map of Maria Konopnicka Monument in Września
- Location: Września, Poland
- Coordinates: 52°19′17″N 17°34′09″E
- Designer: Mieczysław Welter
- Material: bronze
- Height: 3.65 m (12.0 ft)
- Opening date: 1979
- Dedicated to: Maria Konopnicka

The Maria Konopnicka Monument in Września (Polish: Pomnik Marii Konopnickiej we Wrześni) is a bronze statue located in the town of Września, Greater Poland Region, and dedicated to Maria Konopnicka (1842–1910), a Polish poet, novelist, children's writer and activist for women's rights and for Polish independence.

== History ==
The monument was designed by sculptor Mieczysław Welter and officially unveiled in 1979. The bronze cast of the statute was made in the Pomet Metallurgy Works in Poznań (Zakłady Metalurgiczne "Pomet" w Poznaniu). The location of the monument was chosen to pay tribute to the poet for her support and defence of the schoolchildren participating in the Września School Strike against the policy of Germanization in the years 1901–1904. The monument was erected on the initiative of and funded by the inhabitants of Września. It is currently situated in the Children of Września Park. Near the monument, eight bronze sculptures of books designed by Poznań-born sculptor and medallist Józef Stasiński, have been located.

== Gallery ==
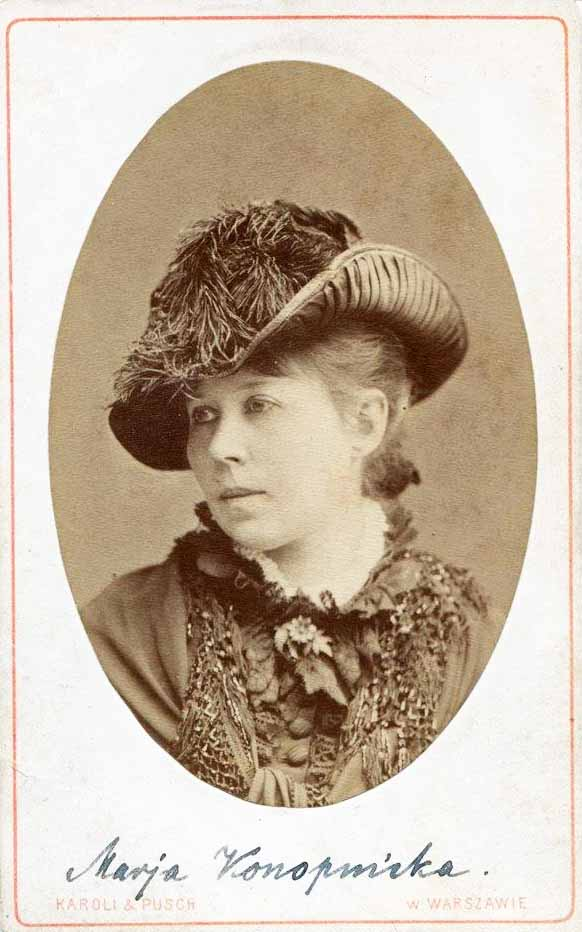
Maria Konopnicka

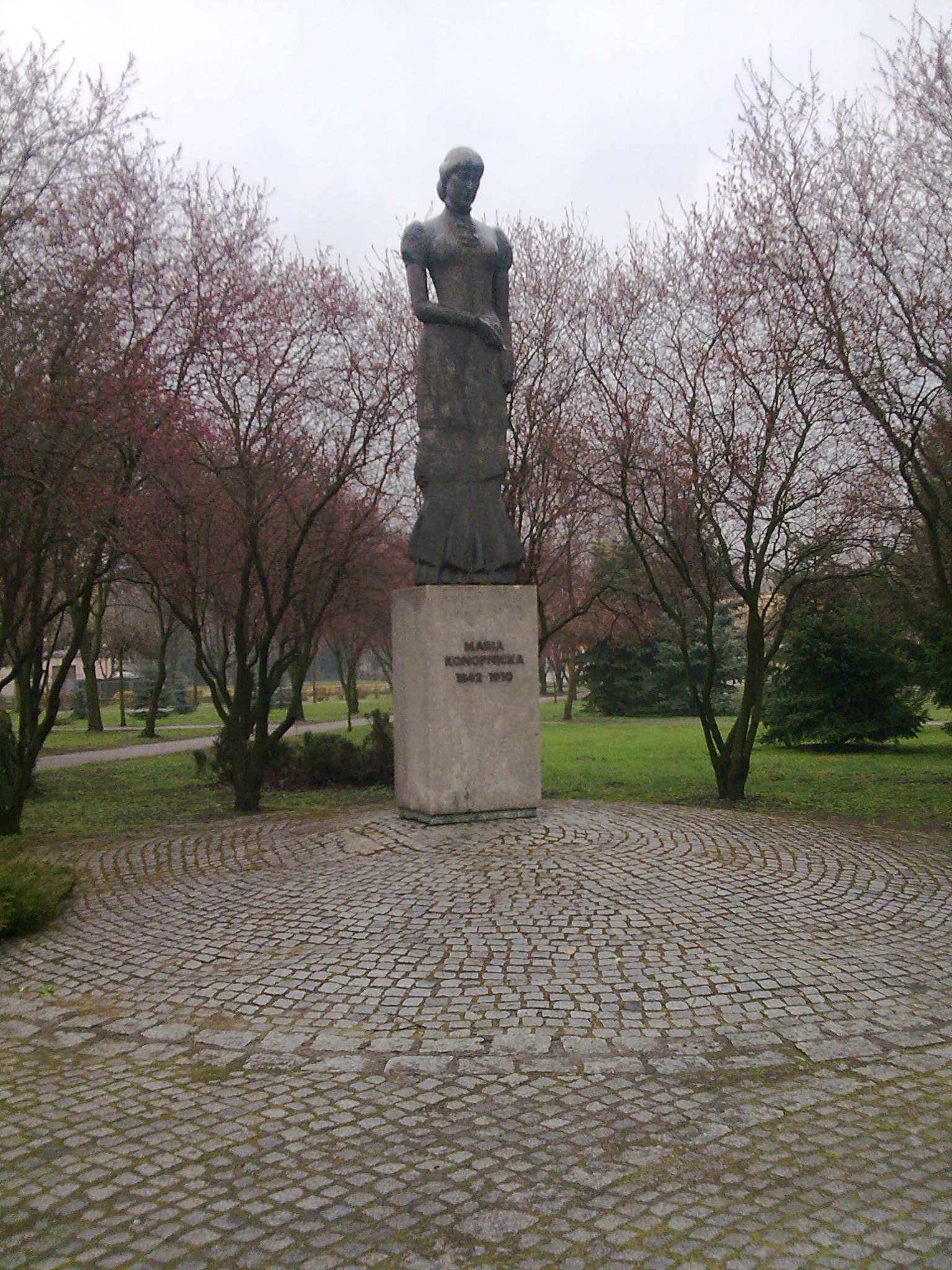
The monument

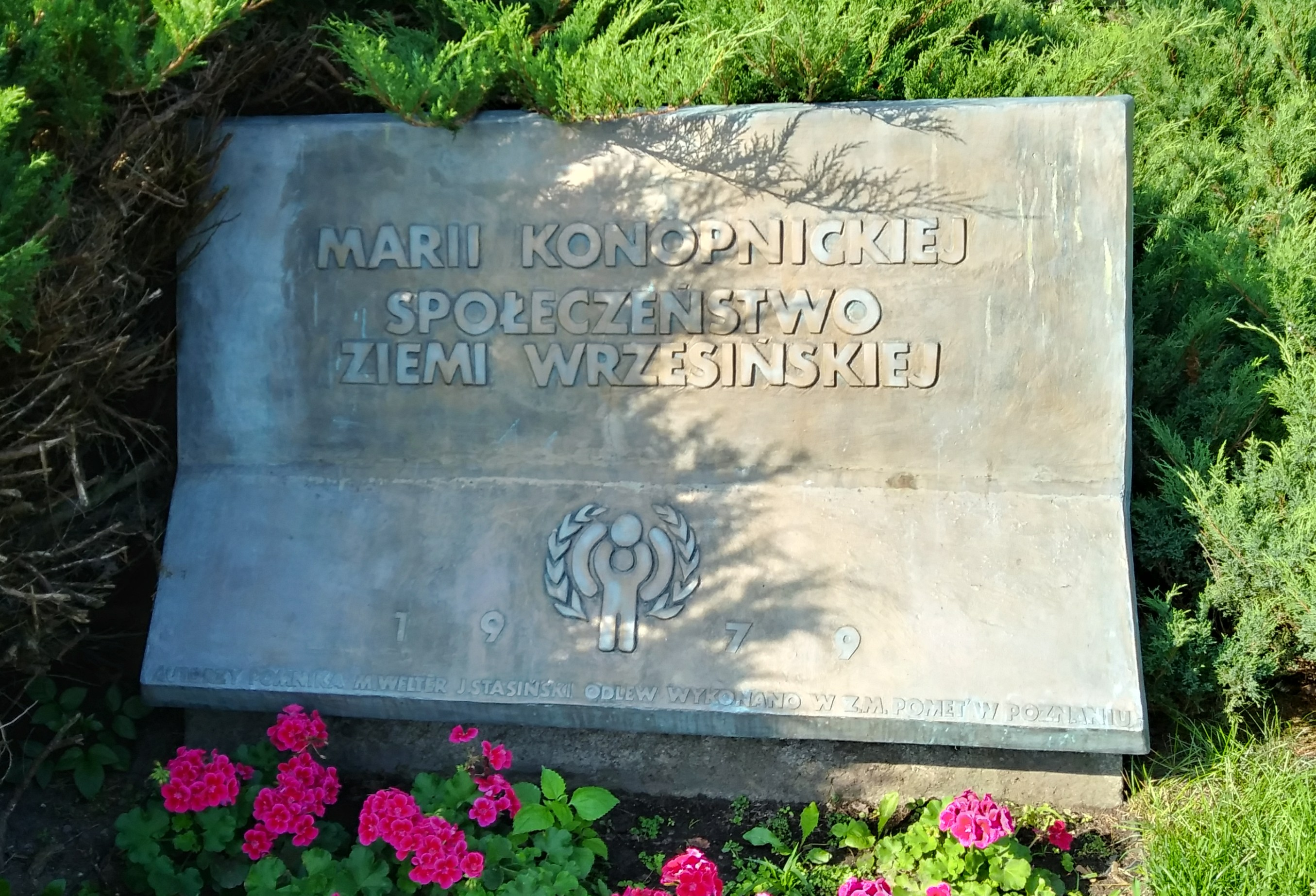
One of commemorative plaques dedicated to Maria Konopnicka

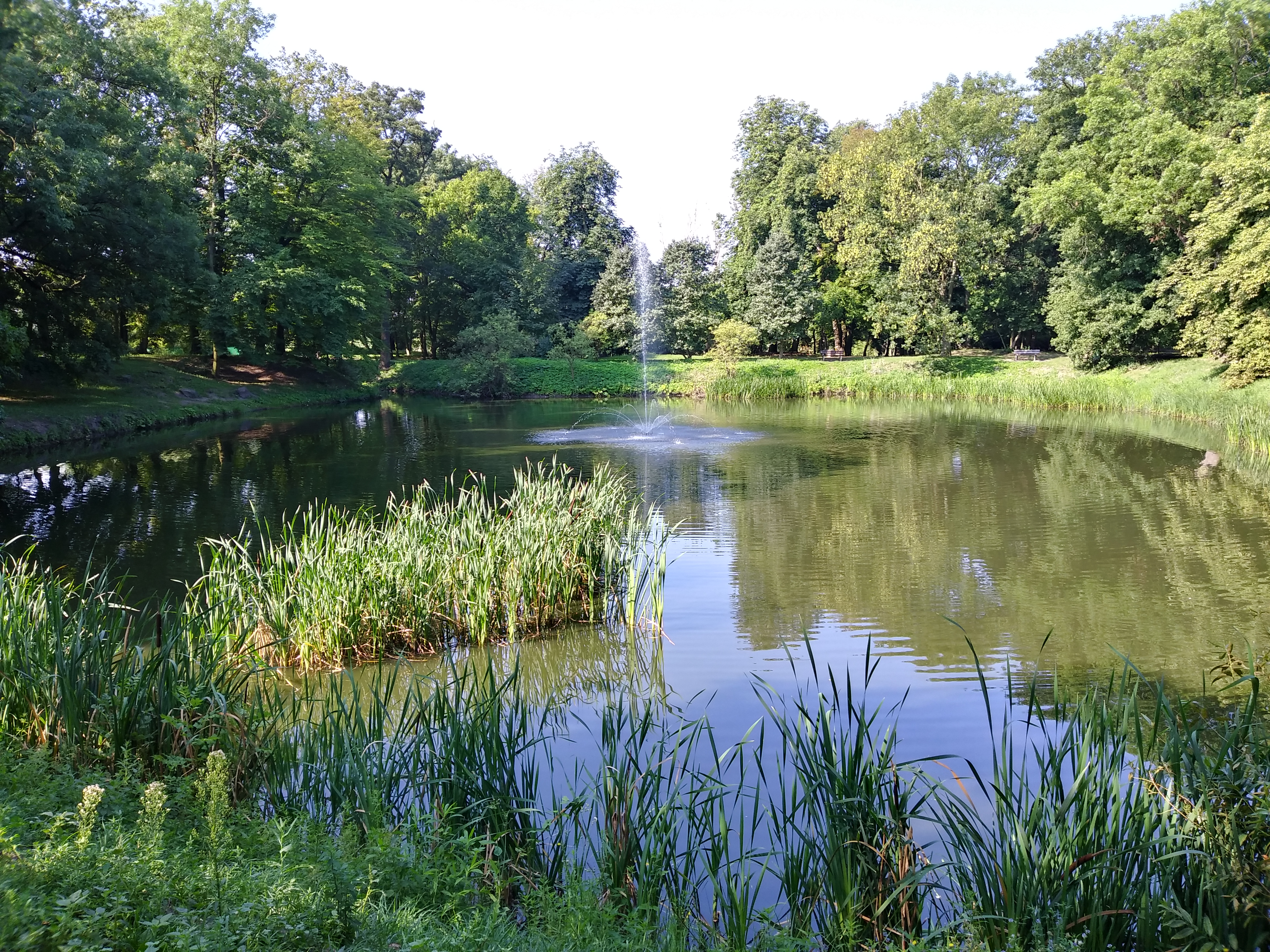
Children of Września Park where the monument is located

== See also ==
- History of Poland (1795–1918)
