= Wizja lokalna 1901 =

1981 Polish film

Wizja lokalna 1901 is a Polish historical film released in 1981. It was screened in the Directors' Fortnight at the 1981 Cannes Film Festival.

The film reconstructs the events in Września known as "Września school strike": when Polish language lessons were cancelled for the two highest grades, the students refused to respond and pray in German.
