= Wasp (2015 film) =

- Directed by: Philippe Audi-Dor
- Written by: Philippe Audi-Dor
- Starring: Hugo Bolton; Elly Condron; Simon Haycock
- Release date: 31 May 2015
- Running time: 1h 36min
- Country: United Kingdom
- Language: English

Wasp is a 2015 British/French romantic drama film directed by Philippe Audi-Dor and starring Hugo Bolton, Elly Condron, and Simon Haycock.

== Plot ==
Olivier and James, two men in a same-sex relationship, take a romantic break in Provence in the South of France. Their vacation is interrupted by the sudden arrival of Caroline, a friend of James, who recently broke up with her boyfriend. Caroline's presence causes a strain in the gay men's relationship, as a heterosexual attraction develops between Olivier and Caroline. The desire that is building between Olivier and Caroline threatens to undermine both Olivier's relationship with James and Caroline's friendship with James. Caroline wants to seduce Olivier, but he resists Caroline's advances. Olivier came out as gay later in life than James, so Olivier has sexual experience with women that James doesn't have. Caroline began her attempt at seducing Olivier when she learned that he had slept with women in the past before he came out of the closet, hoping she could convince Olivier to sleep with women again. James is unaware his friend is attempting to seduce his boyfriend. Olivier begins to question whether he is really gay or if he is bisexual. Although Olivier has developed a growing temptation to sleep with Caroline, his resistance results in Caroline leaving the couple's summer house. James begins to feel suspicious that his boyfriend is cheating on him, leading him to confront Olivier and Caroline. Caroline admits that she tried to seduce Olivier, but Olivier denied any desire to sleep with Caroline. The ending of the film is open-ended, the three of them leaving the house without saying a word.

== Background ==
Philippe Audi-Dor has stated that the film was inspired by his own struggles with his sexuality during his early 20s. Audi-Dor knew he wasn't straight because he has had sexual experiences with men, but didn't feel comfortable identifying as gay because he has had sexual experiences with women as well. The director also stated that writing the character of Olivier was the easiest character to write, since he identified with Olivier's struggle with his sexuality.

== Reception ==
Frank J. Avella, writing for Edge Media Network, wrote that 'Wasp' was a film that had the "audacity to invert the coming out story" and the "audacity to explore the fluidity and complexity of sexuality in a (politically incorrect) manner" by featuring the "ostensibly happy gay couple" have their relationship challenged by Olivier's burgeoning desire for Caroline.

=== Controversy ===
Due to the film's depiction of a gay male relationship, Wasp was banned by the Lebanese Censorship Bureau from being screened at the Beirut International Film Festival.

== Cast ==
- Hugo Bolton – James
- Elly Condron – Caroline
- Simon Haycock – Olivier
