= Australia Marches with Britain =

- Directed by: Ken G. Hall
- Produced by: Ken G. Hall
- Narrated by: Peter Bathurst
- Edited by: William Shepherd
- Production companies: Cinesound Productions; Department of Information
- Distributed by: National Films Council
- Release date: 30 May 1941
- Running time: 16 minutes
- Country: Australia
- Language: English

Australia Marches with Britain is a 1941 Australian documentary made for wartime propaganda.

== Synopsis ==
The documentary examines Australia's contribution to the war effort, including production of food, munitions and equipment. Then Minister of Information H.S. Foll introduces the film.

== Production ==
Produced and directed by Ken G. Hall, the film was originally made for export to England, to be used there by the British Ministry of Information as part of an intensive long term Empire publicity campaign. However, it was then decided to release the film in Australia as well. It was first released in cinemas across Australia on 30 May 1941.

The film ended up being widely screened throughout Allied countries, including the UK and US. In Britain alone, the film was screened in 4,500 cinemas.

== Reception ==
It was critically praised, The Sydney Morning Herald writing that "there is inspiration as well as imagination and drama in this film."

The Mount Magnet Leader and Youanmi Miner called the rural scenes "magnificent" hailed it as a film which "should hearten the people of Britain and make Australian's proud".

The Age described it as "the most inspiring war short yet produced in Australia".
