= Blue Heart =

Blue Heart may refer to:

- Blue Heart (album), an album by Stella Parton
- Blue Heart (play), a play by Caryl Churchill
- Blue Heart (film), a 2021 film by Miguel Coyula
- Uranothauma antinorii, an African butterfly
- Military
  - Operation Bluehearts, military operation during Korean War
- Plant
  - Buchnera americana, a member of the Broomrape family (Orobanchaceae)
- Fungus
  - Normandina pulchella, a lichen in the family Verrucariaceae
