= Wojciech Wiszniewski =

Polish filmmaker

Wojciech Wiszniewski (22 February 1946 in Łódź - 21 February 1981 in Warsaw) was a Polish filmmaker who mainly directed faux documentaries. Most of his films were censored by the communist authorities due to its pessimistic look at 1970s Poland. Only after his death were they released. His complete works have been released on DVD by Narodowy Instytut Audiowizualny.

== Filmography ==
- Zawał serca (Heart Attack, 1967, 7')
- Ślad (Trace, 1969, 6')
- Jutro. 31 kwietnia- 1 maja 1970 (Tomorrow. April 31 - May 1, 1970, 1970, 9')
- Wilkasy 70 (1971, 6')
- Opowieść o człowieku, który wykonał 552% normy (A Story of a Man Who Filled 552% Of The Quota, 1973, 25')
- Historia pewnej miłości (Random Love Story, 1974, 52')
- Wanda Gościmińska. Włókniarka (Wanda Gościmińska. A Weaver, 1975, 21') (cinematography by Zbigniew Rybczyński)
- Elementarz (The Primer, 1976, 9')
- Stolarz (The Carpenter, 1976, 13')
- ...Sztygar na zagrodzie... (Foreman On A Farm, 1978, 14')
