= Germanisation of the Province of Posen =

Percentage of Polish and German native speakers in the Province of Posen based on falsified 1910 Prussian census which included stationed German military as local German population. Other measures included removal of Poles speaking German language from Polish ethnic group in the census.

The Germanisation of the Province of Posen was a policy of the Kulturkampf measures enacted by German Chancellor Otto von Bismarck, whose goal was to Germanize Polish-speaking areas in the Prussian Province of Posen by eradicating and discrimination of Polish language and culture, as well as to reduce the influence of the "ultramontanist" Roman Catholic clergy in those regions.

== Background ==
Since the Third Partition of Poland in 1795 the former Polish–Lithuanian Commonwealth had ceased to exist as a state with its territory annexed by the surrounding great powers Austria, Prussia (which in turn became part of the German Empire in 1871) and Russia. Within the Prussian share were large parts of the historic Greater Poland region around Poznań (Posen), cradle of the first Polish state, which since 1848 were incorporated into the province of Posen.

=== Colonization and discrimination in Polish territories by Prussia until 1806 ===
In the course of the Ostsiedlung in the medieval period, Germans had settled in the region, especially in the western parts. Beginning in the 18th century there were several attempts at German colonisation, the first by the Prussian ruler Frederick the Great, who settled around 300,000 colonists in the Eastern provinces of Prussia, and simultaneously aimed to reduce Polish ownership of land. Poles were portrayed as 'backward Slavs' by Prussian officials who wanted to spread German language and culture. The land of Polish nobility was confiscated and given to German nobles.

In 1806, during the Napoleonic Wars, Polish leaders, with Napoleon's encouragement, successfully started an uprising against Prussian rule, contributing to the French victory over Prussia; in the 1807 Treaty of Tilsit, the Posen region was part of the territory ceded by Prussia and incorporated into the Duchy of Warsaw, a Polish state established by Napoleon and ruled by his ally Frederick August I of Saxony in a personal union.

=== Colonization and discrimination by Prussia until 1848 ===
By 1815 Germans made up a predominantly Protestant minority of about one third of the total population of the Posen region, while the majority of the inhabitants identified as Catholic ethnic Poles. In 1815, under agreements reached at the Congress of Vienna, following the defeat of Napoleon, the region returned to Prussian control as the Grand Duchy of Posen. Under the agreements, the Polish-speaking population was supposed to enjoy a certain amount of autonomy; the grand duchy was put under the administration of stadtholder Antoni Radziwiłł, who sought to act as a mediator between the central Prussian government and the Polish gentry. However, the international obligations undertaken by Prussia at the Congress were immediately violated. Intensive Germanization and restriction of rights of Polish population was implemented by Prussian officials who rejected any notions of autonomy. In 1819 the gradual elimination of Polish language in schools began, with German being introduced in its place. In 1825 August Jacob, a politician hostile to Poles, gained power over newly created Provincial Educational Collegium in Poznan.

Across the Polish territories Polish teachers were being removed from work, German educational programs were being introduced, and primary schooling was being replaced by German one that aimed at creation of loyal Prussian citizens. Already in 1816 the Polish gymnasium in Bydgoszcz was turned into a German school and Polish language removed from classes. In 1825 the Teacher's Seminary in Bydgoszcz was Germanized as well.

While in 1824 a Provincial Parliament was invoked in Greater Poland, the representation was based on wealth census, meaning that the end result gave most of the power to German minority in the area. Even when Poles managed to issue calls asking for enforcing of the guarantees formulated in treaties of Congress of Vienna and proclamations of Prussian King in 1815 they were rejected by Prussia. Thus neither the attempt to create Polish University in Poznań or Polish Society of Friends of Agriculture, Industry and Education were accepted by authorities. Nevertheless, Poles continued to ask for Polish representation in administration of the area, representing the separate character of the Duchy, keeping the Polish character of schools. From 1825 the increase of anti-Polish policies became more visible and intense. Prussian political circles demanded end to tolerance of Polishness. Among the Poles two groups emerged, one still hoping for respect of separate status of the Duchy and insisting on working with Prussian authorities hoping that in time they would grant some freedoms. The other faction still hoped for independence of Poland. As consequence many Polish activists were imprisoned. By 1830 November Uprising in neighboring Russian Congress Poland. Radziwiłł, whose brother Michał Gedeon had taken a leading part in the revolt, was dismissed by King Frederick William III and the actual power passed to Oberpräsident Eduard Heinrich von Flottwell, who enacted the first measures enforcing the use of the German language in schools and government agencies to limit the influence of the Polish clergy and nobility (szlachta).

Flotwell, a self-declared enemy of Poles openly called for Germanization and superiority of German culture over Polish people. Supported by Karl Grolman, a Prussian general, a program was presented that envisioned removing Poles from all offices, courts, judiciary system, and local administration, controlling the clergy, and making peasants loyal through enforced military service. Schools were to be Germanized as well. Those plans were supported by such prominent public figures such as Clauswitz, Gneisenau, Theodor von Schon, and Wilhelm von Humbold. By 1830 the right to use Polish in courts and institutions was no longer respected.

Another colonization attempt aiming at Germanization was pursued by Prussia after 1832. While Poles constituted 73% of population in 1815, they were reduced to 60% by 1848; at the same time the German presence grew from 25% to 30%.

=== Suppression of Polish attempts of independence by Prussia after 1848 ===
On the eve of the 1848 revolutions, the Polish struggles for autonomy were used by some support German liberals to counter possible intervention of Russia in German affairs; their target became the insurgents of the failed Greater Poland Uprising of 1846, above all Karol Libelt and Ludwik Mierosławski who had to face a public trial at the Kammergericht, who were praised and treated with gestures of sympathy including by King Frederick William IV. However, as soon as Poles in territories ruled by Prussia tried to regain autonomy and independence in the second Greater Poland Uprising of 1848: against Polish objections, German deputies from Posen attended the meetings of the Frankfurt Parliament and voted for the affiliation of the territory with the German Confederation. The Polish attempt to regain freedom was brutally crushed by Prussian army and in aftermath those taking part were imprisoned or even tortured. The Poles in Posen saw themselves finally incorporated into Germany with the formation of the North German Confederation in 1867, enlarged to the German Empire in 1871.

A chief supporter of Germanization was Otto von Bismarck, who in 1861 already wrote that he believed Poles to be like animals that need to be shot and exterminated (by physical genocide), and while he did not go as far as biological extermination of Poles after finding himself in position of power, he engaged in what Alexander Bramson in 1947 called "cultural genocide against Polish nation". He would later engage in policies that were precursors of 20th century ethnic cleansing and genocide. Edward Crankshaw writes that already at that time Bismarcks hostility to Poles bordered on "insanity" and was firmly entrenched in traditions of Prussian mentality and history, while he did not write or talked about it much it pre-occupied his mind vastly, there was little need for discussions in Prussian circles, as most of them including the king agreed with his views on Poles

In another letter from 1861 Bismarck stated: Every success of the Polish national movement is Prussia's failure; we can wage war on this element not based on the rules of civil justice but according to the laws of war. Polishness with all its characteristics should be judged not from the perspective of an objective humanism but as an enemy...There is no possibility of peace between us nor any attempts to resurrect Poland

Jerzy Zdrada describes how before 1848 a Prussian program was presented that envisioned removing Poles from all offices, courts, judiciary system, and local administration, controlling the clergy, and making peasants loyal through enforced military service. Schools were to be Germanized as well Those plans were supported by such prominent public figures such as Clauswitz, Gneisenau, Theodor von Schon, and Wilhelm von Humbold. At the same time the Prussian government and Prussian King pursued Germanization of administration and judicial system, while local officials enforced Germanization of educational system and tried to eradicate the economic position of Polish nobility In Bromberg (Bydgoszcz) the mayors were all Germans. In Posen, out of 700 officials, only 30 were Poles. Flotwell also initiated programs of German colonization and tried to reduce Polish landownership in favor of Germans. In the time period of 1832-1842 the number of Polish holdings was reduced from 1020 to 950 and the German ones increased from 280 to 400. When Frederick William IV's ascended to the throne in 1840, certain concessions were again granted, German colonization was halted, some schools were able to teach Polish language again, and promises were made to create departments of Polish language in universities in Breslau (Wrocław) and Berlin, there were also vague promises about creation of University in Posen.This was all that Poles were granted. In reality only the methods changed, while the overall goal of Germanization remained the same, only this time with lighter methods, and by concessions Prussians hoped to assure identification of Poles with Prussian state and eventual change of their identity. The legal rights of Polish subjects were gradually decreased and the Prussian judiciary continuously refused to allow Poles to create their own university; by 1830 the right to use Polish in courts and institutions was no longer respected and from 1832 Poles could no longer hold higher posts at the local administrative level(Landrat). While the Poles constituted the majority of population in the area, they held only 4 out of 21 official posts of higher level. In 1861 Otto von Bismarck wrote in a letter to his sister: "Hit the Poles so hard that they despair of their life; I have full sympathy for their condition, but if we want to survive we can only exterminate them."

As Christopher Clark writes only after the Uprising of 1848 the initial idea to ensure the loyalty of Polish subjects by a liberal policy was gradually replaced by a policy of Germanisation, however, calls of the German populace of Posen for their support remained unanswered by the Prussian government, legal rights of Polish subjects remained unaffected and the Prussian judiciary scrupulously defended the usage of Polish as administrative language and in elementary schooling. Especially in the years 1866 to 1869 Bismarck tried to appease the Polish clergy, he even chose to dismiss the President of the Province of Posen, Karl von Horn, in a conflict with Archbishop Ledóchowski.

According to Clark the Franco-Prussian War of 1870/71 and the following unification of Germany led to a shift of the government's principles regarding the Polish minority in Prussia. Throughout the war the Polish share of populace within the Province of Posen showed significant support for the French. Demonstrations at news of Prussian-German victories manifested Polish nationalist feelings and calls were also made for Polish recruits to desert from the Prussian Army — though these went mainly unheeded. Bismarck regarded these actions as an indication of a Slavic-Roman encirclement and a threat to unified Germany.

The Kulturkampf struggle against the Catholic Church and the Catholic southern German states started almost simultaneously with an extensive campaign of Germanisation in the Greater Poland lands formerly belonging to the Polish Crown. Therefore, the anti-Catholic elements of the Kulturkampf can be tied to Germanisation efforts involving language and culture within the empire.

== Actions of Minister Falk ==
After the Falk Laws (May Laws) had been passed, the Prussian authorities started to close down most of the religious-minded schools teaching the Polish language.

Instead, the German language schools were promoted. In November 1872 minister Falk ordered all classes of religion to be held in German by the spring of the following year. The wave of protests on the side of Polish Catholics and the clergy was pacified the following year, when the Catholic Seminaries of Posen (Poznań) and Gnesen (Gniezno) were closed down, and the state took up the supervision of education, previously carried out mostly in church-sponsored schools.

The estate of the Church was confiscated, monastic orders dissolved, and the paragraphs of the Prussian constitution assuring the freedom of the Catholics were removed. In the Province of Posen the Kulturkampf took on a much more nationalistic character than in other parts of Germany.

== Imprisonment of priests ==
Soon afterwards the Prussian authorities responded with repressions, with 185 priests imprisoned and several hundred others forced into exile. Among the imprisoned was the Primate of Poland Archbishop Mieczysław Ledóchowski. A large part of the remaining Catholic priests had to continue their service in hiding from the authorities. Although most of the imprisoned were finally set free by the end of the decade, the majority of them were forced into exile. Many observers believed these policies only further stoked the Polish independence movement.

Contrary to other parts of the German Empire, in Greater Poland - then known under the German name of Provinz Posen - the Kulturkampf did not cease after the end of the decade. Although Bismarck finally signed an informal alliance with the Catholic Church against the socialists, the policies of Germanization did continue in Polish-inhabited parts of the country.

== Attempt to bring German settlers ==
In 1886, the authorities of Prussia prepared a new policy of Germanisation of the provinces with a Polish population. According to Heinrich Tiedemann, the author of the plan, the reason why all earlier attempts at bringing more German settlers to the province failed was that they allegedly felt uncertain and alien there.

The proposed solution was to assure them of correctness of elimination of Poles from public life and land property, as well as to promote land acquisition by administrative means. The state-controlled Settlement Commission was to buy off land and estates from the local Poles and sell it, at a much lower price, to Germans. Although it managed to attract circa 22,000 families to the area, the overall percentage of Polish inhabitants of the land was not changed.

Similarly, the activities of the Eastern Marches Society met with little success. Instead, the German actions following the start of the Kulturkampf resulted in strengthening the Polish national awareness and creation of several nationalist organization similar to the ones created against Polish culture and economy.

By 1904, when the new law on settlement which effectively forbade Polish peasants from construction of new houses, the sense of national identity was strong enough to cause a period of civil unrest in the country. Among the notable symbols of the era were the children's strike of Września and the struggle of Michał Drzymała who effectively evaded the new law by living in a circus van rather than a newly built house.

== Ending of Germanization ==
Prussia's Germanisation policies in the Province of Posen ended with the fall of the German Empire as most of territories taken from Poland were returned to Polish rule after World War One. Although most of the administrative measures aimed against the Poles remained in force until 1918, between 1912 and 1914 only four Polish-owned estates were expropriated, while at the same time Polish social organizations successfully competed with German trade organizations and even started to buy land from the Germans.

The long-lasting effect of the Polish-German conflict in the area was development of a sense of Greater Polish identity, distinct from the identity common in other parts of Poland and primarily associated with nationalist ideas rather than socialism, prevailing in other parts of the country in the 20th century.

== Literature ==
- Lech Trzeciakowski - 1970 Kulturkampf w Zaborze Pruskim Poznan: Wydawnictwo Poznanskie: 1970
- Od Bismarcka do Hitlera: Polsko-niemieckie stosunki gospodarcze Czesław Łuczak Wydawnictwo Poznanskie, 1988
- Nazi Empire German Colonialism and Imperialism from Bismarck to Hitler Shelley Baranowski Cambridge University Press 2010
