= Germanisation of Poles during the Partitions =

German cultural policy in partitioned Poland (1815–1919)

A painting by Ludwik Stasiak depicting schoolchildren being punished for speaking Polish

After partitioning Poland at the end of the 18th century, the Kingdom of Prussia and later the German Empire imposed a number of Germanisation policies and measures in the newly gained territories, aimed at limiting the Polish ethnic presence and culture in these areas. This process continued through its various stages until the end of World War I, when most of the territories became part of the Second Polish Republic, which largely limited the capacity of further Germanisation efforts of the Weimar Republic until the occupation during World War II.

== Until the unification of Germany ==
Following the partitions, the Prussian authorities started the policy of settling German speaking ethnic groups in these areas. Frederick the Great, in an effort to populate his sparsely populated kingdom, settled around 300,000 colonists in all provinces of Prussia, most of which were of a German ethnic background, and aimed at a removal of the Polish nobility, which he treated with contempt.

He likened the newly conquered West Prussia to a Prussian Canada and its inhabitants (which were German and Polish) to the Iroquois, who he saw as equally uncivilised. Under Prussian rule, Poles were subject to a series of measures aimed against them and their culture; Polish was replaced by German as the official language and the land of several members of the Polish nobility was confiscated and given to German nobles.

=== 1815–1831 ===
The Prussian hold on Polish areas was somewhat weakened after 1807, where parts of its partition were given to the Duchy of Warsaw. The power status of Prussia was dependent on hindering any form of Polish statehood, due to the crucial position of Wielkopolska, Silesia and West Prussia; all areas with either a Polish majority or substantial Polish population. The Prussian state did not support Polish attempts at restoration of Poland during the Congress of Vienna, where it tried to regain the Duchy of Warsaw or at least its western provinces. In 1815, the Prussian king made several guarantees in his speech to Poles in the newly formed Grand Duchy of Posen (created out of the territories of the Duchy of Warsaw) in regards to rights of Polish language and cultural institutions. In order to ensure loyalty of the newly re-conquered territories, the Prussians engaged in several propaganda gestures hoping they would be enough to gain land-owners' and aristocratic support.

The base support of Prussian rule was from the influx of German officials and tradesmen, whose immigration started in 1772 due to Partitions of Poland, and while it was halted in 1806, it soon was reinstated after 1815 as planned systemic action of Prussian government. The Prussians knew exactly that Polish aspirations were involved with independence; however, they were considering at the time two different methods to subdue Polish resistance. One advocated ruthless Germanisation of the Polish provinces, the other pursued by Chancellor Hardenberg, wanted to gain support of Polish higher classes, while turning them away from Russian Tsar Alexander I.

Initially, the position of the Chancellor prevailed. At the same time, Prussians and Russians, through secret police, worked together against Polish movements that would seek independence either from Russia or Prussia, and Prussian representative in Warsaw helped to create political climate that would abolish constitutional freedoms in Congress Poland. The situation in Polish areas of Prussia was calmed down after a series of proclamations and assuring the Polish right to their education, religion and traditions. In the end, the Polish rights were defined very narrowly, and Prussia started to abolish Polish in administration, schooling, and courts. In 1819 the gradual elimination of Polish in schools began, with German being introduced in its place. This procedure was briefly stopped in 1822, but restarted in 1824.

In 1825 August Jacob, a politician hostile to Poles, gained power over newly created Provincial Educational Collegium in Posen (Poznań). Across the Polish territories, Polish teachers were being removed from work, German educational programs were being introduced, and primary schooling was being replaced by German one that aimed at the creation of loyal Prussian citizens. Already in 1816 the Polish gymnasium in Bromberg (Bydgoszcz) was turned into a German school and Polish was removed from classes.

In 1825 the Teacher's Seminary in Bromberg was Germanized as well. While in 1824 a Provincial Parliament was invoked in Greater Poland, the representation was based on a wealth census, meaning that the result gave most of the power to German minority in the area. Even when Poles managed to issue calls asking for enforcing of the guarantees formulated in treaties of Congress of Vienna and proclamations of Prussian King in 1815 they were rejected by Prussia. Thus, neither the attempt to create Polish University in Posen nor Polish Society of Friends of Agriculture, Industry and Education were accepted by authorities. Nevertheless, Poles continued to ask for Polish representation in administration of the area, representing the separate character of the Duchy, keeping the Polish character of schools.

From 1825, the increase in anti-Polish policies became more visible and intense. Prussian political circles demanded an end to the tolerance of Polishness. Among the Poles, two groups emerged, one still hoping for respect of separate status of the Duchy and insisting on working with Prussian authorities, hoping that in time they would grant some freedoms. The other faction still hoped for independence of Poland. As a consequence, many Polish activists were imprisoned. A joint operation of Russian and Prussian secret police managed to discover Polish organizations working in Breslau (Wrocław) and Berlin, whose members were arrested and detained in Prussian jails.

=== 1830–1848 ===
Intensification of anti-Polish policies started from 1830 onwards. As the November Uprising in Russian-held Congress Poland began, Prussians closely worked with Russia in regards to stopping any Polish independence drive. A state of emergency was introduced in the Duchy, police surveillance started on a large scale and 80,000 soldiers were moved into the area. The Prussian Foreign Minister openly declared that Prussia would oppose independence of Poland as it would mean territories taken in the Partitions of Poland could be claimed by it. Russian soldiers fighting Poles received food supplies, equipment, and intelligence from Prussia. While Prussian generals even wanted to march into Congress Poland, the threat of French intervention stopped those plans. The administrator of the region became Eduard Heinrich Flotwell, a self-declared enemy of Poles, who openly called for Germanisation and superiority of German culture over Polish people. Supported by Karl Grolman, a Prussian general, a program was presented that envisioned removing Poles from all offices, courts, judiciary system, and local administration, controlling the clergy, and making peasants loyal through enforced military service. Schools were to be Germanized as well. Those plans were supported by such prominent public figures such as Carl von Clausewitz, August Neidhardt von Gneisenau, Theodor von Schon, Wilhelm von Humboldt.

By 1830 the right to use Polish in courts and institutions was no longer respected. While the Poles constituted the majority of population in the province of Poznan, they held only 4 out of 21 official posts of higher level. From 1832 they could no longer hold higher posts at the local administrative level (Landrat). At the same time the Prussian government and Prussian King pursued Germanisation of administration and judicial system, while local officials enforced Germanisation of educational system and tried to eradicate the economic position of Polish nobility. In Bromberg the mayors were all Germans. In Posen, out of 700 officials, only 30 were Poles.

Flotwell also tried to reduce Polish landownership in favour of Germans. In the time period of 1832–1842 the number of Polish holdings was reduced from 1020 to 950 and the German ones increased from 280 to 400. The Jewish minority in the Province was seen by Prussians as a useful ally to gain support for their policies. The Prussians hoped that by granting Jews rights and abolishing old limitations, they could integrate Jewish population into German society, and gain a counterweight to Polish presence. As a result, many Jews saw in Prussia a free, liberal state and were opposed to the Polish independence movement.

When Frederick William IV ascended to the throne in 1840, certain concessions were again granted. The German colonization was halted, some schools were able to teach Polish again, and promises were made to create Polish departments in universities in Breslau and Berlin, there were also vague promises about the creation of a university in Posen. While the overall goal of Germanisation remained the same, the Prussian state hoped that by such concessions it could assure the identification of Poles with the Prussian state and an eventual change of their identity. The concessions were also connected to the freezing of relations between Prussia and the Russian Empire, with Prussian politicians hoping that Poles could be used to fight Russia on Prussia's behalf.

At this time the majority of Poles were not yet engaged in political activity. At most only the landowners, the intelligentsia and the upper urban classes possessed a developed national consciousness. The peasantry and the working class had yet to experience their own "Polish national awakening". Through military service and school education, and in the case of "regulated" peasants also in the wake of the benefits wrought by the final emancipation decree introduced in 1823, some segments of these social groups had begun to identify with the Prussian state. However, as German colonization grew in strength and policies against Polish religion and traditions were introduced the local population begun to feel hostility towards Prussia and German presence. Economic factors also began to influence Polish-German relations. Colonization policies in particular created a fear of German competition among Poles. The greatest difference remained the religious segregation. The local Germans displayed rather politically apathy and refrained from creating an organized form of social life. Prior to 1848, the provincial diet remained the only forum of German political activity. In general relations of the local Germans with the Polish population were good.

== 1871 until the Treaty of Versailles ==
Nationality map of eastern Germany in 1910

Within Bismarck's Kulturkampf policy, the Poles were purposefully presented as "foes of the empire" (German: Reichsfeinde). Bismarck himself privately believed that the only solution to Polish Question was the extermination of Poles. As the Prussian authorities suppressed Catholic services in Polish by Polish priests, the Poles had to rely on German Catholic priests. Later, in 1885, the Prussian Settlement Commission was set up from the national government's funds with a mission to buy land from Polish owners and distribute it among German colonists. In reaction to this the Poles also founded a commission of their own to buy farmland and distribute it to Poles. Eventually 22,000 German families were settled through the Prussian Settlement Commission in the province of Posen. In 1885, 35.000 Poles, who had immigrated from Austria and the Russian Empire and therefore had no German citizenship, were deported from Germany. This was further strengthened by the ban on building of houses by Poles (see Drzymała's van). Another means of the policy was the elimination of non-German languages from public life, schools and from academic settings. At its extremes, the Germanisation policies in schools took the form of abuse of Polish children by Prussian officials (see Września children strike). The harsh policies had the reverse effect of stimulating resistance, usually in the form of home schooling and tighter unity in the minority groups. In 1890 the Germanisation of Poles was slightly eased for a couple of years but the activities intensified again since 1894 and continued until the end of the World War I. This led to international condemnation, e.g., an international meeting of socialists held in Brussels in 1902 called the Germanisation of Poles in Prussia "barbarous". Nevertheless, the Settlement Commission was empowered with new more powerful rights, which entitled it to force Poles to sell the land since 1908, although it was only ever used in one instance.

== Germanisation of Poles in Ruhr area ==
Another form of Germanisation of Poles was the relation between the German state and Polish coal miners in the Ruhr area. Due to migration within the German Empire, an enormous stream of Polish nationals (as many as 350,000) made their way to the Ruhr in the late 19th century, where they worked in the coal and iron industries. Because of the various uprisings in occupied Poland during the previous century, German authorities viewed them as potential danger and a threat and as a "suspected political and national" element. All Polish workers had special identity cards and were under constant observation by German authorities. In addition, anti-Polish stereotypes were promoted, such as postcards with jokes about Poles, presenting them as irresponsible people, similar to the treatment of the Irish in New England around the same time. The vilification was mutual, with Polish rhymes often characterizing the Germans as dogs or less than human. Many Polish traditional and religious songs were forbidden by Prussian authorities . Their citizens' rights were also limited by the German state. In response to these policies, the Polish formed their own organizations to defend their interests and ethnic identity. The Sokół sports clubs and the workers' union Zjednoczenie Zawodowe Polskie (ZZP), Wiarus Polski (press) and Bank Robotników were among the best known such organizations in the area. At first the Polish workers, ostracised by their German counterparts, had supported the Catholic Centre Party. Since the beginning of the 20th century their support more and more shifted towards the social democrats. In 1905 Polish and German workers organized their first common strike. Under the German law of changing surnames (German: Namensänderungsgesetz) a significant number of "Ruhr-Poles" had to change their surnames and Christian names to Germanised forms, in order to evade ethnic discrimination. Increasing intermarriage between Germans and Poles also contributed much to the Germanisation of ethnic Poles in the Ruhr area.

== Germanisation plans during First World War ==
During the First World War, the German Empire planned to annex up to 35,000 square kilometers of pre-war Congress Poland and ethnically cleanse between 2 and 3 million Poles and Jews out of these territories to make room for German settlers.

== Reversal of Germanisation after end of German rule over Polish territories ==
After World War I ended, the Germanisation of those Polish territories which were restored to Poland was largely reversed, although significant German minorities continued to exist.

The American historian of German descent Richard Blanke in his book Orphans of Versailles names several reasons for the exodus of the German population. The author has been criticised by Christian Raitz von Frentz and his book classified by him as part of a series on the subject that have an anti-Polish bias. Polish professor A. Cienciala says that Blanke's views in the book are sympathetic to Germany.

- A number of former settlers from the Prussian Settlement Commission who settled in the area after 1886 in order to Germanise it were in some cases given a month to leave, in other cases they were told to leave at once.
- Poland found itself under threat during the Polish-Bolshevik war, and the German population feared that Bolshevik forces would control Poland. Migration to Germany was a way to avoid conscription and participation in the war.
- State-employed Germans such as judges, prosecutors, teachers and officials left as Poland did not renew their employment contracts. German industrial workers also left due to fear of lower-wage competition. Many Germans became economically dependent on Prussian state aid as it fought the "Polish problem" in its provinces.
- Germans refused to accept living in a Polish state. As Lewis Bernstein Namier said: "Some Germans undoubtedly left because they would not live under the dominion of a race which they had previously oppressed and despised."
- Germans feared that the Poles would seek reprisals after over a century of harassment and discrimination by the Prussian and German state against the Polish population.
- Social and linguistic isolation: while the population was mixed, only Poles were required to be bilingual. The Germans usually did not learn Polish. When Polish became the only official language in Polish-majority provinces, their situation became difficult. The Poles shunned Germans which contributed to their isolation.
- Lower standards of living. Poland was a much poorer country than Germany.
- Former Nazi politician and later opponent Hermann Rauschning wrote that 10% of Germans were unwilling to remain in Poland regardless of their treatment, and another 10% were workers from other parts of the German Empire with no roots in the region.

Official encouragement by the Polish state played a secondary role in the exodus. While there were demonstrations and protests and occasional violence against Germans, they were at a local level, and officials were quick to point out that they were a backlash against former discrimination against Poles. There were other demonstrations when Germans showed disloyalty during the Polish-Bolshevik war as the Red Army announced the return to the prewar borders of 1914. As many as 80% of Germans emigrated more or less voluntarily.

=== Reversal of Germanisation in Poznan ===
County (German name in brackets)	ethnic German population (1910)	ethnic German population (1926)	ethnic German population (1934)	decline (absolute numbers)	decline (percent)
Odolanów (Adelnau)	17,148	10,038	9,442	−7,706	−44.9
Międzychód (Birnbaum)	16,012	4,655	4,377	−11,635	−72.7
Bydgoszcz (Bromberg, town)	74,292	11,016	10,021	−64,271	−86.5
Bydgoszcz (Bromberg, district)	31,212	13,281	12,211	−19,001	−60.9
Czarnków (Czarnikau)	17,273	5,511	4,773	−6,500	−57.7
Gniezno (Gnesen)	26,275	8,616	7,876	−18,399	−70.0
Gostyń (Gostyn)	6,528	2,395	2,162	−4,366	−66.9
Grodzisk Wielkopolski (Grätz) / Nowy Tomyśl (Neutomischel)	33,244	16,576	16,555	−16,689	−50.2
Inowrocław (Hohensalza)	28,394	8,455	8,096	−20,298	−71.5
Jarocin (Jarotschin) / Pleszew (Pleschen)	15,436	4,667	4,019	−11,417	−74.0
Kępno (Kempen) / Ostrzeszów (Schildberg)	16,631	9,310	10,889	−5,742	−34.5
Chodzież (Kolmar)	34,004	14,246	12,348	−21,656	−63.7
Koźmin (Koschmin) / Krotoszyn (Krotoschin)	21,542	6,542	5,807	−15,735	−73.0
Leszno (Lissa)	31,033	9,917	8,371	−22,662	−73.0
Mogilno (Mogilno) / Strzelno (Strelno)	21,711	8,727	7,770	−13,941	−64.2
Oborniki (Obornik)	22,450	9,417	8,410	−14,040	−62.5
Poznań (Posen, town)	65,321	5,980	4,387	−60,934	−93.3
Poznań (Posen, district)	21,486	4,687	4,252	−17,234	−80.2
Rawicz (Rawitsch)	21,842	6,184	5,038	−16,804	−76.9
Szamotuły (Samter)	17,071	5,029	4,841	−12,230	−71.6
Śmigiel (Schmiegel) / Kościan (Kosten)	11,775	3,636	3,488	−8,287	−70.4
Śrem (Schrimm)	10,017	2,802	3,574	−6,443	−64.3
Środa Wielkopolska (Schroda)	6,201	2,269	2,029	−4,172	−67.3
Szubin (Schubin)	21,035	10,193	8,879	−12,156	−57.8
Wyrzysk (Wirsitz)	34,235	13,495	12,410	−21,825	−63.8
Wolsztyn (Wollstein)	22,236	10,369	9,313	−12,923	−58.1
Wągrowiec (Wongrowitz)	16,309	8,401	7,143	−9,166	−56.2
Września (Wreschen)	7,720	2,436	2,115	−6,505	−72.6
Żnin (Znin)	10,906	5,404	4,539	−6,367	−58.4
Poznań Voivodship (total)	679,339	224,254	203,135	−468,204	−68.9

=== Reversal of Germanisation in Pomerania ===
County (German name in brackets)	ethnic German population (1910)	ethnic German population (1926)	ethnic German population (1934)	decline (absolute numbers)	decline (percent)
Kościerzyna (Berent)	20,804	6,884	5,974	−14,830	−71.3
Wąbrzeźno (Briesen)	24,007	7,615	7,344	−16,663	−69.4
Chełmno (Kulm)	23,345	7,905	7,673	−15,672	−67.1
Tczew (Dirschau)/ Gniew (Mewe)/ Świecie (Schwetz)	70,279	20,446	17,571	−52,708	−75.0
Grudziądz (Graudenz, town)	34,194	3,542	3,875	−30,319	−88.7
Grudziądz (Graudenz, district)	28,698	9,317	8,190	−20,508	−71.5
Kartuzy (Karthaus)	14,170	4,800	3,927	−10,243	−72.3
Chojnice (Konitz)	30,326	9,022	8,070	−22,256	−73.4
Lubawa (Löbau)	12,122	2,078	1,689	−10,433	−86.1
Wejherowo (Neustadt)/ Puck (Putzig)	24,528	6,556	6,305	−18,223	−74,3
Starogard Gdański (Pr. Stargard)	17,165	2,909	3,418	−13,747	−80.1
Toruń (Thorn, town)	30,509	2,255	2,057	−28,452	−93.3
Toruń (Thorn, district)	27,757	7,107	6,738	−21,019	−75.7
Tuchola (Tuchel)	11,268	3,170	2,861	−8,407	−74.6
Sępólno Krajeńskie (Zempelburg)	21,554	10,866	11,130	−10,424	−48.4
Pomeranian Voivodship (total)	421,033	117,251	107,555	−313,347	−74.5

== See also ==
- Germanisation in Poland (1939–1945)
- Germanisation of the Province of Posen
- Expulsion of Poles by Germany
- Russification of Poles during the Partitions
