= Drzymała's wagon =

- wóz Drzymały
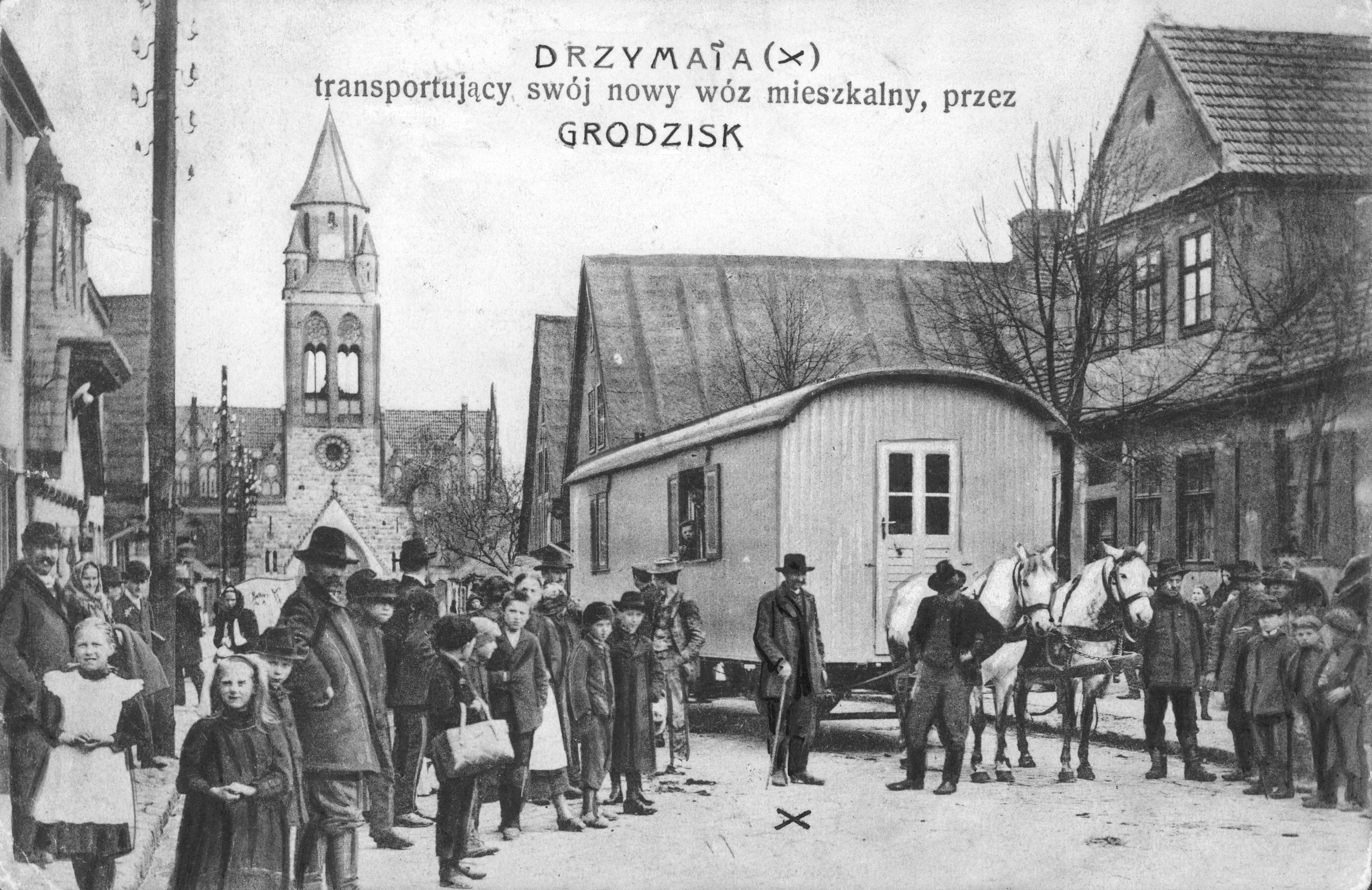
- Drzymała's wagon in Grodzisk Wielkopolski (Grätz), 1908

General information
- Type: House on wheels
- Owner: Michał Drzymała

Drzymała's wagon (Polish: wóz Drzymały) was a house on wheels purchased by peasant Michał Drzymała as a protest against the German Empire's policy of Germanisation in its majority Polish territories. Drzymała was able to circumvent German building regulations by moving his home a short distance every day, thanks to which he became a Polish folk hero.

In 1886, by resolution of the Prussian Landtag, the Prussian Settlement Commission was established to encourage German settlement in the provinces of Posen and West Prussia, annexed by Prussia as a result of the Partitions of Poland. The Commission was empowered to acquire vacant property of the Polish szlachta and sell or lease it to German settlers. The Prussian government regarded this as a measure designed to counteract the Ostflucht and reduce the number of Poles, most of whom saw the establishment of the Commission as an aggressive measure designed to drive them away from their lands.

The campaign against Polish land ownership largely missed its aims and produced strong opposition from local Poles, including Drzymała, who in 1904 purchased a plot of land in Pogradowitz in the Posen district of Bomst, but found that the newly implemented Prussian Feuerstättengesetz ("furnace law") enabled local officials to deny him permission to build a permanent dwelling with an oven on his land. The law considered any place of stay a house if it stayed in one place for more than 24 hours. To bypass the rule, Drzymała set himself up in a former circus caravan and tenaciously defied in the courts all attempts to remove him for several years – every day, he moved the wagon a short distance, thereby exploiting a loophole and avoiding any legal penalties, until in 1909 he was able to buy an existent farmhouse nearby.

The case attracted publicity all over Germany. The German Kulturkampf measures and the Prussian Settlement Commission ultimately resulted in stimulating the Polish national sentiment that they had been designed to suppress.

== See also ==
- Pruska kultura
- Anti-Polish sentiment
- Germanisation of Poles during the Partitions
- Kulturkampf
- Spite house
