= Hermann Kennemann =

Hermann Kennemann-Klenka (1815–1910) was a Prussian politician and landowner, co-founder of the German Eastern Marches Society. He was notable as one of the main supporters of Germanization of Polish lands then ruled by German Empire.

Kennemann was born in Soldin (modern Myślibórz, Poland), he used to be one of the members of various Prussian economical and political organisations in the Province of Posen. Among them was the Society for Support of German Interests founded after the failed January Uprising and then the Junker Society founded in 1865.

In 1894, together with Ferdinand von Hansemann and Heinrich von Tiedemann, he created the Society for Support of Germanness in the Eastern Territories, later renamed the German Eastern Marches Society. Although Kennemann was considered one of the leaders of the German nationalist movement in the area, his age and the influence of the society's chief, Tiedemann, made his influence over its fate largely symbolic. However, he remained its member and one of the sponsors until his death in 1910.
