= Bund Deutscher Osten =

Anti-Polish German Nazi organisation

The Bund Deutscher Osten (BDO; English: "Federation of the German East") was an anti-Polish German Nazi organisation founded on 26 May 1933. The organisation was supported by the Nazi Party. The BDO was a national socialist version of the German Eastern Marches Society, which was closed down by the Nazis in 1934. It promulgated the idea of the "German East", an irredentist concept that attempted to deny the very existence of Poland and the Polish people's right to live there.

The Reichsleiter of the Bund Deutscher Osten between 1933 and 1937 was Theodor Oberländer. In May 1933, when Passau founded its own association, school superintendent Wilhelm Leidl became its leader.

== See also ==
- Kulturkampf
- Kirchenkampf
- Germanisation
- Ostflucht
- Anti-Polish sentiment

== Bibliography ==
- Karol Fiedor, Bund Deutscher Osten w systemie antypolskiej propagandy, Instytut Śląski w Opolu, Warszawa–Wrocław 1977
- Philipp–Christian Wachs "Der Fall Theodor Oberländer (1905–1998): Ein Lehrstück deutscher Geschichte", Frankfurt/Main; New York Campus–Verl. 2000, ISBN 3-593-36445-X
