= Ruhrpolen =

Polish community in the Ruhr area in the 19th and 20th centuries

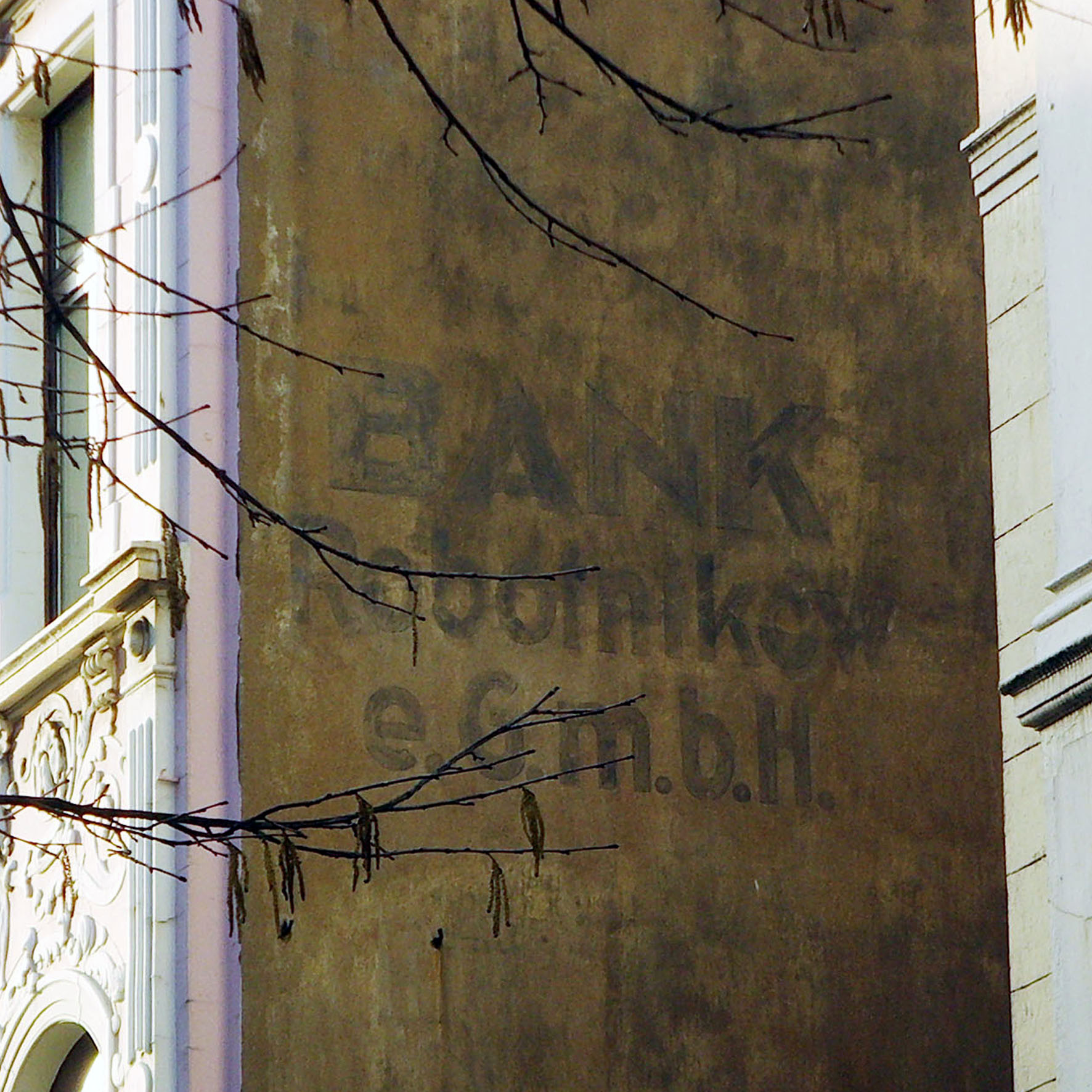
Old inscription for the Polish workers bank in Bochum, Bank Robotników e.G.m.b.H.

Ruhrpolen (German: [ˈʁuːɐ̯ˌpoːlən], “Ruhr Poles”) is a German umbrella term for the Polish migrants and their descendants who lived in the Ruhr area in western Germany since the 19th century. The Poles (including Masurians, Kashubians, Silesians, and other groups) migrated to the rapidly industrializing region from Polish-speaking areas of the German Empire.

== Origins ==
The immigrants mainly came from what was then eastern provinces of Germany (Province of Posen, East Prussia, West Prussia, Province of Silesia), which were acquired by the Kingdom of Prussia in the late-18th-century Partitions of Poland or earlier, and which housed a significant Polish-speaking population. This migration wave, known as the Ostflucht, began in the late 19th century, with most of the Ruhrpolen arriving around the 1870s. The migrants found employment in the mining, steel and construction industries. In 1913 there were between 300,000 and 350,000 Poles and 150,000 Masurians. Of those, one-third were born in the Ruhr area. The Protestant Masurians did not accept being identified with Catholic Poles and underlined their loyalty to Prussia and the German Empire.

== German Empire ==
The first Polish organization Jedność was founded in 1876 in Dortmund by bookseller Hipolit Sibilski. In 1890, Wiarus Polski, the first Polish newspaper in the region, was established in Bochum. Various Polish organizations were founded in the region, including Towarzystwo św. Michała ("St. Michael's Club") in 1888, Związek Polaków w Niemczech ("League of Poles in Germany") in 1894, a regional branch of the "Sokół" Polish Gymnastic Society in 1898, and Zjednoczenie Zawodowe Polskie ("Polish Professional Union") in 1902. Dozens of Polish bookstores were founded in various places, including Dortmund, Bochum, Herne, Witten, Recklinghausen, Oberhausen, Habinghorst (present-day district of Castrop-Rauxel), Ückendorf (present-day district of Gelsenkirchen), Bruckhausen and Laar (present-day districts of Duisburg). There were also various Polish companies, co-operative shops, banks, sports clubs and singing clubs. In 1904, the Dziennik Polski daily newspaper was founded in Dortmund, and in 1909 the Narodowiec newspaper was founded in Herne. The two most successful and popular football clubs of the Ruhr region, FC Schalke 04 and Borussia Dortmund, were co-founded by Poles, and the former was even mockingly called the Polackenverein ("Polack club") by the Germans because of its many players of Polish origin.

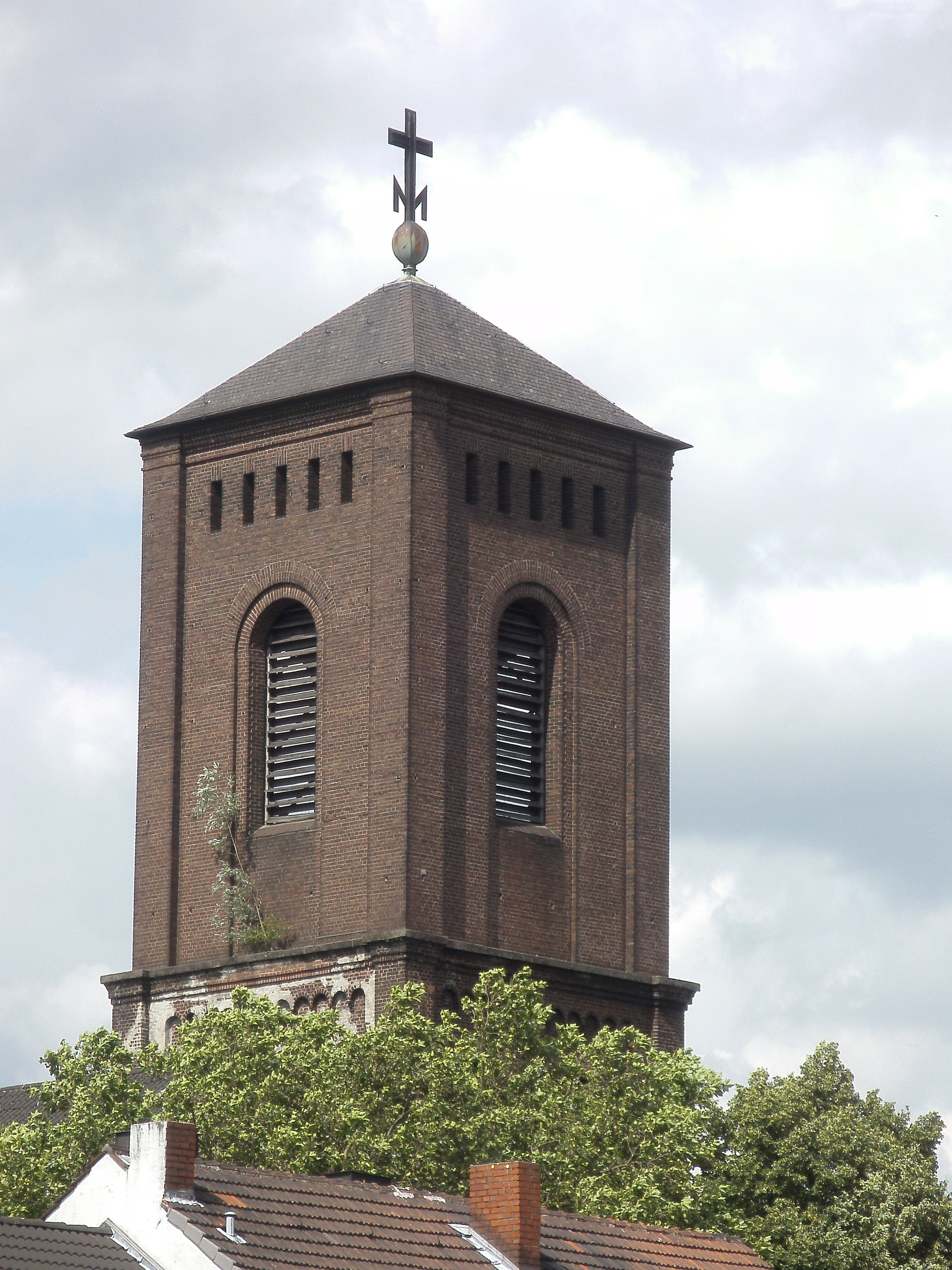
Tower of the former Polish monastery in Bochum before demolition in 2012

The main center of the Polish community of the Ruhr area was Bochum, and since 1905, many organizations and enterprises were based at Am Kortländer Street, which was hence nicknamed "Little Warsaw". The former Redemptorist Monastery in Bochum, which was closed down by the Prussian government during the Kulturkampf in 1873, was reopened and became a Polish religious center.

The rights of the Ruhrpolen as citizens were restricted in many ways by anti-Polish policies of the German Empire. While initially German officials hoped that the Polish population would succumb to Germanization, they eventually lost hope that the long-term strategy would succeed. Polish schools had their accreditation refused, and state schools no longer took account of ethnic diversity. In schools with a high percentage of Polish-speaking students, German officials split up the students. When parents tried to organise private lessons for their children, police would come to their homes. Germany banned the use of the Polish language in schools (since 1873), in mines (since 1899), and at public gatherings (since 1908). Polish publishing houses and bookstores were often searched by the German police, and Polish patriotic books and publications were confiscated. Polish booksellers whose books were confiscated were sentenced by German courts to fines or prison. In 1909, the Central Office for Monitoring the Polish Movement in the Rhine-Westphalian Industrial Districts (Zentralstelle fur Uberwachung der Polenbewegung im Rheinisch-Westfalischen Industriebezirke) was established by the Germans in Bochum.

Other measures included instructing teachers and officials that their duty was to promote a German national consciousness. A decree was issued that ordered all miners to speak German. Discrimination started to affect issues of basic existence. The Settlement Law of 1904 made it difficult for Poles who wished to return east to purchase land. In 1908, laws discriminating against the Polish language were applied to the entire German Empire.

In response to harassment by Prussian authorities, the organisations of Ruhr Poles expanded what had been their purely cultural character and restored their links with Polish organisations in the east. The League of Poles in Germany, founded at Bochum in 1894, merged with the ''Straż'' Movement set up in 1905. In 1913, the combined group formed an executive committee, which worked alongside the Polish National Council. Poles also demanded Polish priests and mass services in Polish.

== Interbellum and World War II ==
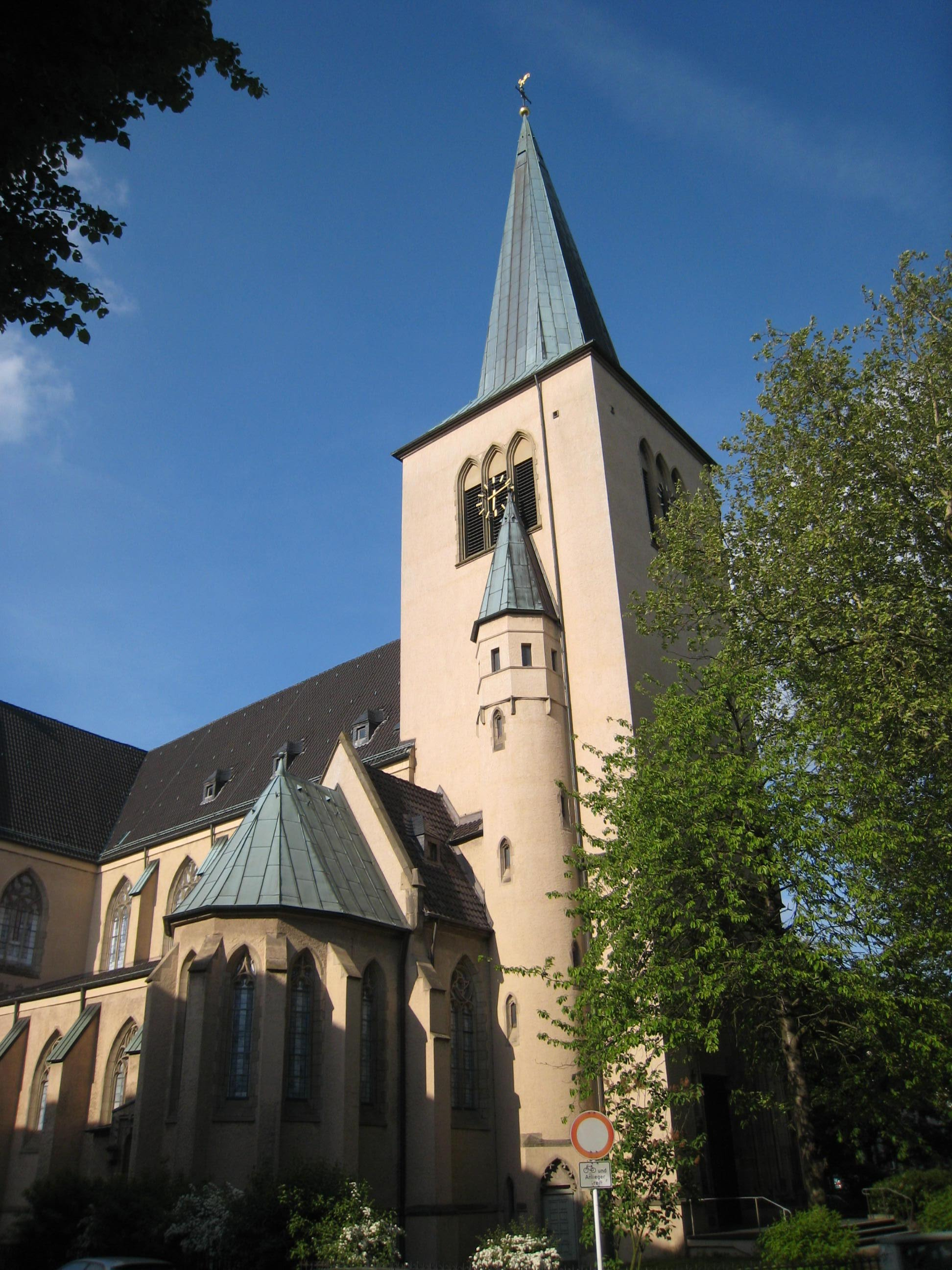
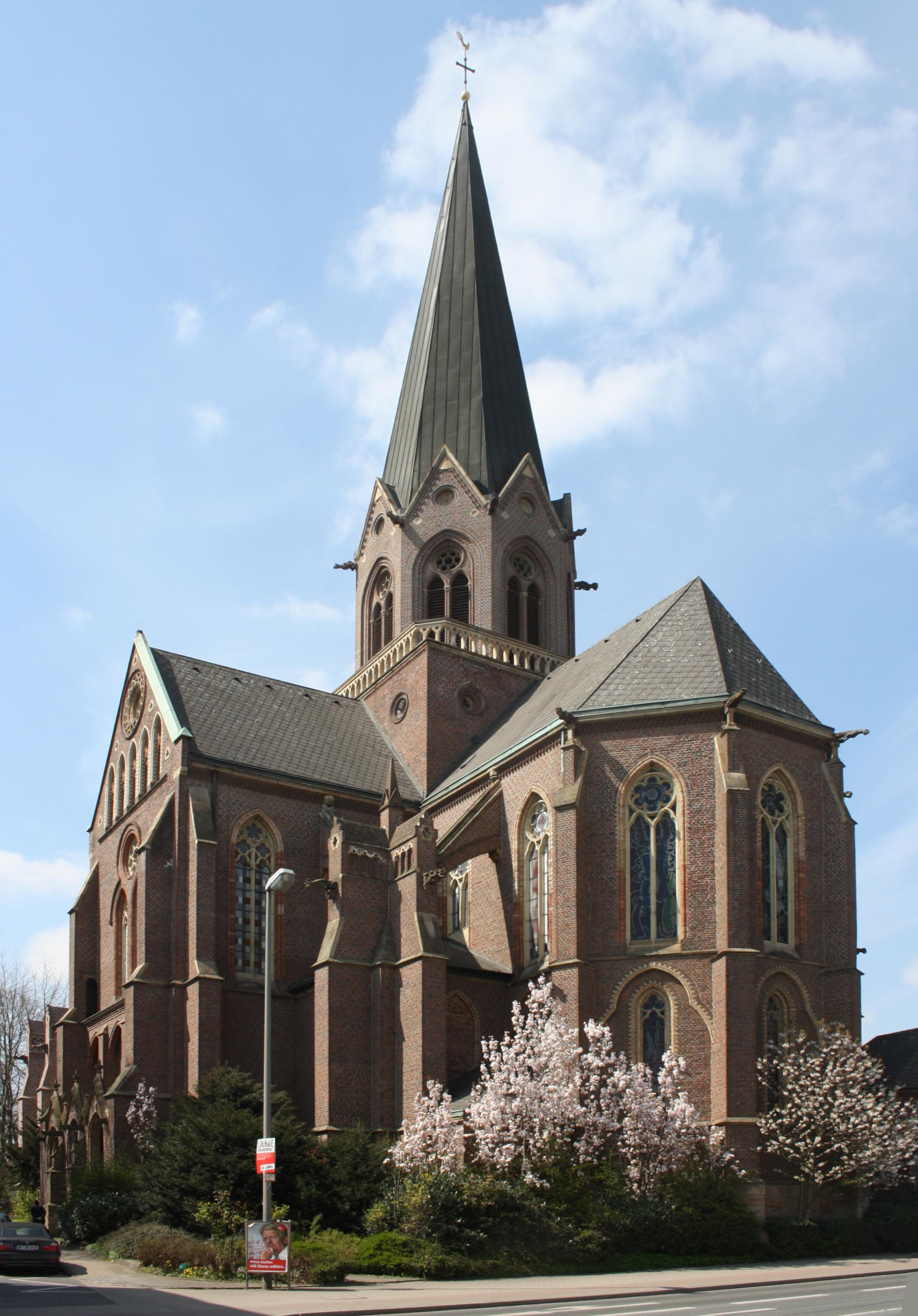
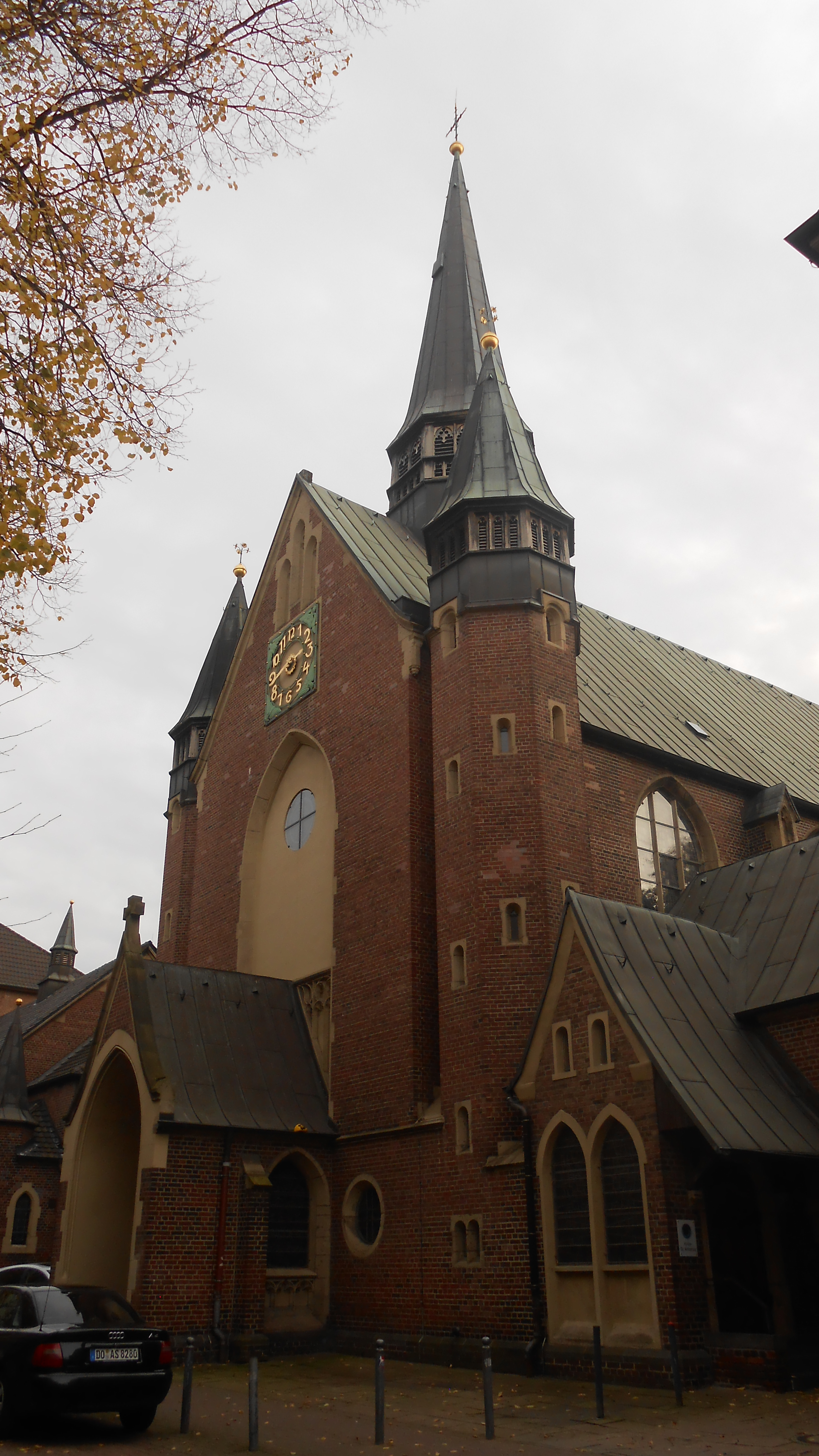
Churches of Saint Barbara, Saint Clara and Saint Anthony, three of Dortmund's ten churches where Polish-language services were held

After the end of World War I and the rebirth of independent Poland, many Poles left the region and returned to Poland, although a sizeable community stayed. To take care of the remaining Polish population in the region and to facilitate the return of Poles to Poland, a Polish Vice-Consulate was established in Essen in 1920, later elevated into a consulate, and eventually moved to Düsseldorf in 1936. In the interbellum, the main Polish newspaper of the Ruhr Poles was Naród, issued in Herne since 1921, whereas Wiarus Polski, the oldest Polish newspaper of the Ruhr, was moved to Poznań, Poland in 1923. Bochum was the headquarters of the Third District of the Union of Poles in Germany, which covered not only Westphalia and Rhineland, within which the Ruhr is located, but also Baden and the Palatinate. Polish church services were held in numerous churches, often in multiple churches in the same cities (as in Bochum, Castrop, Dortmund, Duisburg, Essen, Gelsenkirchen, Herne, Lünen and Oberhausen), however, in the interbellum they were gradually limited, prohibited or cancelled. In 1934, the last Polish councilman was removed from the Bottrop city council. According to 1935 estimates, Polish organizations in Westphalia and Rhineland had 21,500 members.

In early 1939, there were no anti-Polish riots in the Ruhr area, although Nazi Germany increased both its invigilation of Polish activists and organizations, and the censorship of Polish press. Polish activists, expecting a German attack, secured the files of Polish organizations. On 15 July 1939, the Gestapo entered the headquarters of the Union of Poles in Germany in Bochum, searched it and interrogated its chief Michał Wesołowski. The Nazis then carried out mass searches of Polish organizations in the region and interrogated Polish activists, however, they did not obtain the desired lists of Polish activists, which had been previously hidden by Poles. Nazi terror and persecutions rapidly intensified. The Nazis limited freedom of assembly, increased censorship and confiscated Polish press for reporting on the persecution and arrests of Poles. In response, many Poles from the region came to Bochum for organizational and information meetings. On 24 August 1939, the Gestapo, under threat of arrest, demanded 30 leading Polish activists to appear at the Gestapo station in Bochum and present lists of members of Polish organizations, but again to no avail. Due to increasing German repressions, many Polish organizations suspended public activity.

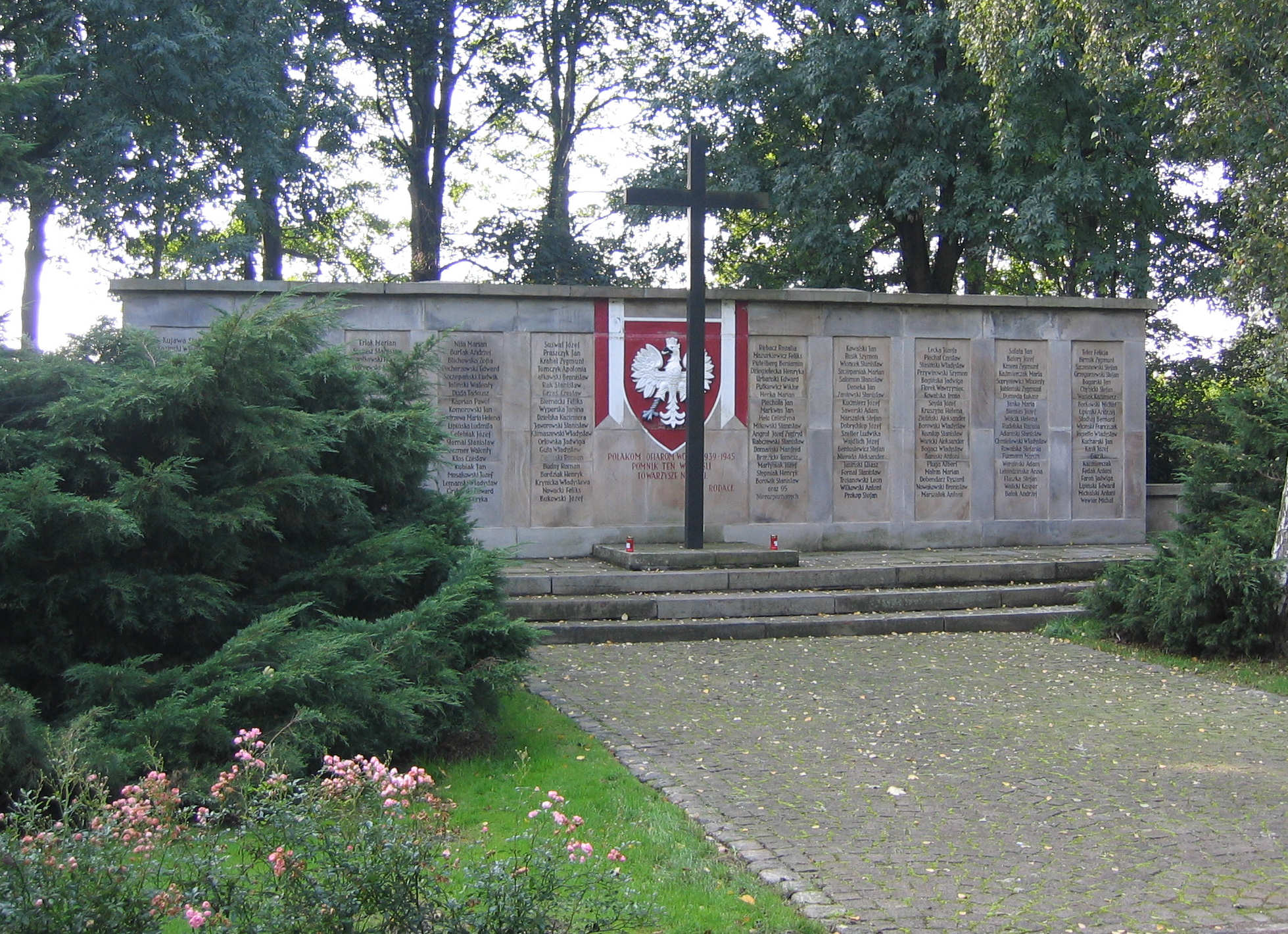
Mass grave of Polish victims of Nazi Germany in Dortmund

After the outbreak of the Second World War, all remaining Polish organizations in the Ruhr faced dissolution by the Nazis. On 11 September 1939, 249 leading Polish activists from the Ruhr were arrested and then placed in concentration camps. At least 60 of them were murdered for their activities by Nazi Germany. Headquarters of Polish organizations and premises in Bochum were looted and expropriated by Nazi Germany. The Gestapo closed the Polish monastery in Bochum, which was then converted into a transit camp for people deported from German-occupied Lithuania. It was destroyed during air raids in 1943, rebuilt afterwards, and eventually demolished in 2012. Shortly before demolition, the church bells were sent to Poland.

Polish men and women from German-occupied Poland were deported by the Germans to slave labour in the region, including to the subcamps of the Buchenwald concentration camp in Bochum, Dortmund, Essen, Unna and Witten.

== Aftermath ==
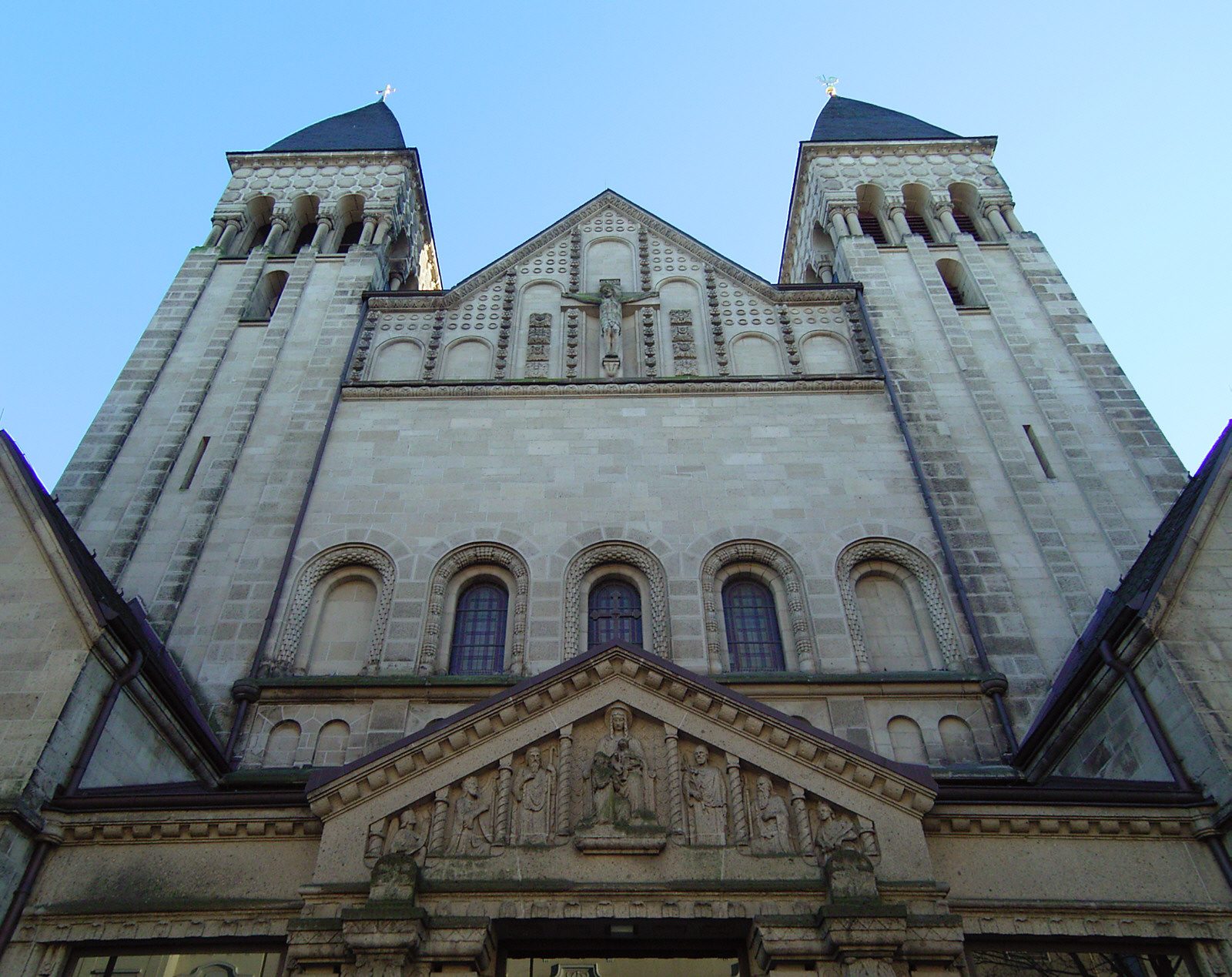
Saint Anne church of the Polish Catholic Mission in Dortmund, in which Polish-language services are held daily

It is estimated that in modern times, some 150,000 inhabitants of the Ruhr Area (out of roughly five million) are of Polish descent.

== Notable people ==
- Rüdiger Abramczik (1956-), footballer and coach
- Edward Adamczyk (1921-1993), Olympic athlete
- Stefan Arczyński (1916-2022), photographer
- Herbert Burdenski (1922-2001), footballer and coach
- Stefan Głogowski (1910-1948), Home Army officer
- Leon Goretzka (1995-), footballer
- Florian Grzechowiak (1914-1972), basketball player
- Daniel Jasinski (1989-), discus thrower
- Julian Jasinski (1996-), basketball player
- Erich Juskowiak (1926-1983), footballer
- Ernst Kalwitzki (1909-1991), footballer
- Edmond Kasperski (1923-2005), footballer
- Gerd Kasperski (1949- 2008), footballer
- Erich Kempka (1910-1975), Adolf Hitler's chauffeur.
- Edward Klinik (1919-1942), Polish resistance member in German-occupied Poland, blessed of the Catholic Church
- Stanislaus Kobierski (1910-1972), footballer
- Willi Koslowski (1937-2024), footballer
- Barbara Książkiewicz (1913-2001), athlete
- Ernst Kuzorra (1905-1990), footballer
- Heinz Kwiatkowski (1926-2008), footballer
- Reinhard Libuda (1943-1996), footballer
- Stanisław Mikołajczyk (1901-1966), politician, Prime Minister of the Polish government-in-exile during World War II
- Hans Nowak (1937-2012), footballer
- Matthias Ostrzolek (1990-), footballer
- Aleksander Polus (1914-1965), boxer
- Emil Rothardt (1905-1969), footballer
- Günter Sawitzki (1932-2020), footballer
- Fritz Szepan (1907-1974), footballer
- Horst Szymaniak (1934-2009), footballer
- Franciszek Szymura (1912-1984), boxer
- Hans Tibulski (1909-1976), footballer
- Otto Tibulski (1912-1991), footballer
- Hans Tilkowski (1935-2020), footballer
- Adolf Urban (1914-1943), footballer
- Stefan Wapniarek (1916-1940), Polish Air Force pilot
- Édouard Wawrzyniak (1912-1991), footballer

== Bibliography ==
- Leksykon Polactwa w Niemczech (in Polish). Opole: Związek Polaków w Niemczech. 1939.
- Chojnacki, Wojciech (1981). "Księgarstwo polskie w Westfalii i Nadarenii do 1914 roku". Studia Polonijne (in Polish). No. 4. Lublin: Towarzystwo Naukowe KUL.
- Cygański, Mirosław (1984). "Hitlerowskie prześladowania przywódców i aktywu Związków Polaków w Niemczech w latach 1939-1945". Przegląd Zachodni (in Polish) (4).
