= German Eastern Marches Society =

Historical german nationalist group

German Eastern Marches Society (German: Deutscher Ostmarkenverein, also known in German as Verein zur Förderung des Deutschtums in den Ostmarken) was a German radical, extremely nationalist xenophobic organization founded in 1894. Mainly among Poles, it was sometimes known acronymically as Hakata or H-K-T after its founders von Hansemann, Kennemann and von Tiedemann. (Note: The nickname itself may have been influenced by the name Hecate.) Its main aims were the promotion of Germanization of Poles living in Prussia and destruction of Polish national identity in German eastern provinces. Contrary to many similar nationalist organizations created in that period, the Ostmarkenverein had relatively close ties with the government and local administration, which made it largely successful, even though it opposed both the policy of seeking some modus vivendi with the Poles pursued by Chancellor Theobald von Bethmann Hollweg and Leo von Caprivi's policies of relaxation of anti-Polish measures. While of limited significance and often overrated, the organization formed a notable part of German anti-democratic pluralist part of the political landscape of the Wilhelmine era.

Initially formed in Posen, in 1896 its main headquarters was moved to Berlin. In 1901 it had roughly 21,000 members, the number rose to 48,000 in 1913, though some authors claim the membership was as high as 220,000. After Poland was re-established following World War I in 1918, the society continued its rump activities in the Weimar Republic until it was closed down by the Nazis in 1934 who created the new organisation with similar activities called the Bund Deutscher Osten.

You are facing the most dangerous,
fanatic enemy of German existence, German honour
and German reputation in the world: The Poles.

== Background ==
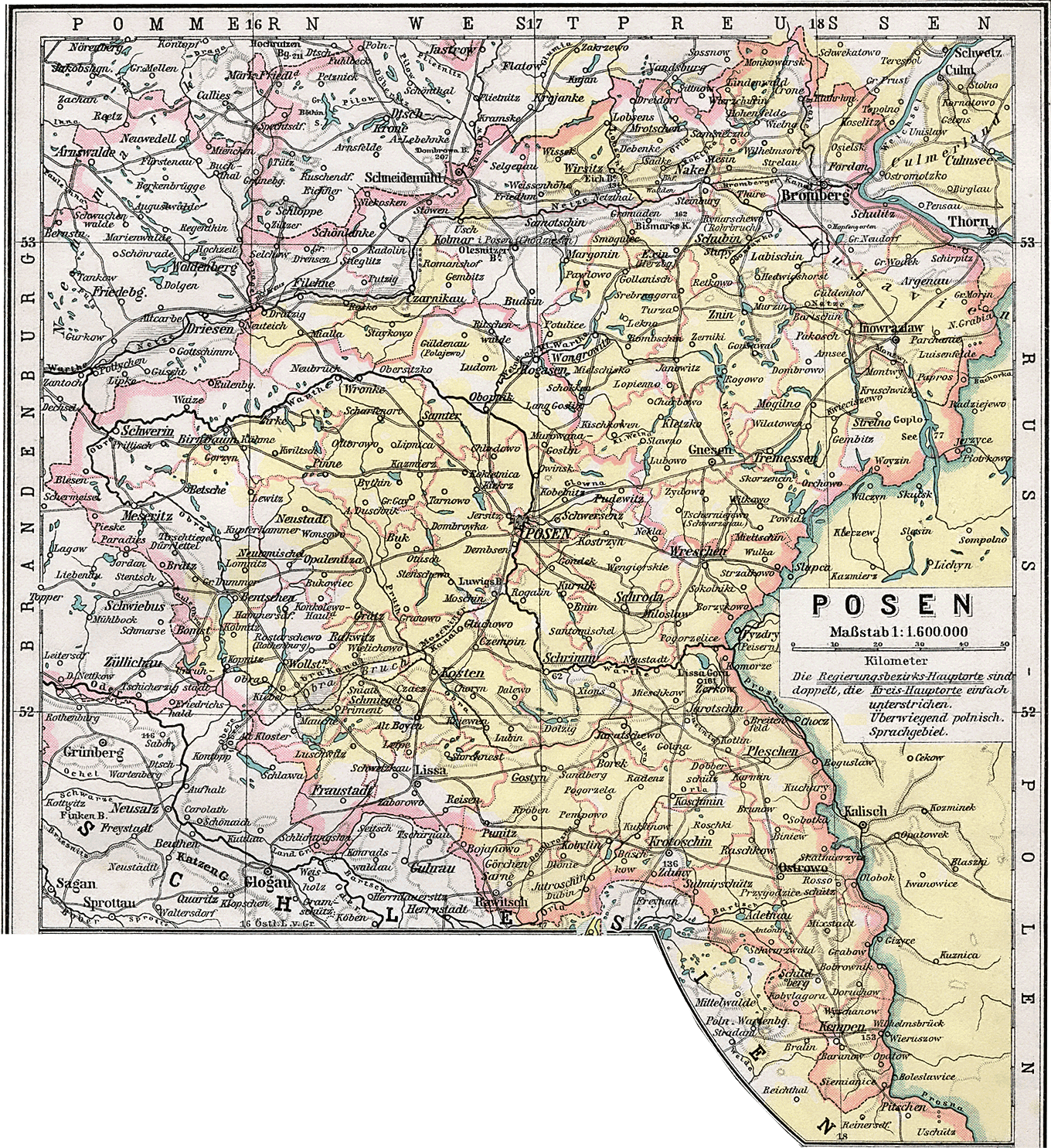
German 1905 map showing the extent of the Polish-speaking majority in Greater Poland

Following the Partitions of Poland in late 18th century, a large part of the former Polish–Lithuanian Commonwealth (namely the regions of Greater Poland and Royal, the later West Prussia) was annexed by the Kingdom of Prussia, the predecessor of the German Empire, which was formed in 1871. Primarily inhabited by Poles, Greater Poland initially was formed into a semi-autonomous Grand Duchy of Posen, granted with a certain level of self-governance. However, under Otto von Bismarck's government, the ethnic and cultural tensions in the region began to rise. This was paired by growing tendencies of nationalism, imperialism, and chauvinism within the German society. The tendencies went in two different directions, but were linked to each other. On one hand, a new world order was demanded with desires of creating a German colonial empire. And on the other, feelings of hostility towards other national groups within the German state were growing.

The situation was further aggravated by Bismarck's policies of anti-Catholic Church Kulturkampf that in Posen Province took on a much more nationalistic character than in other parts of Germany and included a number of specifically anti-Polish laws that resulted in the Polish and German communities living in a virtual apartheid. Many observers believed these policies only further stoked the Polish independence movement. There is also a question regarding possible personal antipathy towards Poles behind Bismarck's motivation in pursuing the Kulturkampf. (Note: As evidenced by some of his remarks and speeches, for instance the one to the Lower House of the Prussian Parliament of January 28, 1886, in: Eugen Kalkschmidt (ed.). Bismarcks Reden (in German). Berlin: Deutsche Bibliothek. pp. 173–186.) Unlike in other parts of the German Empire, in Greater Poland—then known under the German name of Provinz Posen—the Kulturkampf did not cease after the end of the decade. Although Bismarck finally signed an informal alliance with the Catholic Church against the socialists, the policies of Germanization did continue in Polish-inhabited parts of the country. However, with the end of von Bismarck's rule and the advent of Leo von Caprivi, the pressure for Germanisation was lessened and many German landowners feared that this would lead to lessening the German control over the Polish areas and in the end deprive Germany of what they saw as a natural reservoir of workforce and land. Although the actual extent of von Caprivi's concessions towards the Poles was very limited, the German minority of Greater Poland feared that this was a step too far, and that von Caprivi's government would cede the power in Greater Poland to the Polish clergy and nobility. The Hakata slogan was: "You are standing opposite to the most dangerous, fanatic enemy of German existence, German honour and German reputation in the world: The Poles."

== Society ==
Under such circumstances a number of nationalist organizations and pressure groups was formed, all collectively known as the nationale Verbände. Among them were the Pan-German League, German Navy League, German Colonial Society, German Anti-Semitic Organization, and the Defence League. Many landowners feared that their interests would not be properly represented by those organizations and decided to form their own society. It was officially launched November 3, 1894, in Poznań, then referred to under its German name of Posen. The opening meeting elected an assembly and a general committee composed of 227 members, among them 104 from the Province of Posen and Province of West Prussia, and additional 113 from other parts of German Empire. The social base of the newly founded society was wide and included a large spectrum of people. Some 60% of the representatives of areas of Germany primarily inhabited by Poles were the Junkers, the landed aristocracy, mostly with ancient feudal roots. The rest were all groups of middle class Germans, that is civil servants (30%), teachers (25%), merchants, craftsmen, Protestant priests, and clerks.

The official aims of the society was "strengthening and rallying of Germandom in the Eastern Marches through the revival and consolidation of German national feeling and the economic strengthening of the German people" in the area. This was seen as justified due to alleged passivity of Germans in the eastern territories. Officially it was to work for the Germans rather than against the Poles. However, in reality the aims of the society were anti-Polish and aimed at ousting the Polish landowners and peasants from their land at all cost. It was argued that the Poles were an insidious threat to German national and cultural integrity and domination in the east. The propagandistic rationale behind formation of the H-K-T was presented as a national Polish-German struggle to assimilate one group into the other. It was argued that either the Poles would be successfully Germanized, or the Germans living in the east would face the Polonization themselves. This conflict was often portrayed as a constant biological struggle between the "eastern barbarity" and "European culture". To counter the alleged threat, the Society promoted the destruction of Polish national identity in the Polish lands held by Germany, and prevention of polonization of the Eastern Marches, that is the growing national sentiment amongst local Poles paired with migration of Poles from rural areas to the cities of the region.

In accordance with the views of Chancellor von Bismarck himself, the Society saw the language question as a key factor in determining one's loyalty towards the state. Because of this view, it insisted on extending the ban on usage of the Polish in schools, to other instances of everyday life, including public meetings, books, and newspapers. During a 1902 meeting in Danzig (modern Gdańsk), the Society demanded from the government that Polish be banned even from voluntary classes in schools and universities, that the language be banned from public use, and that Polish-language newspapers be either liquidated or forced to be printed in bilingual versions.

With limited local success and support, the Ostmarkenverein functioned primarily as a nationwide propaganda and pressure group. Its press organ, the Die Ostmark (Eastern March) was one of the primary sources of information on the Polish Question for the German public and shaped the national-conservative views towards the ethnic conflict in the eastern territories of Germany. The Society also opened a number of libraries in the Polish-dominated areas, where it supported the literary production of books and novels promoting an aggressive stance against the Poles. The popular Ostmarkenromane (Ostmark novels) depicted Poles as non-white and struggled to portray a two race dichotomy between "black" Poles and "white" Germans

However, it did not limit itself to mere cultural struggle for domination but also promoted a physical removal of the Poles from their lands in order to make space for the German colonization. The pressure of the H-K-T indeed made the government of von Caprivi adopt a firmer stance against the Poles. The ban on Polish schools was reintroduced and all teaching was to be done in German. The ban was also used by the German police to harass the Polish trade union movement as they interpreted all public meetings as educational undertakings.

An important issue was the colonisation of Polish territory: the organisation actively supported the nationalist policy of Germanisation through removal of Polish population and promoting settlement of ethnic Germans in the eastern regions of the German Empire. It was among the main supporters of creation of the Settlement Commission, an official authority with a fund to buy up the land from the Poles and redistribute it among German settlers. Since 1905 the organisation also proposed and lobbied for a law that would allow forced eviction of Polish owners of land, and succeed in 1908 when the law was eventually passed. However, it remained on paper in the following years, to which the H-K-T responded with large scale propaganda campaign in the press. The campaign proved to be successful and on October 12, 1912, the Prussian government issued a decision allowing eviction of Polish property owners in Greater Poland.

== Social base ==
Although the H-K-T is primarily associated with the Junkers, it was one of the groups to oppose the Society's goals the most. Initially treated with reserve by most of the conservative Prussian aristocracy, with time it became actively opposed by many of them. The Society opposed any immigration of Poles from the Russian Poland to the area, while the Junkers gained large profits from seasonal workers migrating there every year, mostly from other parts of Poland. Also the German colonists brought to formerly Polish lands by the Settlement Commission or the German government largely benefited from the cooperation with their Polish neighbours and mostly either ignored the Hakatisten or even actively opposed their ideas. This made the Ostmarkenverein an organization formed mostly by the German bourgeoisie and settlers, that is middle class members of the local administration, and not the Prussian Junkers. Other notable group of supporters included the local artisans and businessmen, whose interests were endangered by the organic work, that is the Polish response to the economical competition promoted by the Settlement Commission and other similar organizations. In a sample probe of H-K-T's members, the social classes represented were as follows:

- 26.6% of civil servants and members of German administration
- 17.6% of artisans
- 15.7% of businessmen
- 14.0% of teachers
- 10.7% of landowners
- 4.2% of clergymen
- 2.7% of army officers
- 0.7% of rentiers
- 6.5% of other professions
- 1.3% of people with no designation

== Effects and after-life ==
=== In Poland ===
By 1913 the Society had roughly 48,000 members. Despite its fierce rhetoric, support from the local administration and certain popularity of its goals, the Society proved to be largely unsuccessful as were the projects it promoted. Much like other similar organizations, the H-K-T not only managed to incite some public awareness to the Polish Question within German public and radicalise the German policies in the area, but also sparked a Polish reaction. As an effect of the external pressure, the Poles living in the German Empire started to organize themselves in order to prevent the plans of Germanisation. In addition, the main opposition centre on the Polish side became the middle class rather than aristocracy, which strengthened the Polish resistance and intensified the national sentiment within the Polish society. Also, the pressure from the German nationalists resulted in strengthening the Polish national-democrats, particularly the Polish National-Democratic Party of Roman Dmowski, and Wojciech Korfanty.

For instance, the Settlement Commission throughout the 27 years of its existence managed to plant about 25,000 German families on 1,240 km^{2} (479 mi^{2}) of land in Greater Poland and Pomerania. However, at the same time the reaction of Polish societies resulted in about 35,000 new Polish farmers being settled in the area of roughly 1,500 km^{2} (579 mi^{2}) of land. Similarly, the attempts at banning the teaching of religion in Polish met with a nationwide resistance and several school strikes that sparked a campaign in foreign media.

=== In Germany ===
All in all, even though the H-K-T Society was not the most influential, and its exact influence on the German governments is disputable, it was among the best-heard and for the Polish people became one of the symbols of oppression, chauvinism, and national discrimination, thus poisoning the Polish-German relations both in the borderland and in entire Germany. On the eve of World War I the nationalisms on both sides ran high and the liberal politicians who were seeking some compromise with the German Empire were seen as traitors, while German politicians trying to tone down the aggressive rhetoric on both sides were under attack from the Hakatisten. This situation proved vital to the failure of German plans of creation of Mitteleuropa during the Great War, as the Polish political scene was taken over mostly by politicians hostile to Germany.

=== Post-war organisation ===
The works of the Ostmarkenverein practically ceased during the war. At its end, some of its members joined the Deutsche Vereinigung (German Association), a society that aimed at preventing newly restored Poland from acquiring the lands that were formerly in Prussia. Many more of its members feared possible Polish reprisals after the take-over of Greater Poland, Pomerania and Silesia, and were among the first to pack their belongings and head westwards after the armistice, while others stayed in the lands that were taken over by Poland, protected by the Minority Treaty. Even though the Ostmarkenverein had lost its main rationale as Germany had no influence over the lands of the Republic of Poland, it continued to exist in a rump form. Headed from Berlin, it tried to force the government of the Weimar Republic to use the threat of reprisals against the remaining Polish minority in Germany in order to win further concessions for the German minority in Poland. However, the post-war government of Gustav Stresemann mostly rejected the pleas as there were many more Germans in Poland than Poles in Germany, and such a tit-for-tat tactics would harm the German side more. The Society continued to exist in Berlin, limiting its activities mostly to a press campaign and rhetoric, but its meaning was seriously limited. Finally, after the advent of Adolf Hitler's rule in Germany, it was disbanded by the Nazis. Some of its former members, now living in Poland, remained members of other German societies and organizations, and formed the core of the German Fifth column during the German Invasion of Poland of 1939.

== See also ==
- Kulturkampf
- Germanisation
- Ostflucht
- Anti-Polish sentiment
