= Michał Drzymała =

Polish folk hero

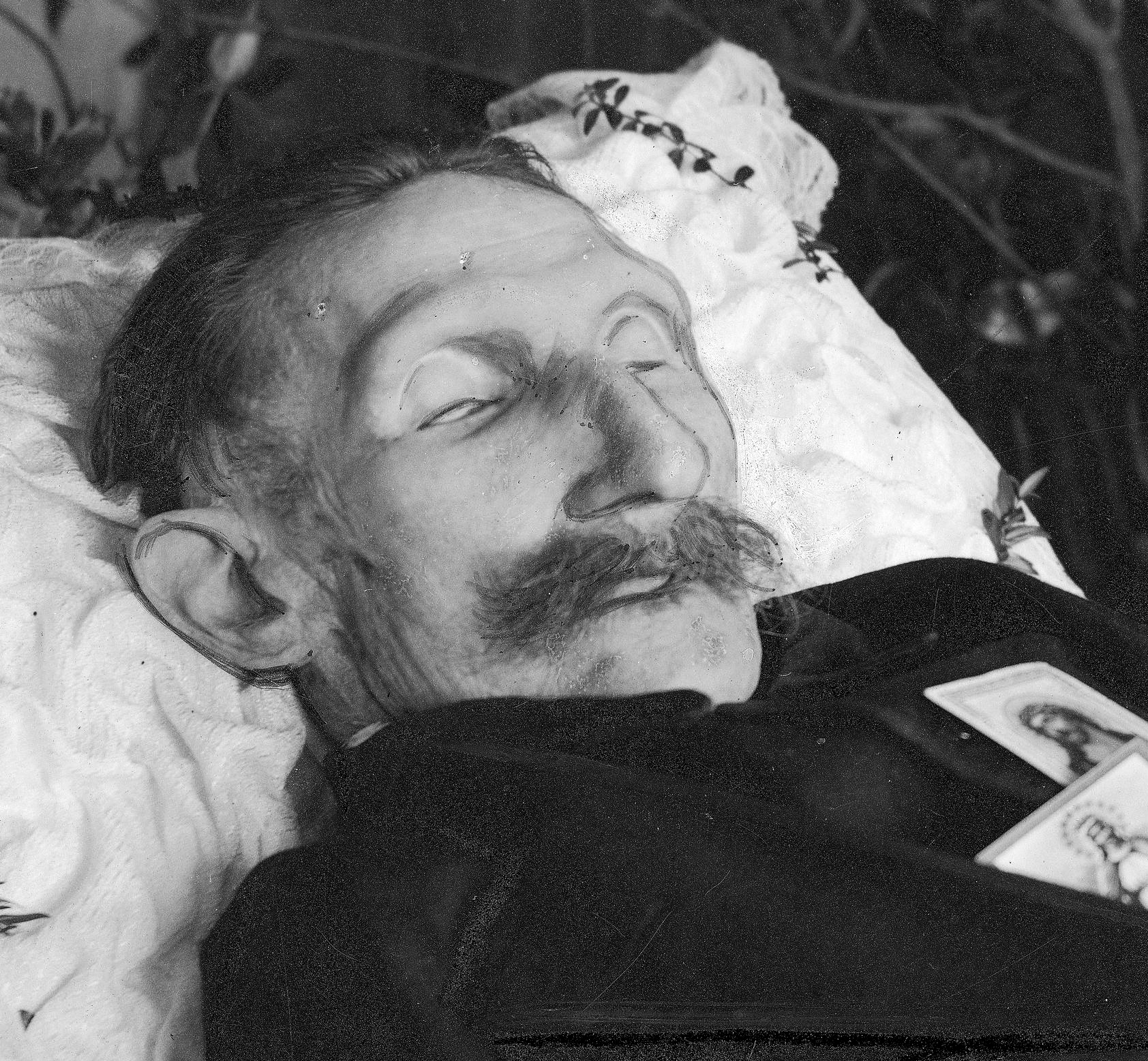
- Post-mortem photograph of Michał Drzymała, 29 April 1937
- Born: September 13, 1857; Zdrój, Kingdom of Prussia
- Died: April 25, 1937 (aged 79); Grabówno, Poland
- Occupation: Peasant
- Known for: Drzymała's wagon

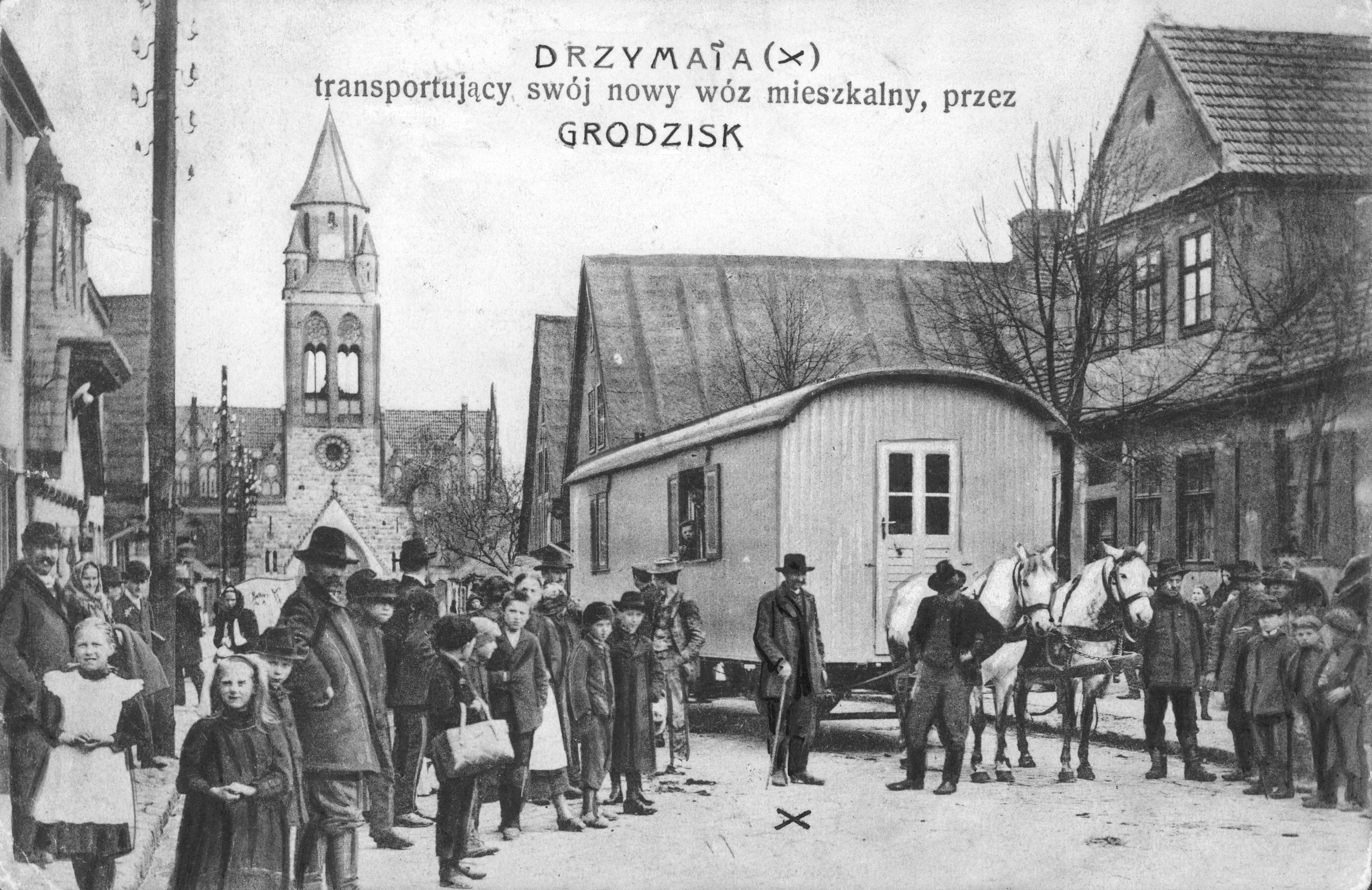
Michał Drzymała with his wagon in Grodzisk Wielkopolski (1908)

Michał Drzymała (Polish: [ˈmixaw dʐɨˈmawa]; 13 September 1857 – 25 April 1937) was a Polish peasant living in the Greater Poland region (or the Province of Posen), under Prussian and German rule.

He is viewed as a Polish folk hero due to his resistance to the local Prussian administration and its Germanization policies.

Drzymała was a Polish peasant, who had spent most of hife landless (or very land-poor), and had been working as a carriage driver for a wealthy local German merchant in Kaisertreu: "loyal to the Kaiser" formally renamed from Podgradowice in 1871 on German unification, which coincided with the initation of the Kulturkampf and intensified Germanization).

In 1904, the local Prussian authorities denied him permission to build a house on a cheap, disused parcel of land which he had just purchased using wages saved for that purpose, refusing his "settlement permit".

In Prussian state law, there had been a process of discretionary residential construction and conversion permits since 1876. However 1904, an amendment was promulgated, which stipulated that all such permits within the "West Prussia Province" (in the historic region of Eastern Pomerania) as well as the Province of Posen must be approved by the local Regierungspräsident (subject directly to the province head, the Oberpräsident) from the point of view of concordance with the goals of 1886 Germanization law which created the Prussian Settlement Commission, ie. it has to be in line with the 1886 bill's stated goal of "strengthening of the German element".

In response to the refusal of the permit, Drzymała purchased a circus wagon and turned it into his home. At the time, the law considered any dwelling a house if it remained stationary for more than 24 hours. Drzymała used the mobility of the wagon to exploit the law and to avoid the negative consequences by moving the wagon each day and thus preventing a legal basis for the authorities to penalize him.

His dwelling became known as Drzymała's wagon (Wóz Drzymały), and gained notoriety when this case was described by the Polish and European newspapers, with major Polish literary figures like Maria Konopnicka, Henryk Sienkiewicz and Bolesław Prus, as well as Lev Tolstoy commenting on the case, and ridiculing the Prussian and German state. It also ebnrgized the Poles living under its rule.

In the years of his endeavour, became a source of inspiration and began a trend of imitators, "Drzymalites" (Drzymalici), one of the paths by which Polish peasants circumvented the openly discriminatory Prussian regulations, in particular in the West Prussia Province. Those included Franciszek Pepliński in (known as the "Kashubian Drzymała") and Augustyn Pawelczyk in Grzybno Górne, both in Kashubia, Jan Sternicki from the region around Brodnica, as well as a certain Kowalski from Piwnice, near Toruń.

The authorities continued harassment with legal suits and administrative injunctions, including on the basis of residential building height requirements. In 1908, as his case gained notoriety, he was donated a larger and more comfortable wagon specially ordered from the Dzieciuchowicz & Laube carriage and harness factory in Poznań.

In the end, after a protracted judicial and administrative battle, the wagon was removed on the basis of minor faults, and Drzymała (together with his family) came to live in a mud hut on the premises. This in turn was demolished in 1910, nominally on the basis of fire safety regulations as it contained unsecured furnaces. After the court verdict and demolition, Drzymała sold the land and purchased a parcel with an already constructed residential dwelling

The newer wagon was taken into custody by a group of sympathizers, eventually being sold to Józef Butyński of Prądnik Czerwony in 1922 (the earlier auction offer to the new National Museum of Poland in 1921 was rejected).

In the January of 1928, the President of Poland, Ignacy Mościcki granted Drzymała a one-time gift of 10460 złoty for the purchase of a new land parcel.

On the 13th of March 1939, the village which had been the site of his permit battle was renamed Drzymałowo in his honour by the Polish authorities.

== See also ==
- Pruska kultura
- pl:Zbigniew Drzymała
