= Drzymałowo =

- Village
- Location within Poland
- Coordinates: 52°10′N 16°18′E
- Country: Poland
- Voivodeship: Greater Poland
- County: Grodzisk
- Gmina: Rakoniewice

Drzymałowo [dʐɨmaˈwɔvɔ] is a village in the administrative district of Gmina Rakoniewice, within Grodzisk County, Greater Poland Voivodeship, in west-central Poland.

Throughout its history the village has been renamed several times. Before the 1793 partition, it was called Podgradowice. Then Pogradowitz when the area was part of the German Empire. In 1905, the name of the village was officially changed to Kaisertreu. In 1919 after the territory was restored to Poland, the village reverted to its old name Podgradowice. In 1939, the village was rechristened Drzymałowo in honour of local folk hero Michał Drzymała, but shortly thereafter the Germans annexed the territory and the village again returned to Germany. The Name was changed to Volkstreu to avoid the word Kaiser . After the war the name Drzymałowo once again became official.
