= Ostflucht =

19th–20th-century migration of Germans from eastern to western regions of Germany

The Ostflucht (German: [ˈɔstflʊxt]; "flight from the East") was the migration of Germans, in the later 19th century and early 20th century, from areas which were then eastern parts of Germany to more industrialized regions in central and western Germany. The migrants originated in East Prussia, 'West Prussia', Silesia, Pomerania and the territory Province of Posen; they moved to provinces along the Rhine and Ruhr rivers. Most of the migrants were ethnic Germans, but many migrants to the Ruhr were of Polish ethnicity, later known as Ruhrpolen.

== Causes ==
The United States, which had been the major destination of emigrants from the German East, lost much of its attraction with the closing of the American frontier and the end of large-scale land runs in the 1890s. At the same time, the Ruhr area prospered, leading to high demand for labor, especially in coal mining and heavy industries. This led to an East-to-West migration within the Kingdom of Prussia. Through 1907, 2,300,000 people emigrated from Prussia's eastern provinces (Pomerania, West Prussia, East Prussia, Posen, and Silesia), while only 358,000 migrated into these provinces. Among the emigrants were 600,000 Poles. This loss of workforce hit farms, which made up for this by calling in seasonal workers from further east. Berlin and Brandenburg in the same time gained 1,200,000 inhabitants, while the Ruhr area and surrounding provinces (Westphalia and Palatinate) gained 640,000 people.

At the same time, increased immigration into the eastern German regions by Poles from western Russia caused imbalances and upheavals there, especially in Upper Silesia.

== Reactions ==
The emigration of Germans, and the higher Polish birth rate in the eastern provinces caused concern among German nationalists. This led to some special measures:

- limiting sale of estates to Germans only,
- encouraging Germans to immigrate to the Prussian state,
- creating an Ansiedlungskommission ("Settlement Commission") funded by the state, that aimed at buying land from ethnic Poles and selling it to Germans,
- instituting rules which required an ethnic Pole to apply for approval (rarely given) to build a new house on a newly acquired farm.

The sociologist Max Weber first came to public attention in Germany as a result of his study of the Ostflucht and of methods of combatting it, carried out on behalf of the Verein für Socialpolitik.

== See also ==
- Drang nach Osten
- Drzymała's wagon
- Kulturkampf
- Landflucht
- Polonophobia
