= Heinrich von Tiedemann =

German politician (1840–1922)

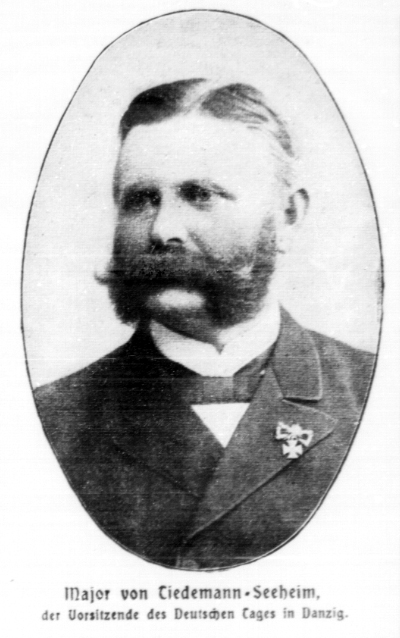
Heinrich von Tiedemann

Heinrich von Tiedemann (1840–1922) was a Prussian politician, co-founder of the German Eastern Marches Society (German: Deutscher Ostmarkenverein).

Tiedemann was born in Dembogorsch (Dębogórze, Poland), he died in Berlin.
