= Prussian Settlement Commission =

Government body for Germanization of Polish lands

Coordinates: 52°24′34″N 16°55′09″E

The Prussian Settlement Commission, officially known as the Royal Prussian Settlement Commission for West Prussia and Posen (German: Königlich Preußische Ansiedlungskommission für Westpreußen und Posen; Polish: Królewska Komisja Osadnicza dla Prus Zachodnich i Poznańskiego) was a Prussian government commission that operated between 1886 and 1924, although actively only until 1918. It was set up on the initiative of German chancellor Otto von Bismarck to employ both political and economic means to increase ethnic German land ownership and decrease that of Poles in two of Prussia's eastern provinces, West Prussia and Posen.

The commission was a prime instrument in Prussia's policy of Germanisation of the historically Polish lands that had been part of Poland before the Polish partitions of the late 18th century. Its primary focus was on buying large Polish estates, breaking them up and settling Germans on the land. When it ceased active operations in 1918, a total of just under 22,000 German families out of a planned 40,000 had been settled. To counteract the commission's activities, Poles used what has been termed "defensive nationalism". They set up Polish banks and local land acquisition cooperatives to put additional land in Polish hands. By the time the commission ended its work, more German-owned land had come under Polish control than was transferred from Polish to German ownership.

After World War I, when the Second Polish Republic was established, it refused to recognize the ownership rights of most of the German settlers, about half of whom fled or were driven out of Poland. All of the affected territory became part of the Polish People's Republic after World War II.

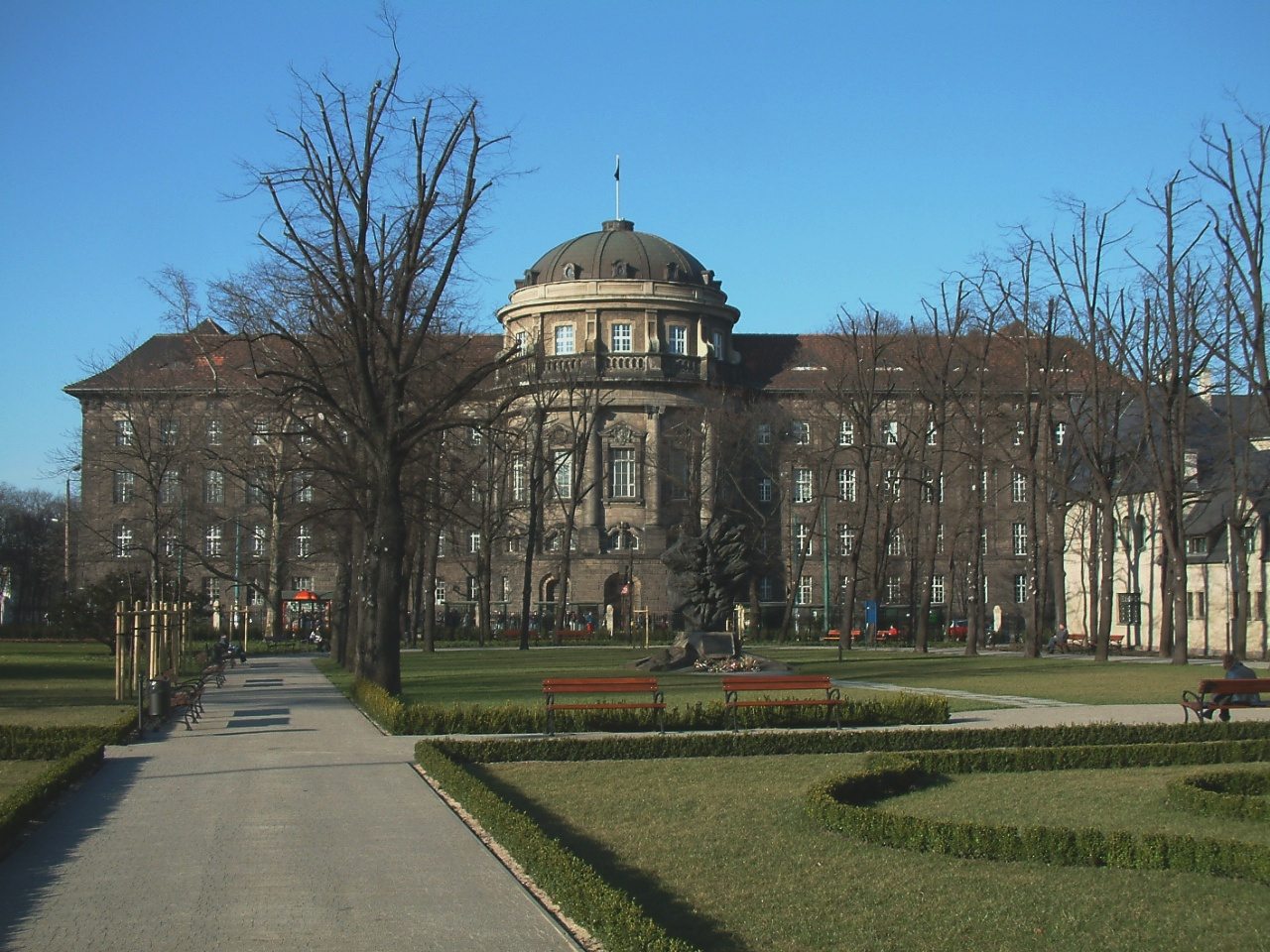
Former seat of the Prussian Settlement Commission, now Poznań University's Collegium Maius

== Name ==
English translations of the commission's name include German Colonisation Commission for Poznań, Prussian Colonization Commission, and The Royal Commission of Colonization for West Prussia and Posnania. The majority of Polish sources translate the title as Colonization Commission rather than Settlement Commission, which is more politically charged. The issue of translation is also connected to the fact that in 1904 the legal difference between settlement and colony was abolished in Prussia.

== Background ==
=== Kingdom of Prussia ===
During the partitions of Poland, the Kingdom of Prussia acquired West Prussia in 1772 and the later Province of Posen in 1793. Frederick the Great, who treated Poles with contempt and called them "slovenly Polish trash", settled around 300,000 Germans in the eastern provinces of Prussia and aimed at a removal of the Polish nobility. Land they owned was confiscated and given to German nobles. He placed Germans in most of the administration, and Polish was replaced by German as the official language. After Prussia's defeat in the Napoleonic Wars, the territory became part of the Duchy of Warsaw, a client state of revolutionary France. The 1815 Congress of Vienna, which re-ordered Europe following Napoleon's downfall, restored the western part of the duchy to Prussia, with the remainder going to the Russian Empire. In 1815 the Prussian king, Frederick William III, made several guarantees to Poles in the newly formed Grand Duchy of Posen regarding Polish cultural institutions and the right to use the Polish language.

The right to use Polish in courts and institutions was respected only until 1830. While the Poles constituted the majority of the population in the area, they held only four of 21 high-level official posts. Despite the German settlements between 1793 and 1806, in 1815 only 11.1 per cent of the population of Poznań was ethnically German. After 1832, Poles could no longer hold high posts at the local administrative level (such as Landrat). At the same time, the Prussian government and Prussian king pursued Germanisation of the administrative and judicial systems, while local officials enforced Germanisation of the educational system and tried to undermine the economic position of Polish nobility. The provincial parliament issued calls to ensure the right to use the Polish language and called for the creation of Polish educational institutions as well as autonomy, but those requests were rejected by the Prussian state. In 1847, 257 Polish activists were imprisoned on charges of conspiracy and eight of them were sentenced to death, but the outbreak of the Revolution of 1848 stopped the executions. The Frankfurt Parliament refused to accept the rights of non-German peoples, and the Prussian government, while declaring itself ready to discuss Polish concerns, ordered the Prussian military to crush the freedom movement of Polish activists and peasants. Afterwards, the Prussian government retreated from its earlier declarations of autonomy and renamed the Grand Duchy the "Province of Posen".

=== German Empire ===
The German Empire was founded in 1871 with Prussia as the dominant state. The advent of the anti-Catholic Kulturkampf marked the beginning of a period when the Prussian government again attempted to Germanise Poles through language, schooling and religious restrictions. Later, the increase in the number of Poles led the government to a direct anti-Polish demographic policy. In the Province of Posen, the population was nearly 60% Polish and in West Prussia about one-third. By 1885, Prussia still faced difficulties digesting her "Polish provinces", and the "Polish question" was one of the Empire's most pressing problems. Bismarck viewed Poles as one of the chief threats to German power; he declared that "the Polish question is to us a question of life and death" and wanted Polish nation to disappear. In private he went so as far as to express his wish to exterminate the Poles. As a result, the Polish population faced economic, religious and political discrimination as the Germanisation of their territories was promoted. Historian Martin Kitchen called the region a virtual apartheid state in his description of the ethnic segregation in the region.

In the late 19th century, an east-to-west migration (Ostflucht) took place, during which residents of the impoverished eastern provinces migrated to western, more prosperous parts of the German Empire. Through 1907, some 2,300,000 people (both Poles and Germans) emigrated from Prussia's eastern provinces (Pomerania, West Prussia, East Prussia, Posen, and Silesia). The German government was concerned that the Ostflucht would lower the percentage of Germans in the eastern regions and used the event as a justification to the international community for actions aiming at Germanising the provinces.

In 1885, the year before the law creating the Settlement Commission was signed, Prussia expelled 26,000 Polish seasonal workers and other Poles without German citizenship from the Province of Posen.

== The commission and its goals ==
The "Law Concerning the Promotion of German Settlements in the Provinces of West Prussia and Posen" (Gesetz betreffend die Beförderung deutscher Ansiedlungen in den Provinzen Westpreußen und Posen) was passed by both houses of the Prussian parliament and signed by Emperor Wilhelm I on 26 April 1886. In the lower house (Landtag), the law had the support of both conservatives and the National Liberals. The law stated that:

A sum of 100 million marks shall be made available to the State Government to strengthen the German element in the provinces of West Prussia and Posen and to counter Polonisation efforts through the settlement of German farmers and workers:

1. to purchase the land,
2. to the extent necessary, to cover those costs arising
  - from the initial establishment,
  - from the initial maintenance of municipalities, churches, and schools.

... The implementation of this law is entrusted to … a special commission that reports to the State Ministry.

The goals of the Commission were to weaken Polish landowners financially and to Germanise both Polish cities and rural areas. The fights against Polish landownership and the Polish clergy (the Kulturkampf) were intended to achieve the elimination of a Polish national identity. Bismarck regarded aristocratic Polish landowners as the principal agitators for Polish nationalism. Purchasing their estates and parcelling them out to Germans in family-sized farms was intended to both disestablish the group and significantly increase the numbers of Germans in the region.

The focus on land ownership was motivated by German racism and the "völkisch" idea that "where the German plow will plow, there German fatherland will arise". The plan was to isolate Polish settlements in German-inhabited areas by surrounding them with German settlements and spread German ones into Polish dominated areas to isolate specified Polish villages from the rest. The German settlements were to be concentrated to provide a "barrier" to Polishness. Although the commission bought mostly German land, that fact did not interfere with the goal of increasing the German presence, and buying a large tract of land from a single German owner to distribute among many German colonists was perceived as beneficial to the goal. Of the colonists, 96.9% were Protestants, since the Prussian authorities believed that "the true German is a Protestant".

The practice of resettlement was new and unheard-of in Europe. Besides the rationale of the Ostflucht, the German government justified its actions to the international community by labelling Poles as internal enemies of the state, although the attempts did not achieve much success.

== Funding ==
The Commission's funding for rural settlement was 550 million marks:

- 1886 100 million marks
- 1898 100 million marks
- 1902 150 million marks
- 1908 125 million marks
- 1913 75 million marks

An additional 150 million marks was spent to expand state-owned estates and forest lands and 255 million marks for conversions to tenant farms and for promoting the settlement of workers in rural areas. Those expenditures brought the total to 955 million marks.

== Acquisitions, settlement and land purchases ==
From 26 April 1886 to 1 January 1901, the Settlement Commission purchased 147,475 hectares (3.64% of the Province of Posen and 1.65% of West Prussia), and settled 4,277 families (about 30,000 persons); of those, 2,715 families were not native to the two provinces.

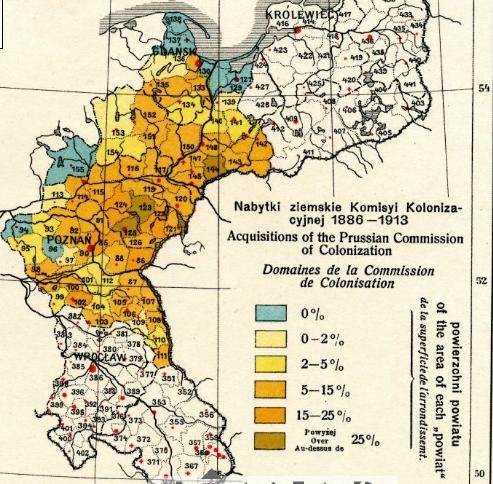
Acquisitions by the Prussian Settlement Commission

By 1913, the Settlement Commission had bought about 5.4% of the land in West Prussia and 10.4% in Posen. 450 new villages had been founded and a total of 438,560 hectares purchased, of which 124,903 were from Poles. In 1914, Germans owned 59% of the land in the Province of Posen, while making up about 40% of population in 1890.

Throughout its 32-year life, the commission was able to buy 8% of the total land in Posen and West Prussia. Of the planned 40,000 families to be settled in Posen and West Prussia, 21,866 had been brought in by 1914, bringing the number of German colonists to 154,000. 5,400 families were German arrivals taken from other parts of partitioned Poland, Congress Poland (a province of the Russian Empire) and Galicia (an Austrian province).

Overall, the commission bought 828 estates (430,450 hectares) for 443 million marks, 214 of those (115,525 hectares) from Poles for 96.4 million marks, and the other 614 (314,926 hectares) from Germans for 346.7 million marks. The commission also bought 631 peasant farms (30,434 hectares) for 44.5 million marks, 274 of those (11,152 hectares) from Poles for 16.6 million marks and the other 357 (19,282 hectares) from Germans for 27.9 million marks. Of the total of 955 million marks spent, about half was spent for land purchases while the rest was spent for administration, parcellation, infrastructure, etc.

The work of the commission was hampered by the fact that few Germans wanted to move to the region, which was seen as underdeveloped and hostile to Germans. In addition, the law and the Polish response to it significantly increased land prices. Many heavily indebted Junker landowners used the threat of selling their land to Poles to force the Settlement Commission to buy their land at inflated prices.

The economic attempt to Germanise the areas failed, and with the beginning of World War I, German authorities and leading members of the commission started to look for new ways to secure a German foothold on Polish territory.

== Origin of the settlers ==
To further Germanise the region, military units that were predominantly German were sent in and later included in the region's population figures. Germans from West Prussia and the Greater Poland region who took part in the settlement process declined over time, while the number of Germans from the Russian Empire increased. In the first years (1886–90), locals from Greater Poland and West Prussia constituted 48% of the settlers, while the proportion of Germans from Russia was below 1%, but in the years 1902–1906, locals made up 17% and Germans from Russia 29% of the settlers.

Of those settled until the end of 1906, a quarter originated in Posen and West Prussia, another quarter in the neighbouring provinces of East Prussia, Pomerania, Brandenburg, Saxony and Silesia, 30% from other parts of the German Empire and 20% from outside the empire, especially Russia.

== Impact on ethnic composition ==
One of the chief aims of the commission was to stop the increase in the Polish population in Germanised territories of Greater Poland, which was recovering after the fall following the initial Prussian takeover. While the commission never fully realised its goals, it managed to weaken Polish influence. In Greater Poland, the Polish share of the population did not reach its pre-1815 levels.

Ethnic composition of Greater Poland
Year	1815	1861	1890	1910
Total population	776,000	1,467,604	1,751,642	2,099,831
% Poles (including bilinguals)	73%	54.6%	60.1%	61.5%
% Germans	25%	43.4%	39.9%	38.5%

Ethnic composition of West Prussia
Year	1858	1890	1905	1910
Total population	–	1,433,681	1,641,936	–
% Poles (including Kashubians)	30.9%	33.8%	34.4%	~35%
% Germans * ^{including bilinguals}	69.1%	66.2%*	65.6%*	~65%

In addition to 154,000 colonists, Germany also assigned 378,000 German military personnel and officials in Polish territories.

== Legislation ==
Since the economic approach was not providing the hoped-for results, additional laws were enacted to promote the Settlement Commission's aims.

- 1896: Land acquired from the commission could be sold freely only to the settler's next of kin. The commission's approval was required for any other sale.
- 1904: The Prussian government restricted Poles from acquiring land if it would interfere with the goals of the commission. Any new settlement required a building permit, even if it were only for renovation of an existing building to make it habitable. Local officials routinely denied the permits to Poles. The law faced international criticism and opposition from liberal groups concerned about private property rights. The Prussian Administrative High Court overturned the legislation.
- 1908: The Prussian parliament passed a law permitting the forcible expropriation of Polish landowners by the Settlement Commission. In 1912, four large Polish estates of 1,656 hectares were expropriated. The law faced criticism from the international community and German liberals concerned about stripping fundamental rights from a segment of German citizens. According to historian Andrzej Chwalba, more than one newspaper in Europe wrote that Prussia was becoming a police state. In part due to protests, the law's execution was delayed until 1914.
- 1913: To prevent Poles from redistributing their land to other Poles, a law was passed that forbade the dividing of private land without the agreement of the state.

Other measures in support of the Germanisation policy included:

- Ethnic Germans were favoured in government contracts.
- Ethnic Germans were promoted in investment plans and supply contracts.
- German craftsmen in Polish territories received the best locations in cities from the authorities so that they could start their own business and prosper.
- Soldiers received orders that banned them from buying from Poles under the threat of arrest.
- German merchants were encouraged to settle in Polish territories.
- Tax incentives and beneficial financial arrangements were offered to German officials and clerks if they would settle in provinces with large Polish populations.

== Polish countermeasures ==
The creation of the commission stimulated Poles to take countermeasures that gradually turned into a competition of Poles against the German state, with Poles running their own settlement banks and settlement societies, resulting in a "battle for soil". In 1888 Teodor Kalkstein founded Bank Ziemski, supported by Poles from Austria's Galicia region. 1894 saw Polish intellectuals in cooperation with Polish farmers founding the Association of Independent Farmers (Spólka Rolników Indywidualnych). Ignacy Sikorski founded the Land Division Bank (Bank Parcelacyjny) in 1896. From 1890 until 1912, Polish enterprises, banks and associations grew in number and strength, providing Poles with a defence against the Germanisation of their land. The efforts to Germanise the region in fact strengthened the Polish nationalist movement. Among the Poles in Pomerania, Masuria and Silesia, Polish nationalism, Catholicism and cultural resistance solidified. For the Settlement Commission, the countermeasures led to a decrease in the availability of purchasable Polish-owned land. In 1895 and all the years following 1898, the vast majority of estates were purchased from Germans instead of Poles, and beginning in 1902, the commission was able to acquire land from Poles "only rarely and only through a middleman". By 1904, Polish efforts had succeeded in establishing 35,536 farms on 150,000 hectares; the corresponding German figures were 24,969 farms and 124,000 hectares. Prussia responded with the 1904 law (see above) that restricted Polish land acquisition.

Numerous initiatives proved to be more elastic and efficient than the large centralised German bureaucracy. A social understanding arose among the Polish population that led to abandoning class differences in order to defend national existence. The rich helped the poor to perform better economically and were supported by the clergy in their actions. Rich nobility often sold their artistic legacies to invest in banking and financial enterprises, or to buy more land for Poles. This was viewed as moral and ethical behaviour among the Polish population. Some Polish nationalists distributed a leaflet in 1912 that included antisemitic statements, warning that "any Pole who buys from Jews and Germans undermines the existence of the Catholic Church and the Fatherland". Local newspapers attempted to intimidate residents who purchased goods from German and Jewish merchants by publishing their names in the paper and accusing them of "betray[ing]...their country".

As a result, the German initiative created the very thing it tried to eliminate in the first place: a Polish national awakening in the Greater Poland region (the Province of Posen) and a feeling of Polish national unity. Faced with the inability to Germanise the Polish provinces by economic means, German leaders and thinkers began to consider pursuing extraordinary means. Catherine Epstein said that Polish resistance to German methods strengthened Polish nationalism and noted the similarity of commission actions to those of the Nazis.

== First World War ==
Even before the First World War, some Germans, including Hans Delbrück and Chancellor Bernhard von Bülow, proposed expelling Poles from the eastern territories of Germany. With the coming of the war, those ideas began to take real and determined form in the shape of plans to be realised after German victory and, as a consequence, hegemony in Central and Eastern Europe. The idea of extraordinary measures was the result of the failed economic attempt to Germanise Polish provinces. Heads of the Settlement Commission were among the architects and supporters of the plans. The president of the Settlement Commission, Gense, was one of the chief supporters and planners of the "Polish border strip", which envisioned expelling about 2 million non-Germans (chiefly Poles and Jews) from 30,000 square kilometres of the would-be annexed territories of Congress Poland, which would then become Germanised. The Poles remaining in Germany who refused to become Germanised were to be "encouraged" to move to a planned German-run Polish puppet state established from the remains of Congress Poland.

Other notable names of Settlement Commission activists include Friedrich von Schwerin and industrialist Alfred Hugenberg, who worked for and represented the Krupp family.

== Outcome ==
The Settlement Commission's goal to Germanise Polish territories failed, and with the fall of German Empire in 1918 at the end of World War I, the commission ceased to function. In 1919 its headquarters were taken over by the Polish state as well as most of its territory. 3.9% (18,200 hectares) of the land purchased remained in the hands of Germans within the new borders of Germany. The Germanisation policies resulted in strong measures against the German settlers by the Polish state after World War I. The Polish state refused to recognize the ownership rights of most of the German settlers, about half of whom fled or were driven out of Poland. The actions of the Polish state were condemned by the Permanent Court of International Justice, ruling in 1923 "that the position adopted by the Polish Government [...] was not in conformity with its international obligations". By 1918, the total ethnic Polish population was greater than when the commission began operations. Between 1918 and 1939, the German population in the areas declined by another 70%, and the land owned by Germans by 45%.

The Settlement Commission was formally dissolved on 1 April 1924.

== Influence on Nazism ==
Prussian policies of settlement and forced assimilation were an influence on German Nazi thinkers during their war in the East. Their plans were a rebirth of the idea, only this time rather than simply colonise the land purchased by the Prussian Settlement Commission, Poles would be ethnically cleansed and exterminated, and German colonists would occupy their place. The Nazis also planned to form a Reich Settlement Commission, based on Prussian Settlement Commission, to coordinate all internal colonization within German Reich. The plan was laid out by Nazi official Curt von Gottberg, who presented it to Heinrich Himmler and as reward was appointed as Land Registry Chief in Prague in June 1939.

Some of the former colonists were active in a Nazi campaign of genocide against Poles during World War II.

== See also ==
- Anti-Polish sentiment
- German Eastern Marches Society
- Drzymała's wagon
